= Nobiling assassination attempt =

1878 attack on Wilhelm I in Berlin, Germany

- Part of propaganda of the deed
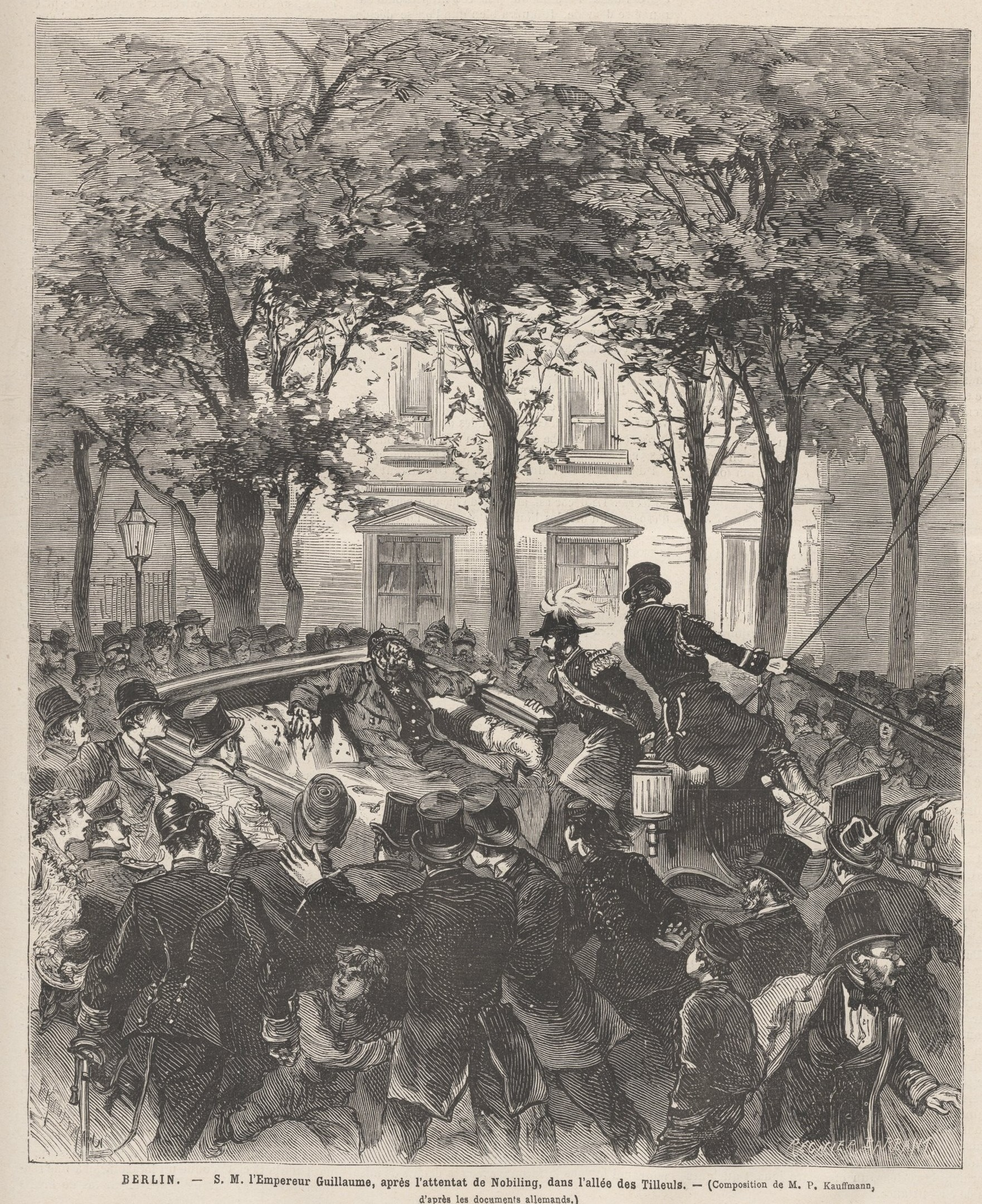
- Nobiling assassination attempt on the front cover of Le Monde illustré (8 June 1878)
- Location: 52°31′2.30840″N 13°23′21.22638″E; 18 Unter den Linden, Berlin, Germany
- Date: 2 June 1878
- Target: Wilhelm I
- Attack type: Shooting
- Weapon: Double-barreled shotgun
- Deaths: 1 (driver of a police car hitting his own head)
- Injuries: 3
- Perpetrators: Karl Nobiling; Emil Werner (?); Anti-authoritarian International (?)
- Motive: Anarchism

The Nobiling assassination attempt, or the assassination attempt on Wilhelm I of 2 June 1878, was an armed attack carried out by Karl Nobiling, a German anarchist philosopher, against the Kaiser Wilhelm I, severely wounding him. Along with the Hödel assassination attempt, less than a month earlier and aimed at the same target, it was one of the first acts of propaganda by the deed in history.

The anarchist movement, founded shortly before, faced significant repression in Western Europe. This pushed anarchists to develop new strategies, such as propaganda by the deed, aiming to transmit their ideas through actions rather than through writings or speeches. In parallel with these developments, Karl Nobiling, a doctor of philosophy, drew closer to the labour movement and gradually joined the anarchists.

In early 1878, Nobiling undertook an international journey, traveling to Paris, London, Strasbourg, and other European cities. Upon returning to Berlin, he moved into an apartment on the Unter den Linden avenue, where the Kaiser frequently passed by carriage. On 11 May 1878, Max Hödel, a young German anarchist with whom Nobiling was likely in contact, attempted to assassinate the Kaiser on this same avenue but missed. Twenty-two days later, as the Kaiser passed in front of his home, Nobiling fired upon him from his window with a double-barreled shotgun. He struck the Kaiser's face and arm, causing serious injury. He then shot a person attempting to stop him upon entering his apartment before placing his revolver to his own temple and pulling the trigger. Nobiling survived his self-inflicted wound for three months before dying in prison. Meanwhile, Wilhelm I received medical treatment and underwent a period of convalescence before returning to public life.

A wave of repression swept through Germany following the attack, leading to the conviction of many individuals for simple statements regarding the Kaiser. German Chancellor Otto von Bismarck used the attack as a pretext to dissolve the Reichstag and call for new elections to pass the Anti-Socialist Laws, targeting the Social Democratic Party. This focus by German authorities on the Social Democrats may explain why, according to some historians, the investigation following the attack was never fully pursued, despite several elements suggesting the involvement of the Anti-authoritarian International, the primary anarchist organization of the period.

== History ==
=== General context ===
The anarchist movement, founded around the Saint-Imier Congress in Switzerland in 1872, began to spread across Europe. The situation was complicated and repressive for the movement, with measures such as the Dufaure Law of 1872 in France, which banned the Anti-authoritarian International, the primary anarchist organization of that period. In this repressive context, anarchists progressively came to theorize and support the strategy of propaganda by the deed, which suggested acting directly to carry out an act of propaganda rather than waiting for speeches or writings to do so. This materialized through acts of insurrectionary revolt or assassinations targeting political or financial figures.

In parallel, several anarchists in contact with the first generation sought to establish the movement within the German Empire. Some of the most notable were August Reinsdorf and Emil Werner, who maintained anarchist publications in German while in Switzerland and began to establish a presence on German territory. Reinsdorf himself was a strong supporter of propaganda by the deed.

=== Karl Nobiling: an anarchist historian and philosopher ===
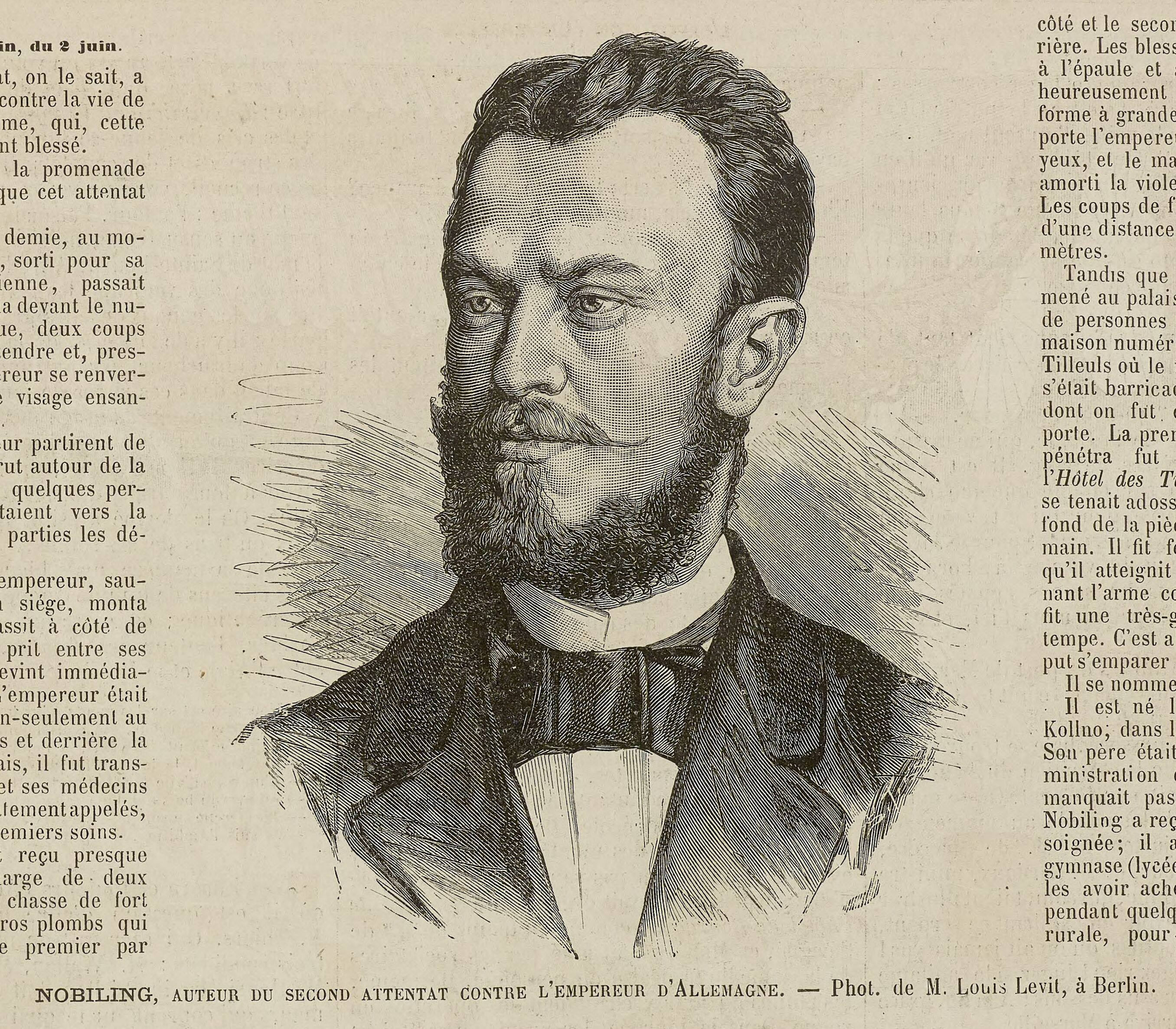
Karl Nobiling in L'Illustration

Karl Eduard Nobiling, born in 1848 and thus 30 years old at the time of the attack, came from a wealthy Protestant family. His father was a deceased major in the Prussian army, and his mother subsequently remarried another military officer. Two of his brothers also studied and became officers in the same army, while his sister was a Protestant nun.

Nobiling initially studied under various private tutors, such as Friedrich Liebe, whom he personally thanked for his intellectual development in his thesis. He then attended school before undertaking both agricultural work and a doctoral thesis at the University of Leipzig. The young man alternated between these two occupations, spending long periods working and others returning to his thesis, titled: 'Contributions to the History of Agriculture in the Saale District', which he successfully presented in 1876.

During his studies, he began to move closer to the labour movement and adopt increasingly anarchist positions. He thus opposed the Kaiser and desired the abolition of the State. Nobiling also attended various socialist meetings. He moved to Berlin in October 1877. The anarchist managed to support himself by writing for scientific and agricultural journals.

=== Premises of the attack and Hödel's attack ===
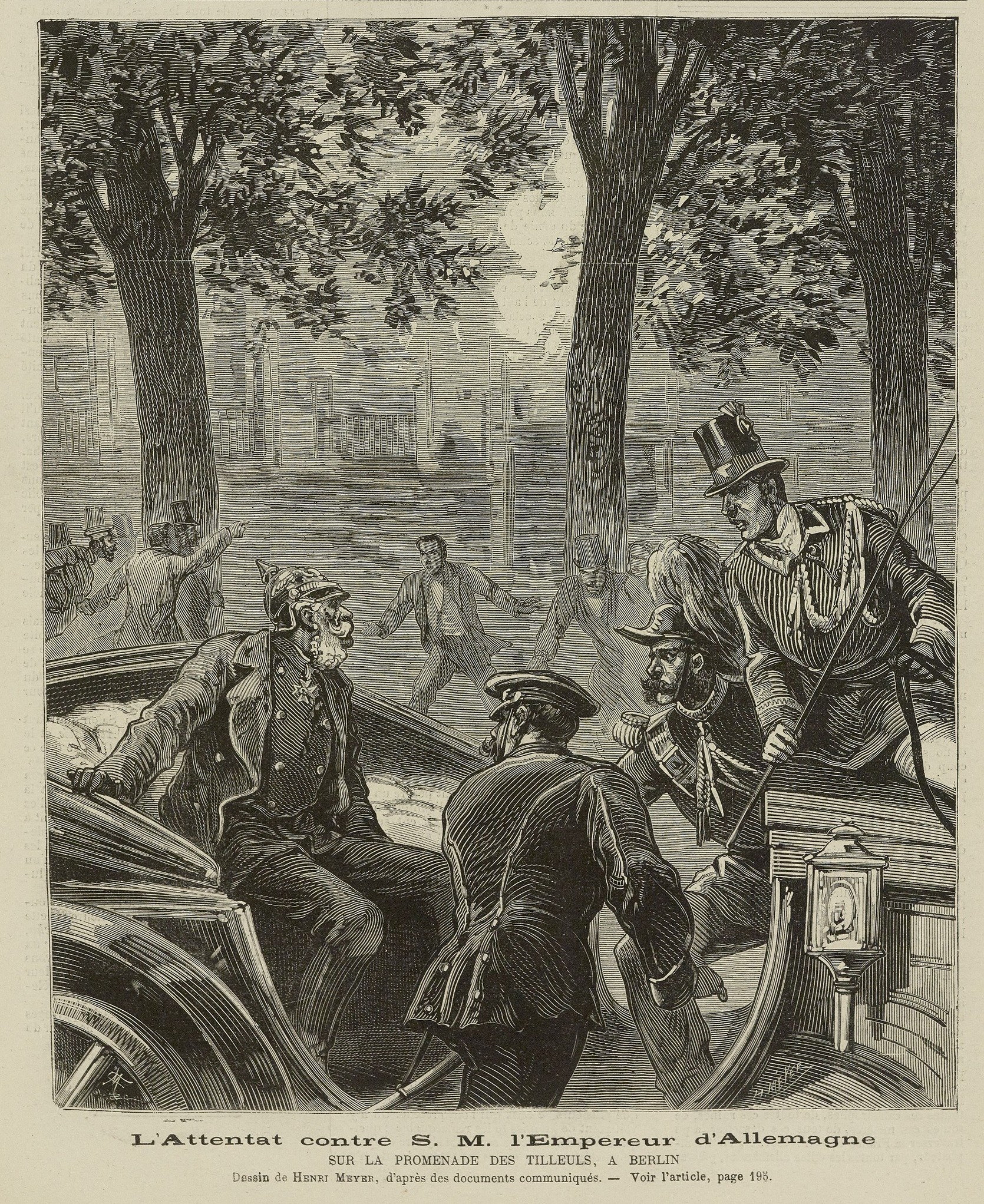
Nobiling's attack on the front cover of Le Journal illustré (16 June 1878)

In January 1878, Nobiling undertook a journey that took him to Leipzig, Strasbourg, Paris, Switzerland, and eventually London. Upon his return, he changed residences and moved to 18 Unter den Linden, an avenue where Kaiser William I frequently passed. On 11 May of the same year, Max Hödel, a young German anarchist with whom Nobiling was likely in contact before his own attack, stationed himself on Unter den Linden and fired at the Kaiser, missing him three times; this is known as the Hödel assassination attempt.

Following the Hödel assassination attempt (who was arrested after being beaten), European police forces, particularly the French and British, became aware that a decisive event was expected to take place in Berlin on 2 June. They warned the German police, who took no account of the information. In parallel, several witnesses noted that Nobiling was making inflammatory statements about the Kaiser; for instance, he told a young girl that the Emperor's days were numbered until a better shot than Hödel took it upon himself to gun him down. He also reportedly destroyed all his letters during this period, and although he was known to have an extensive correspondence, the police found no letters when his home was raided. He also asked a photographer to make copies of his portrait, just as Hödel had done.

Living at 18 Unter den Linden, just a few meters from where the Hödel attack had occurred, his task was made easier by the fact that the Kaiser decided to keep the same route, believing that Hödel's action was that of a misguided and isolated young man.

=== The Nobiling assassination attempt ===
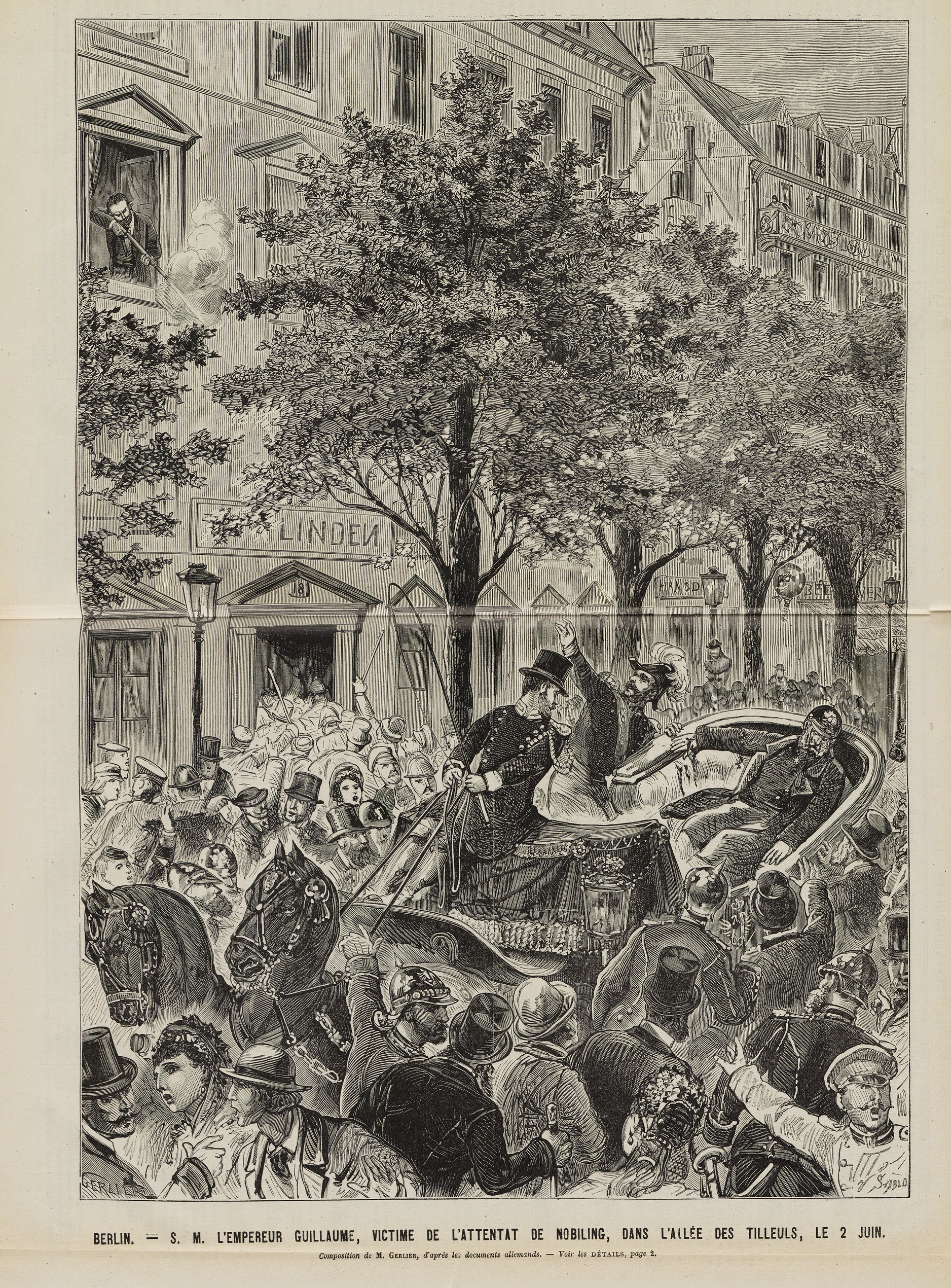
Nobiling's attack in La Presse Illustrée (16 June 1878)

On 2 June 1878, the date indicated by the French and British police, the Kaiser was returning from his usual promenade, just as he had during the previous attempt. Nobiling had curtly dismissed his landlady, who had passed through the hallway earlier that day, before going to lunch and returning to take his position in his apartment.

There, the anarchist was armed with several firearms, including a double-barreled shotgun. Around 2:30 in the afternoon, the Kaiser's carriage came into the assailant's view. Nobiling took aim, tracking his target until the carriage passed directly in front of his apartment. At that moment, Nobiling opened fire on the monarch: the first shot caused his target to stand up and instinctively place a hand in front of his face to shield himself; the second shot struck him in the face and arm, throwing him back into the carriage, where he collapsed, heavily wounded.

Meanwhile, several people rushed into the building to seize Nobiling. One of the first was a man named Holtfeuer, who entered first and attempted to throw himself at the anarchist. Nobiling shot him in the face with his revolver, seriously wounding him. This sent Holtfeuer falling backward down the stairs, where he was then beaten by others who had mistakenly taken him for the shooter.

Having a few moments left, Nobiling placed his revolver against his right temple and fired. He missed his mark; the bullet instead passed through his head below the right eye rather than truly hitting the temple. He was arrested shortly after in critical condition. While being transported to prison, the driver of the police vehicle struck his head on the archway of the courtyard at 18 Unter den Linden and later died from his injuries.

As for the Emperor, he was severely injured: he received over 30 projectile fragments in his body, including 5 in the head, 7 in the right forearm and wrist, 20 in his left arm and shoulder, and 6 in the neck. The fact that he was wearing his Prussian helmet likely saved his life; otherwise, his face and head would have been more heavily impacted. Nevertheless, he recovered from his wounds quickly.

Nobiling died from the consequences of his injuries in prison three months later.

=== Investigation and repression of socialism in Germany ===
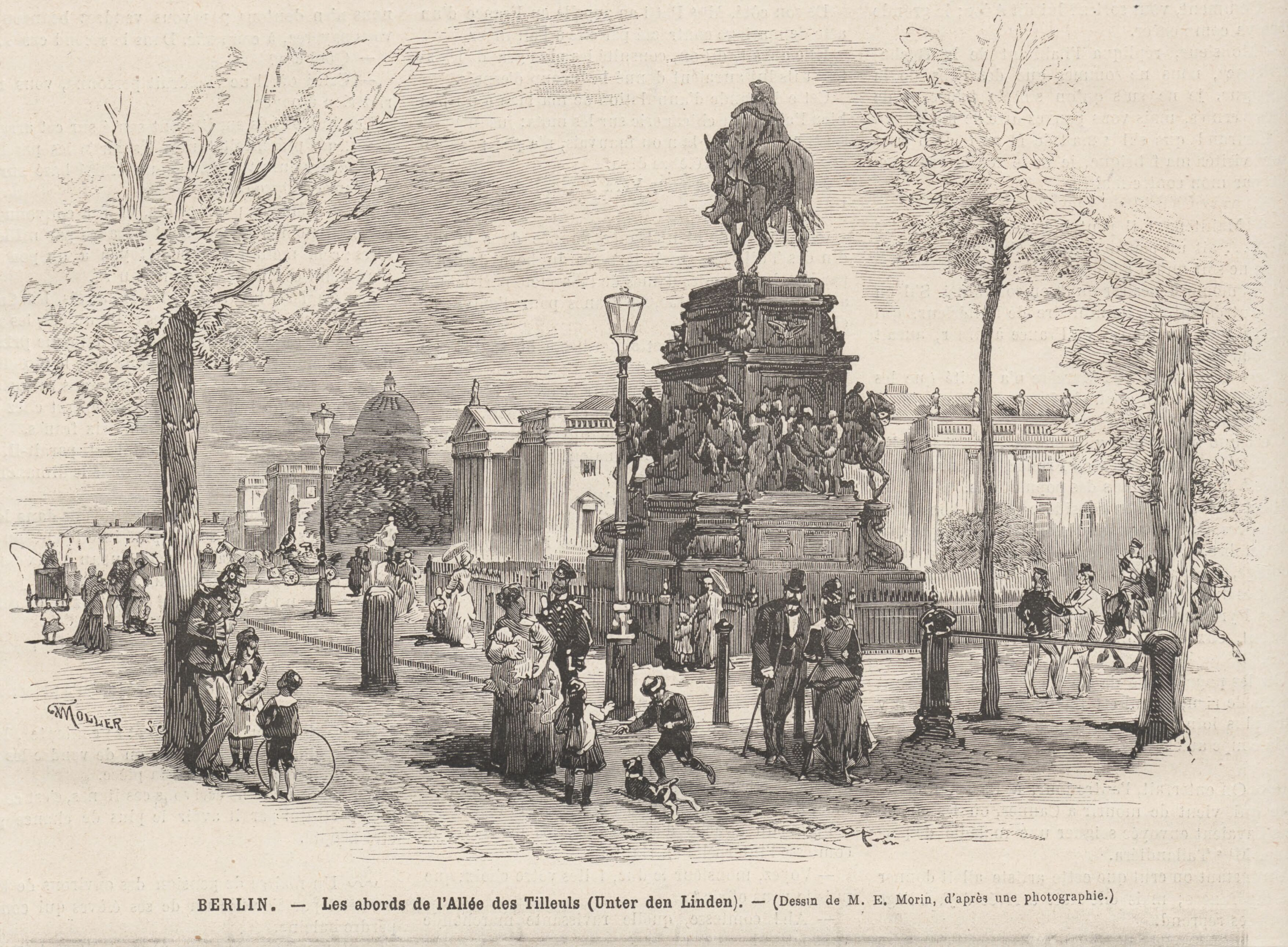
Unter den Linden after Nobiling's attack in Le Monde illustré

Immediately following the attack, a wave of repression descended upon socialists in Germany. Between June and August 1878, 563 individuals were put on trial for lèse-majesté: only 42 were acquitted, and 5 committed suicide during the proceedings. The charges against the accused were often poorly substantiated or entirely disproportionate. For instance, a man who stated, 'Hodel is a dumbbell, but Nobiling planned his attempt well', was sentenced to four years in prison.

In general, the German police conducted a poor investigation. They sought to uncover an international conspiracy centered around the foreign locations Nobiling had visited (Paris, London, Strasbourg, etc.) and, in doing so, undervalued the national connections of the plot. Historian Andrew Carlson believes it is likely that the attacks by Nobiling and Hödel were linked and planned in Leipzig by Emil Werner and fellow conspirators, all of whom belonged to the German section of the Jura Federation, a central body of the Anti-Authoritarian International.

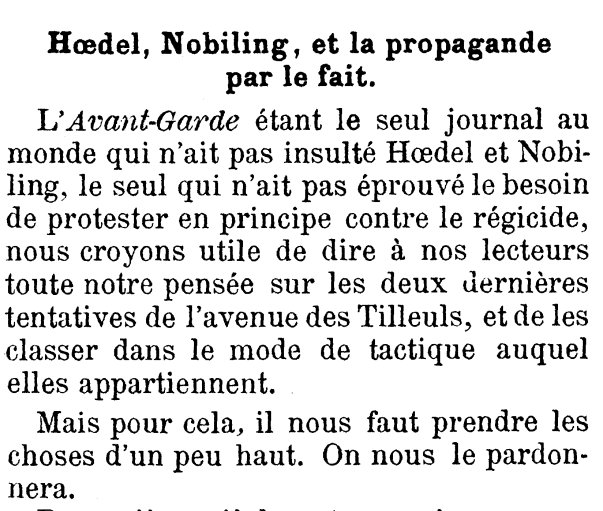
First lines of Hödel, Nobiling and propaganda of the deed in L'Avant-Garde, the press organ of the Jura Federation

Several elements support this theory, according to the historian, including a seized letter from Werner in which he appears to be behind the attempt. Furthermore, when police raided Nobiling's home, authorities found twelve different beer glasses on the table, suggesting that the anarchist had hosted a group the night before the attack and that those attending, who were never found, were aware of the plan. It is probable that Nobiling and Hödel knew each other well and associated before their attacks, as evidenced by several testimonies (some exaggerated, others more plausible). In Switzerland, anarchists of the Jura Federation, such as Paul Brousse, published an article in L'Avant-Garde titled 'Hödel, Nobiling, and Propaganda of the Deed', in which the attempts were celebrated and implicitly claimed by the Federation. James Guillaume, a central member of this Federation, reportedly stated shortly after the attack that 'Nobiling was one of ours'.

If the German police went astray in their investigation, Carlson argues it was not necessarily due to incompetence alone, but because national political motives influenced both cases. Indeed, Chancellor Otto von Bismarck, who acted as regent while Wilhelm I was wounded, sought to use Nobiling's attack, just as he had unsuccessfully tried with Hödel's shortly before, to pass his Anti-Socialist Laws, targeting the Social Democratic Party of Germany.

Following this second attempt, he was able to dissolve the Reichstag and pass his repressive laws once he obtained a majority in parliament. Nevertheless, he remained dissatisfied, as amendments to the laws hindered his room for maneuver and prevented him from completely banning the party. Within this context, where political power sought to criminalize a party to which Hödel and Nobiling may have been loosely affiliated, but which was neither the Jura Federation nor the Anti-Authoritarian International, the fact that the investigation did not follow those leads can also be explained by these political goals rather than simple police error.

== Bibliography ==
- Baker, Zoe (2023), Means and Ends: The Revolutionary Practice of Anarchism in Europe and the United States, Edinburgh: AK Press, ISBN 978-1-84935-498-1
- Carlson, Andrew (1972), Anarchism in Germany, vol. 1, Metuchen, N. J.: The Scarecrow Press, Inc., ISBN 0-8 108-0484-0
- Eisenzweig, Uri (2001). Fictions de l'anarchisme [Fictions of anarchism] (in French). France: C. Bourgois. ISBN 2-267-01570-6.
