= Max Hödel =

German anarchist, failed assassin (1857–1878)

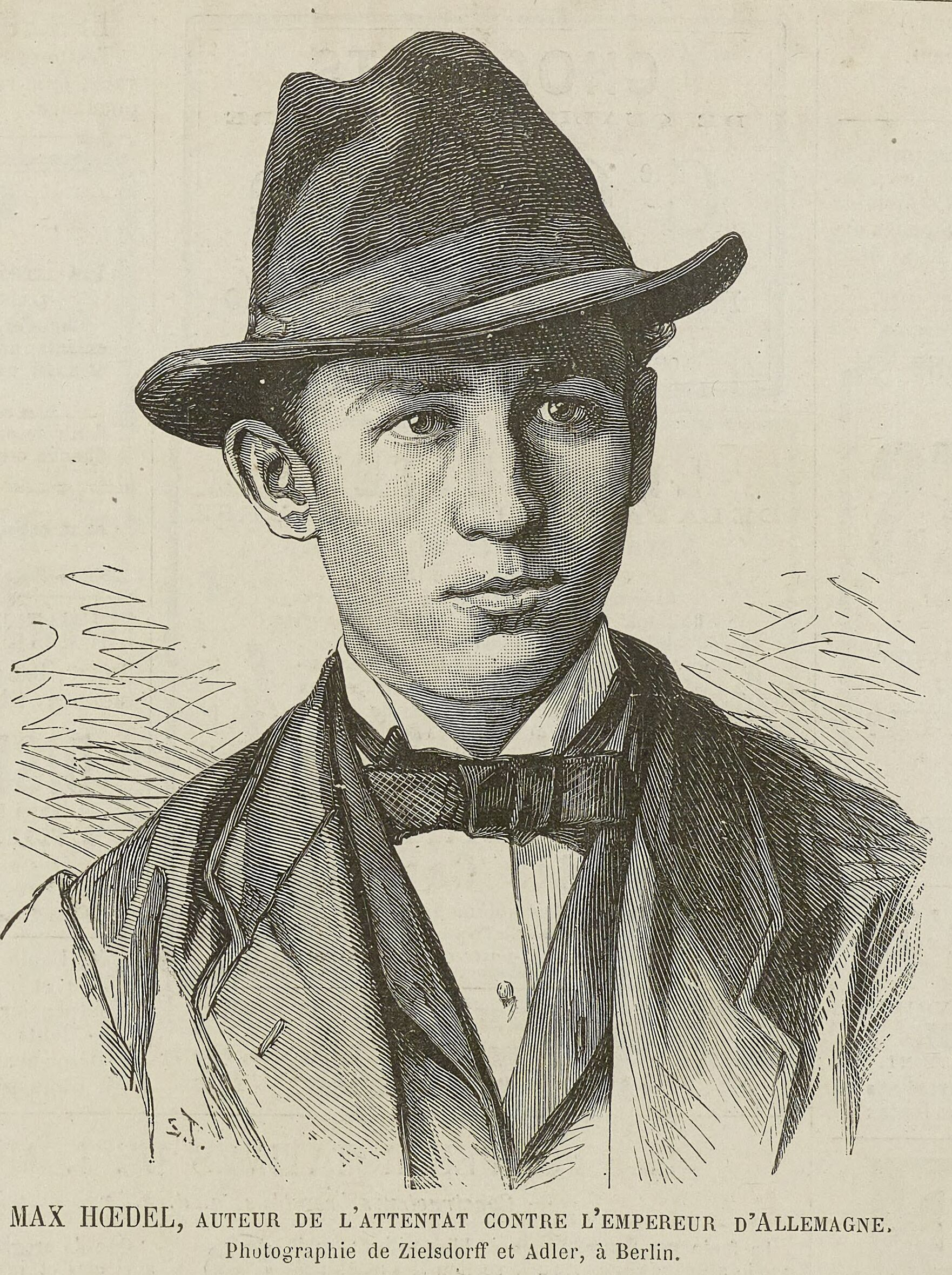
- Portrait of Hödel from L'Illustration, 25 May 1878
- Born: Emil Heinrich Max Hödel; 27 May 1857; Leipzig, Kreishauptmannschaft Leipzig, Kingdom of Saxony
- Died: 16 August 1878 (aged 21); Moabit, Berlin, German Empire
- Cause of death: Execution by beheading
- Occupation: Plumber
- Political party: CSPA
- Other political affiliations: NLP; SAP
- Conviction: High treason
- Penalty: Death

Max Hödel (27 May 1857 – 16 August 1878) was a German tinsmith and anarchist from Leipzig. He is best known for committing the Hödel assassination attempt on Kaiser Wilhelm I, one of the first instances of propaganda by the deed in history.

Fatherless and raised in an environment of extreme poverty, Hödel began working as a tinsmith at the age of fifteen after running away multiple times and being publicly whipped for theft. He scraped by in this position before joining the newly founded Socialist Workers' Party of Germany (SAP), where he became a young cadre. Originally seeking to infiltrate anarchist groups to gather intelligence for his party, he found himself seduced by their ideas and gradually became increasingly aligned with anarchist positions.

On 11 May 1878, Hödel carried out a plan to assassinate Kaiser Wilhelm I. Catching the Emperor during a public appearance, he stepped forward and fired three shots, missing every time. Arrested and violently beaten, Hödel was sentenced to death shortly after his capture, a fate that did not seem to trouble him excessively. After writing a final letter signed 'Long live the Commune!', he was executed.

== Biography ==
=== Birth and youth ===
Hödel, born in 1857 in Leipzig was fatherless. The illegitimate son of a mother who was a very young adult when he was born, he grew up in poverty. Hödel was raised for a time by his grandmother, then an uncle, before being taken back by his mother. At the age of 12, he was imprisoned for a day for fleeing his home; the following year, he ran away again and was placed in the Zeitz reformatory.

He was also publicly whipped as a thief at age 13 and subsequently received a school certificate from his former school labeling him a 'confirmed thief'. Hödel became a tinsmith around the age of 15 and learned the trade quickly. He was dismissed from his apprenticeship after fighting with another tinsmith, sent back to the reformatory, then eventually certified and began practicing as a tinsmith in Leipzig, scraping by while moving between various homes belonging to different family friends.

The young man then began to join the labour movement in his city. He joined the SAP, founded in 1875, and progressively climbed the ranks of the party's internal hierarchy. Bit by bit, he was entrusted with travel missions for the party, participated in numerous internal meetings, and no longer needed to work to support himself. He also sought to serve as a spy for the party, and it may be for this reason that he briefly joined the anarchist group organized by Reinsdorf in Leipzig.

While he began as a socialist, Hödel quickly moved toward anarchist positions following this encounter. During his fourth journey undertaken to conduct propaganda for his party in March 1878, he declared:

We do not need a Kaiser, a King or any laws. Down with all of them, all must go, we want to be free. The state must be abolished and everyone should perform the same amount of labor.

He reportedly also declared that the only way to carry out the revolution in Germany was to 'strike down all sovereigns'. At the same time, he attended anarchist meetings in the company of Emil Werner.

These developments in Hödel's life, along with accusations of embezzling funds, led the SAP to expel him from its ranks upon his return to Leipzig. The anarchist briefly aligned himself with the National Liberals, who paid him to publish a smear piece against his former party, but his affiliation with them ended there.

=== Premises of his attack ===
He set out for Berlin on 24 April 1878. Arriving in the city two days later after unexplained detours to Dresden and Magdeburg, which may have been for the purpose of raising money, he moved into 13 Stallschreiberstraße, renting a room from the widow Breiten.

On 29 April, Hödel joined the conservative Christian Social Workers' Party (CSPA). He began attending party meetings in the following days, distributed their leaflets, and behaved like a devoted CSPA activist, according to his landlady. On 4 May, he went to a merchant named Weblis and bought a revolver for eight marks. Two days later, he went to a photographer and asked to have his picture taken and for as many copies as possible to be made, because within a week, 'his name would be known all over the world and his likeness would be in request wherever men took an interest in current affairs'. This indicates that the plan he was setting in motion was premeditated and that it is conceivable Hödel expected to die during the attack.

=== The Hödel assassination attempt ===
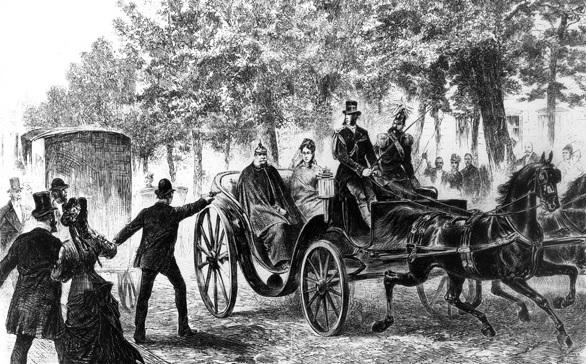
Representation of the Hödel assassination attempt

On Saturday, 11 May 1878, as was often the case, Kaiser Wilhelm I, who had been ruling Germany for seventeen years, was returning from the Tiergarten, where he had just spent part of his afternoon. The Kaiser was traveling up the Unter den Linden avenue in his carriage.

Near number 7, opposite the Russian embassy, Hödel was waiting, his revolver loaded and ready to fire. When the Emperor passed by him, the anarchist tried to throw himself forward, as he was not in the front row. He took aim at his target and began to fire, extending his arm over the shoulder of Mrs. Julius Hauch, a shopkeeper who was at the front of the crowd. Hödel tried to push her, but she did not move, so he extended his arm to fire over her. However, she jostled him at the same moment, annoyed by his attempts to push her, which she attributed to a desire to see the Emperor more closely.

This movement, which jolted Hödel as he fired, deflected his arm as he opened fire, and the first bullet was lost in the air. Dissatisfied with having missed, the anarchist acted quickly: he knocked Mrs. Julius Hauch unconscious with the pommel of his weapon and moved past her, approaching even closer to the Emperor. He then fired a second shot, which he missed, before jumping directly into the street. He fired once at one of his pursuers, then half-crouched to adjust a third and final shot at the Emperor. He missed this third shot as well.

The assailant fled on foot after missing, while Wilhelm I ordered his chasseur to catch and arrest him. Hödel fired twice at his pursuers and fought some of them off but was ultimately apprehended by the crowd and the chasseurs. He was nearly beaten to death but was saved by Carl Reinhold Gustav Kroger, a worker who intervened and rescued him, an act that led to Kroger's arrest for complicity in the attack before he was later cleared during the judicial proceedings.

Once arrested, Hödel declared that:

I am a friend of the Social Democrats, but the anarchists are my men. I have also read Bakunin.

The police found SAP documents and CPSA brochures on him, but nothing that directly affiliated him with the anarchists or anarchism.

=== Trial and sentence to death ===
Hödel, who perhaps thought he would die during the attack, found himself under arrest. He possibly hoped to receive 10 or 20 years in prison instead of the death penalty, though this is uncertain. He chose Otto Freytag as his lawyer, who requested 80 days to review the case documents and prepare a defense, which was denied. His lawyer was therefore court-appointed and showed little interest in defending the accused; he went so far as to apologize to the court for being appointed to the case during his first intervention.

Hödel denied any affiliation with the anarchists and presented himself as a member of the CPSA or a SAP. Most importantly, he was in the middle of judicial proceedings when Karl Nobiling, with whom he was possibly in contact before his own attack, committed the Nobiling assassination attempt, targeting the Kaiser with a similar modus operandi on 2 June 1878.

During his trial, one of the most damaging pieces of evidence provided was a seized letter written from prison to his parents, in which he declared that 'he had sacrificed his life for the public good and his only regret was that his shots had gone astray, but that he hoped that his failure would not damaged the cause'. He spent the entire trial with an ironic and mocking expression on his face. The jury took only 20 minutes to deliberate and sentence him to death, to which he responded with a burst of laughter.

=== Execution ===
In the prison where he was chained to prevent both escape and suicide, Hödel refused to appeal, declaring:

That wouldn't do any good, off with my head.

He requested the right to smoke in his cell, which was granted, and to see his parents, which was refused. On the eve of his execution, he agreed to a last meal and ate two beefsteaks with wine. Hödel raised the first glass and exclaimed 'Long live the Commune!' before eating. The young man wrote several letters, including a final one to his family, in which he wished them the best and also signed off with 'Long live the Commune!'.

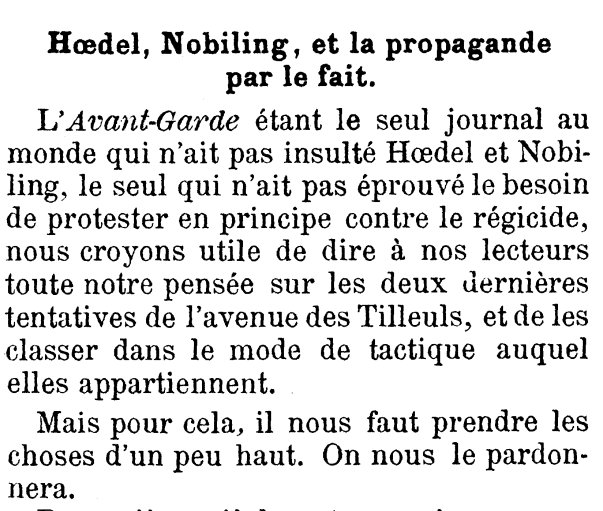
First lines of Hödel, Nobiling and propaganda of the deed in L'Avant-Garde, the press organ of the Jura Federation

Hödel spent the night preceding his execution, from 15 to 16 August 1878, smoking one cigarette after another. The prison guard who came for him at 6 A.M. found him sitting and smoking, after which he followed quickly, drank a glass of milk, and proceeded to the place of execution, which took three minutes from his cell. Upon arriving at the execution site, he rested his head for the first time and asked if this was the spot; then, as the sentence was read again, he cried out 'Bravo!'. Hödel then bared his chest at the request of the authorities and rested his head once more. He was beheaded by the executioner Scharfrichter Krautz in a single stroke.

== Legacy ==
=== Anarchist circles ===
Shortly after his death, his memory was taken up by the Jura Federation, which regarded him as a martyr for the anarchist cause.

== Bibliography ==
- Carlson, Andrew (1972), Anarchism in Germany, vol. 1, Metuchen, N. J.: The Scarecrow Press, Inc., ISBN 0-8 108-0484-0
