= Hödel assassination attempt =

1878 attack on Wilhelm I in Berlin, Germany

- Part of propaganda of the deed
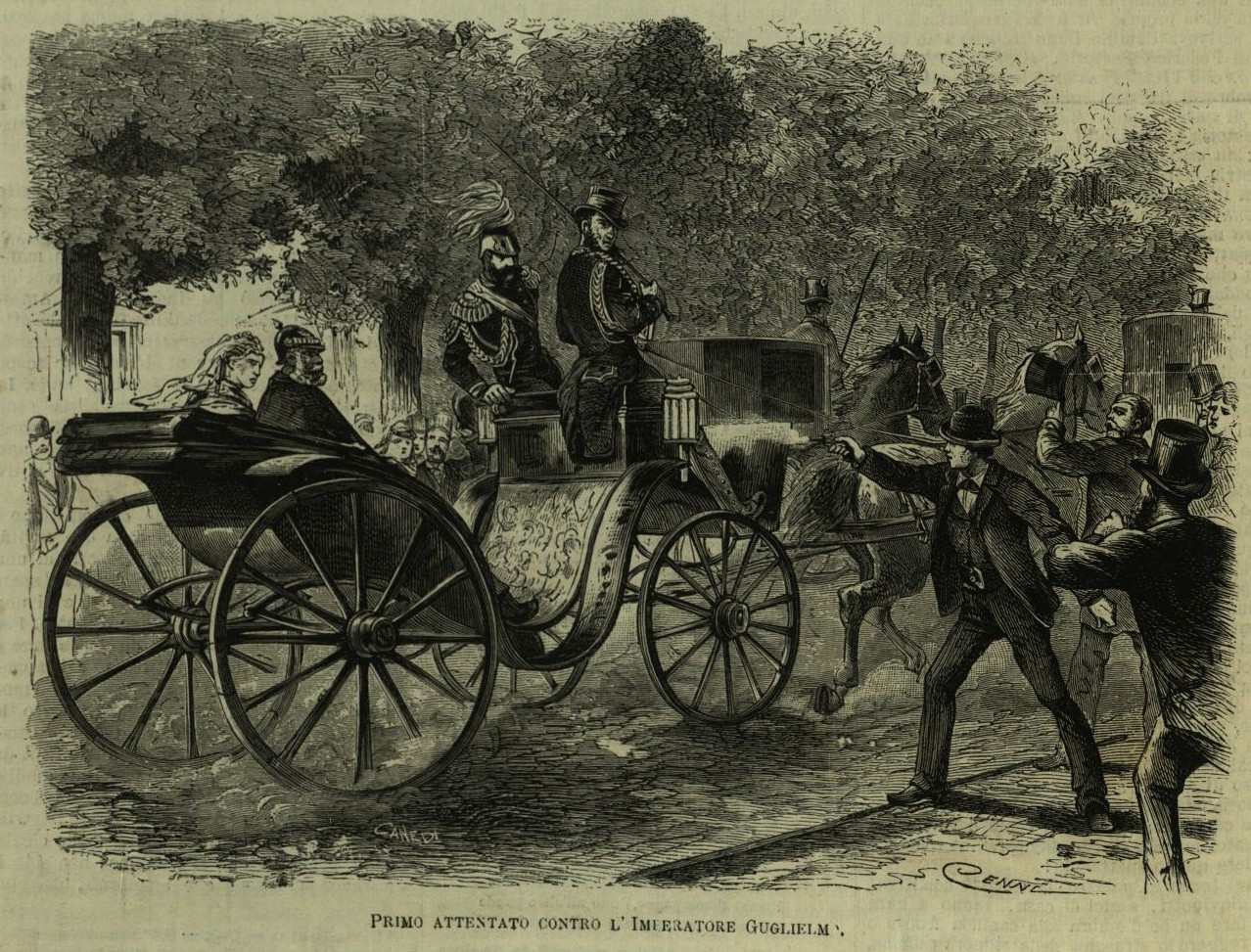
- Hödel assassination attempt in L'Illustrazione Italiana (15 June 1878)
- Location: 52.517294°N 13.394661°E; 7 Unter den Linden, Berlin, Germany
- Date: 11 May 1878
- Target: Wilhelm I
- Attack type: Shooting
- Weapon: Revolver
- Deaths: 0
- Injuries: 0
- Perpetrators: Max Hödel; Karl Nobiling (?); Emil Werner (?); Anti-authoritarian International (?)
- Motive: Anarchism
- Accused: 1
- Verdict: Guilty

The Hödel assassination attempt, or the assassination attempt on Wilhelm I of 11 May 1878, was an armed attack carried out by Max Hödel, a young German anarchist, against the Kaiser, Wilhelm I. Along with the Nobiling assassination attempt, less than a month later and aimed at the same target, it was one of the first acts of propaganda by the deed in history.

The anarchist movement, founded shortly before, faced significant repression in Western Europe. This pushed anarchists to develop new strategies, such as propaganda by the deed, aiming to transmit their ideas through actions rather than through writings or speeches. In parallel with these developments, Max Hödel, a poor young man initially in the Social Democratic Party, came into contact with several anarchists and became increasingly in agreement with their positions.

In April 1878, Hödel moved from Leipzig to Berlin, armed himself, and prepared to carry out his attack. On 11 May, he managed to target the Kaiser during one of his usual public appearances, fired at him three times, and missed, despite the fact that he was apparently a good marksman. Arrested and beaten, he was quickly tried and sentenced to death, without this appearing to bother him excessively. After his death sentence, he refused to appeal, closed his last letter with 'Long live the Commune!' and was then executed.

Hödel's attempt and trajectory lead to historiographical debates. While some historians maintain that it was an attack carried out by an isolated young man with little knowledge of the subtleties of anarchist thought, more recent historians challenge this reading and present, on the contrary, an attempt likely thought out and organized by the Anti-authoritarian International. According to these more recent readings, Hödel was fully anarchist and sought to avoid repression of the anarchist movement by presenting himself differently during the judicial proceedings.

== History ==
=== General context ===
The anarchist movement, founded around the Saint-Imier Congress in Switzerland in 1872, began to spread across Europe. The situation was complicated and repressive for the movement, with measures such as the Dufaure Law of 1872 in France, which banned the Anti-authoritarian International, the primary anarchist organization of that period. In this repressive context, anarchists progressively came to theorize and support the strategy of propaganda by the deed, which suggested acting directly to carry out an act of propaganda rather than waiting for speeches or writings to do so. This materialized through acts of insurrectionary revolt or assassinations targeting political or financial figures.

In parallel, several anarchists in contact with the first generation sought to establish the movement within the German Empire. Some of the most notable were August Reinsdorf and Emil Werner, who maintained anarchist publications in German while in Switzerland and began to establish a presence on German territory. Reinsdorf himself was a strong supporter of propaganda by the deed.

=== Max Hödel: a poor and radical young man ===
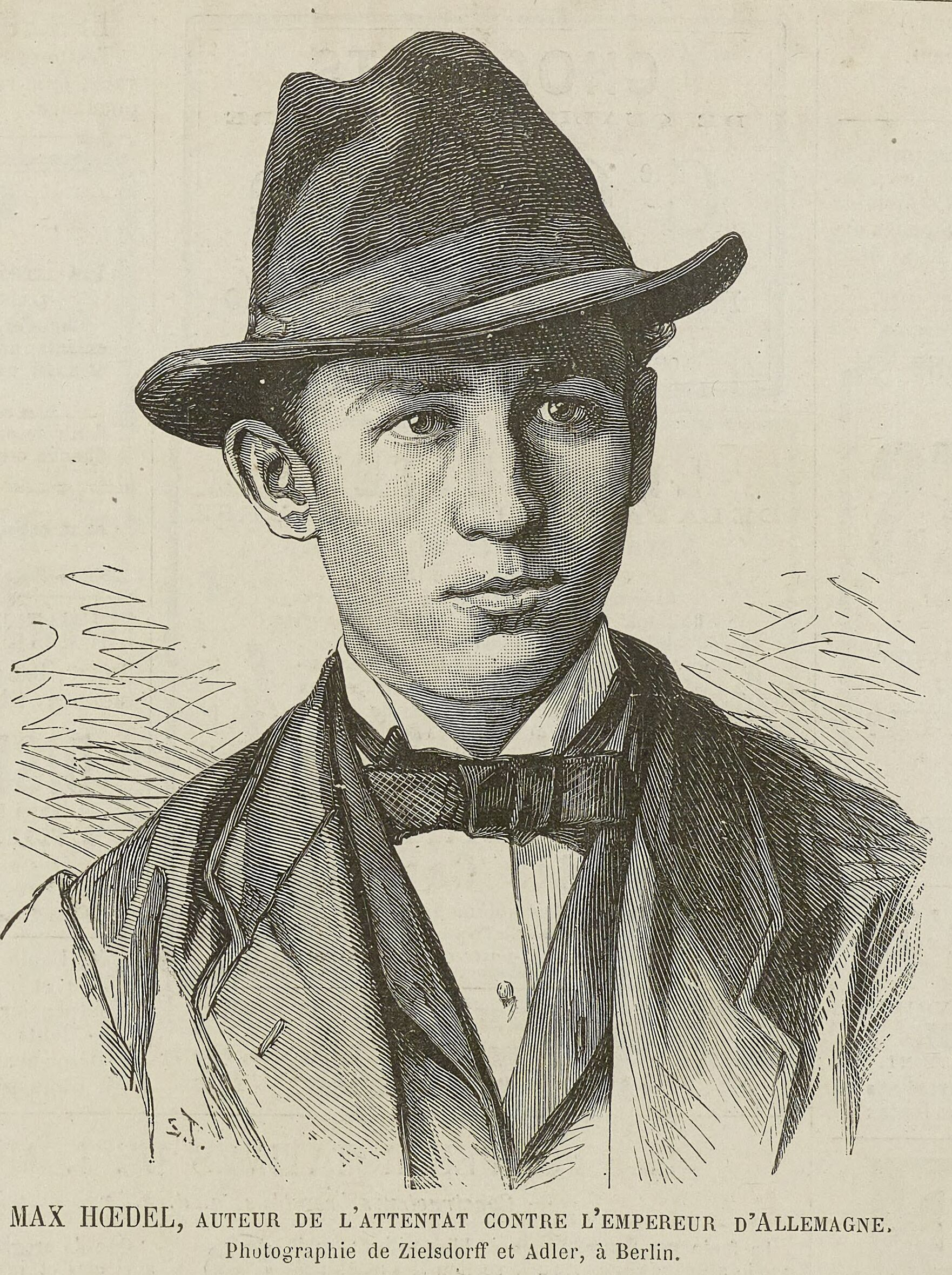
Max Hödel in L'Illustration (25 May 1878)

Max Hödel, born in 1857 in Leipzig and thus 21 years old at the time of the attack, was fatherless. The illegitimate son of a mother who was a very young adult when he was born, he grew up in poverty. Hödel was raised for a time by his grandmother, then an uncle, before being taken back by his mother. At the age of 12, he was imprisoned for a day for fleeing his home; the following year, he ran away again and was placed in the Zeitz reformatory.

He was also publicly whipped as a thief at age 13 and subsequently received a school certificate from his former school labeling him a 'confirmed thief'. Hödel became a tinsmith around the age of 15 and learned the trade quickly. He was dismissed from his apprenticeship after fighting with another tinsmith, sent back to the reformatory, then eventually certified and began practicing as a tinsmith in Leipzig, scraping by while moving between various homes belonging to different family friends.

The young man then began to join the labour movement in his city. He joined the German Social Democratic Party, founded in 1875, and progressively climbed the ranks of the party's internal hierarchy. Bit by bit, he was entrusted with travel missions for the party, participated in numerous internal meetings, and no longer needed to work to support himself. He also sought to serve as a spy for the party, and it may be for this reason that he briefly joined the anarchist group organized by Reinsdorf in Leipzig.

While he began as a socialist, Hödel quickly moved toward anarchist positions following this encounter. During his fourth journey undertaken to conduct propaganda for his party in March 1878, he declared:

We do not need a Kaiser, a King or any laws. Down with all of them, all must go, we want to be free. The state must be abolished and everyone should perform the same amount of labor.

He reportedly also declared that the only way to carry out the revolution in Germany was to 'strike down all sovereigns'. At the same time, he attended anarchist meetings in the company of Emil Werner.

These developments in Hödel's life, along with accusations of embezzling funds, led the Social Democratic Party to expel him from its ranks upon his return to Leipzig. The anarchist briefly aligned himself with the National Liberals, who paid him to publish a smear piece against his former party, but his affiliation with them ended there.

=== Premises of the attack ===
According to Andrew Carlson, it is likely that Hödel devised his plot in Leipzig. He learned how to handle weapons, possibly with Karl Nobiling. Then, he set out for Berlin on 24 April 1878. Arriving in the city two days later after unexplained detours to Dresden and Magdeburg, which may have been for the purpose of raising money, he moved into 13 Stallschreiberstrasse, renting a room from the widow Breiten.

On 29 April, the young man joined the conservative Christian Social Party. He began attending party meetings in the following days, distributed their leaflets, and behaved like a devoted Christian Social activist, according to his landlady. On 4 May, he went to a merchant named Weblis and bought a revolver for eight marks. Two days later, he went to a photographer and asked to have his picture taken and for as many copies as possible to be made, because within a week, 'his name would be known all over the world and his likeness would be in request wherever men took an interest in current affairs'. This indicates that the plan he was setting in motion was premeditated and that it is conceivable Hödel expected to die during the attack.

=== The Hödel assassination attempt ===
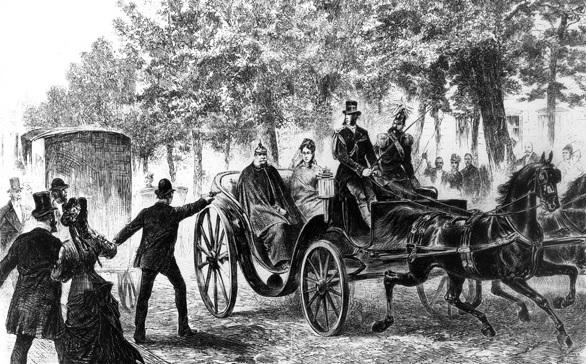
Representation of the attack

On Saturday, 11 May 1878, as was often the case, Kaiser Wilhelm I, who had been ruling Germany for seventeen years, was returning from the Tiergarten, where he had just spent part of his afternoon. The Kaiser was traveling up the Unter den Linden avenue in his carriage.

Near number 7, opposite the Russian embassy, Hödel was waiting, his revolver loaded and ready to fire. When the Emperor passed by him, the anarchist tried to throw himself forward, as he was not in the front row. He took aim at his target and began to fire, extending his arm over the shoulder of Mrs. Julius Hauch, a shopkeeper who was at the front of the crowd. Hödel tried to push her, but she did not move, so he extended his arm to fire over her. However, she jostled him at the same moment, annoyed by his attempts to push her, which she attributed to a desire to see the Emperor more closely.

This movement, which jolted Hödel as he fired, deflected his arm as he opened fire, and the first bullet was lost in the air. Dissatisfied with having missed, the anarchist acted quickly: he knocked Mrs. Hauch unconscious with the pommel of his weapon and moved past her, approaching even closer to the Emperor. He then fired a second shot, which he missed, before jumping directly into the street. He fired once at one of his pursuers, then half-crouched to adjust a third and final shot at the Emperor. He missed this third shot as well.

The assailant fled on foot after missing, while Wilhelm I ordered his chasseur to catch and arrest him. Hödel fired twice at his pursuers and fought some of them off but was ultimately apprehended by the crowd and the hunters. He was nearly beaten to death but was saved by Carl Reinhold Gustav Kroger, a worker who intervened and rescued him, an act that led to Kroger's arrest for complicity in the attack before he was later cleared during the judicial proceedings.

Once arrested, Hödel declared that:

I am a friend of the Social Democrats, but the anarchists are my men. I have also read Bakunin.

The police found Social Democratic documents and Christian Social brochures on him, but nothing that directly affiliated him with the anarchists or anarchism.

=== Aftermath: second attack, trial, and execution of Hödel ===
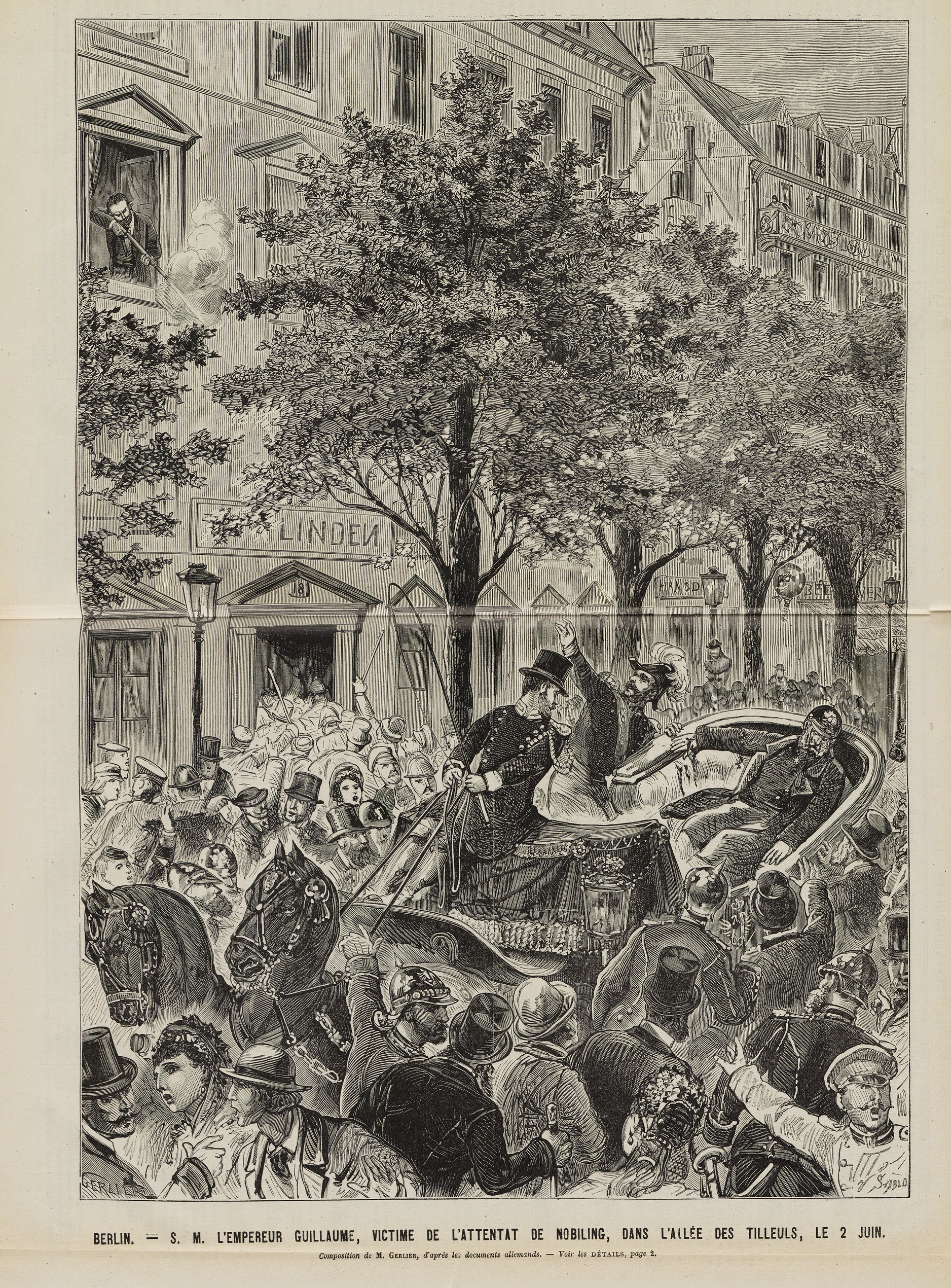
Nobiling's attack in La Presse Illustrée (16 June 1878)

Hödel, who perhaps thought he would die during the attack, found himself under arrest. He possibly hoped to receive 10 or 20 years in prison instead of the death penalty, though this is uncertain. He chose Otto Freytag as his lawyer, who requested 80 days to review the case documents and prepare a defense, which was denied. His lawyer was therefore court-appointed and showed little interest in defending the accused; he went so far as to apologize to the court for being appointed to the case during his first intervention.

The young man denied any affiliation with the anarchists and presented himself as a Christian Social or a Social Democrat. Most importantly, he was in the middle of judicial proceedings when Karl Nobiling, with whom he was possibly in contact before his own attack, committed the Nobiling assassination attempt, targeting the Kaiser with a similar modus operandi on 2 June 1878.

During his trial, one of the most damaging pieces of evidence provided was a seized letter written from prison to his parents, in which he declared that "he had sacrificed his life for the public good and his only regret was that his shots had gone astray, but that he hoped that his failure would not damaged the cause". He spent the entire trial with an ironic and mocking expression on his face. The jury took only 20 minutes to deliberate and sentence him to death, to which he responded with a burst of laughter.

In the prison where he was chained to prevent both escape and suicide, Hödel refused to appeal, declaring:

That wouldn't do any good, off with my head.

He requested the right to smoke in his cell, which was granted, and to see his parents, which was refused. On the eve of his execution, he agreed to a last meal and ate two beefsteaks with wine. Hödel raised the first glass and exclaimed 'Long live the Commune!' before eating. The young man wrote several letters, including a final one to his family, in which he wished them the best and also signed off with 'Long live the Commune!'.

Hödel spent the night preceding his execution, from 15 to 16 August 1878, smoking one cigarette after another. The prison guard who came for him at 6 A.M. found him sitting and smoking, after which he followed quickly, drank a glass of milk, and proceeded to the place of execution, which took three minutes from his cell. Upon arriving at the execution site, he rested his head for the first time and asked if this was the spot; then, as the sentence was read again, he cried out 'Bravo!'. Hödel then bared his chest at the request of the authorities and rested his head once more. He was beheaded by the executioner Scharfrichter Krautz in a single stroke.

== Analyses ==
=== Debates on Hödel's political orientation ===
Given that Hödel moved between several political parties before the attack, first being a member of the Social Democratic Party, then meeting anarchists, and finally joining the Christian Social Party, the anarcho-syndicalist theorist and historian Rudolf Rocker argued that he was a young man lost between several ideologies.

This view was largely challenged by historian Andrew Carlson in 1972, in his work Anarchism in Germany, who saw it as an anachronistic position. Indeed, while Hödel did start out in the Social Democratic Party, he followed a noticeable intellectual evolution that pushed him increasingly toward anarchist positions, which is precisely what led to his expulsion from the Social Democratic Party. The young man was not unintelligent; he had read several anarchist theorists, such as Bakunin, and on several occasions made remarks that were clearly anarchist or in favor of propaganda by the deed. Carlson sees his affiliation with the Christian Social Party shortly before the attack as an attempt to hide the links between his attempt and the anarchists by posing as an activist for a rival party.

=== The two attacks: a plot by the Anti-Authoritarian International? ===
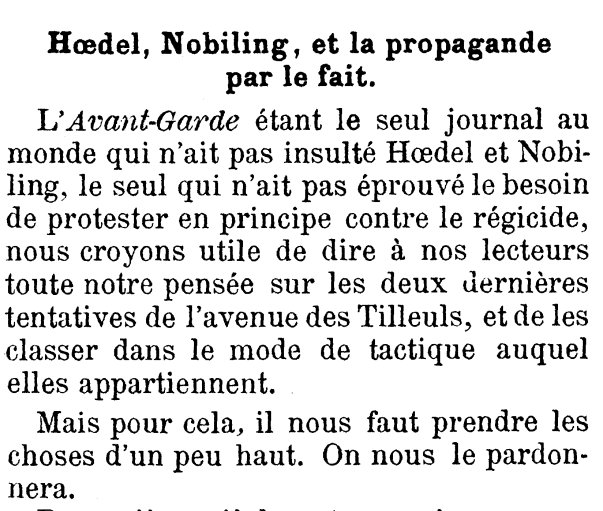
First lines of Hödel, Nobiling and propaganda of the deed in L'Avant-Garde, the press organ of the Jura Federation

According to Carlson, it is plausible to consider that Hödel's plot and Nobiling's plot were organized together in Leipzig by Emil Werner and other anarchists. Several elements suggest that these were two linked attempts, planned in advance. For instance, Werner, who was in close contact with Hödel, was himself a member of and linked to the Jura Federation, which was then theorizing propaganda by the deed. The historian highlights the fact that Hödel was a skilled marksman during his attempt, which implies weapons training he might have received alongside Nobiling; he was also able to live in Berlin for twenty days before his attack with unknown sums of money. Carlson writes in this regard:

It is my belief that both of the assassination attempts were masterminded by Emil Werner in Leipzig, but that the stimulus for them came from the German section of the Jura Federation in Switzerland. The evidence is not as conclusive as one could hope for, but in the course of the remainder of this chapter and in the next chapter materials will be introduced which tend to indict Werner and the Jura Federation.

According to him, however, although he had been in contact with Reinsdorf, it is probable that the latter's group had no link to these attacks by Hödel and Nobiling; rather, they were likely plots devised by Werner.

== Bibliography ==
- Baker, Zoe (2023), Means and Ends: The Revolutionary Practice of Anarchism in Europe and the United States, Edinburgh: AK Press, ISBN 978-1-84935-498-1
- Carlson, Andrew (1972), Anarchism in Germany, vol. 1, Metuchen, N. J.: The Scarecrow Press, Inc., ISBN 0-8 108-0484-0
- Eisenzweig, Uri (2001). Fictions de l'anarchisme [Fictions of anarchism] (in French). France: C. Bourgois. ISBN 2-267-01570-6.
- Enckell, Marianne (2012), La Fédération jurassienne, Genève - Paris: Entremonde, ISBN 978-2-940426-16-4
