= Bulletin de la Fédération jurassienne =

Swiss anarchist newspaper (1872–1878)

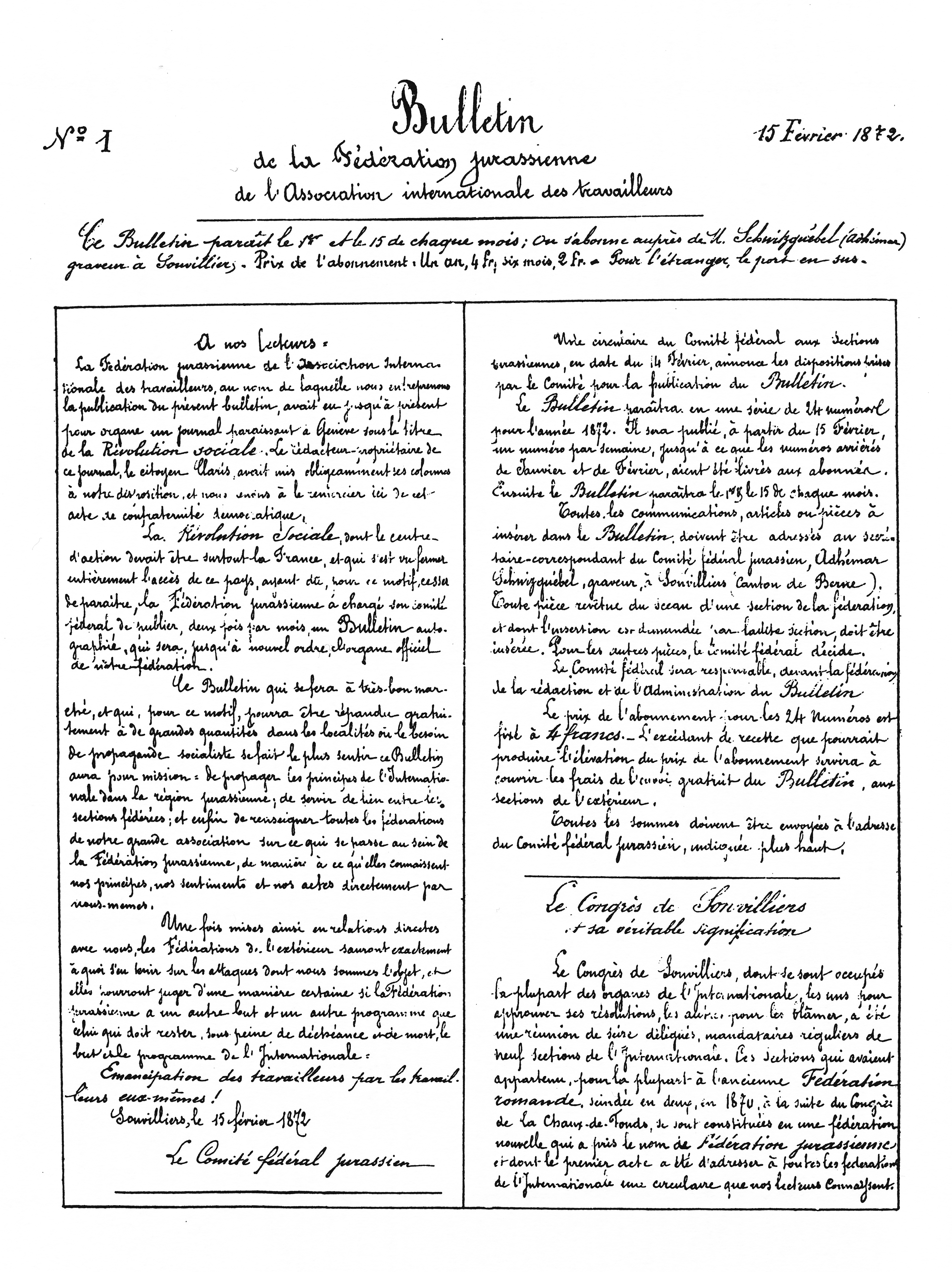
- The first issue of the newspaper
- Type: Weekly
- Founder(s): James Guillaume; Carlo Cafiero; Adhémar Schwitzguébel; Paul Brousse
- Editor: James Guillaume
- Founded: 15 February 1872
- Ceased publication: 15 March 1878
- Political alignment: Anarchism
- Language: French
- Headquarters: Sonvilier, Le Locle; La Chaux-de-Fonds
- Country: Switzerland
- Circulation: c. 600 copies
- Readership: Spain; Italy; France; Belgium

The Bulletin de la Fédération jurassienne (Bulletin of the Jura Federation) was an anarchist newspaper which was published between February 1872 and March 1878 in Sonvilier, Le Locle, and later in La Chaux-de-Fonds, Switzerland. It was one of the very first anarchist periodicals, serving as the official organ for the Jura Federation and the Anti-Authoritarian International during the foundational years of the anarchist movement. The Bulletin never exceeded a circulation of 600 copies per issue. However, some historians have argued that it played a very important role from both a theoretical and historical perspective.

After the schism of the First International between the anarchists and Marxists who clashed at the Hague and Saint-Imier congresses, the Bulletin de la Fédération jurassienne became the primary forum for exchange among the Federation's anarchists. Many notable figures from the movement's first generation, such as Carlo Cafiero, James Guillaume, Peter Kropotkin, and Adhémar Schwitzguébel, collaborated with it. Spanning 283 issues over six years, the Bulletin served as a platform for debating core aspects of anarchist theory and ideology. It focused on anarchist collectivism and syndicalism, and, starting in 1877, it began theorizing propaganda by the deed. After its dissolution, it was succeeded by L'Avant-Garde.

== The context of the Bulletin ==
The International Workingmen's Association (IWA), which was commonly known as The First International or just The International, was a workers' association which was founded in London in 1864. It was a synthesizing organization: it brought together figures such as Mikhail Bakunin, Karl Marx, James Guillaume, Friedrich Engels, Errico Malatesta, and Carlo Cafiero. Also various political movements were represented within it, which ranged from Marxism to anarchism, more moderate socialists and Proudhonists.

In 1872, shortly after the uprisings of the Insurrectionary communes in France, in particular that of the Paris Commune, the International split; the Marxists allied with the Blanquists to expel Bakunin at the Hague Congress. Bakunin and his allies then met at the Saint-Imier Congress in Switzerland, where they held significant influence, to expel Marx from the International and reform it under statutes guaranteeing the autonomy of member federations. These two congresses marked the schism within the International, which was henceforth divided into two parts: the Anti-Authoritarian International (1872–1880s) and the Marxist International (1872–1876).

The Anti-Authoritarian International, of which the Jura Federation was one of the primary federations, was a fundamental organization in the history of anarchism because it became, without intending to do so, the first anarchist organization. It influenced anarchism on many points of theory and practice, to the extent that it is often considered the central organization in the birth of the anarchist movement.

== The launch of the Bulletin ==
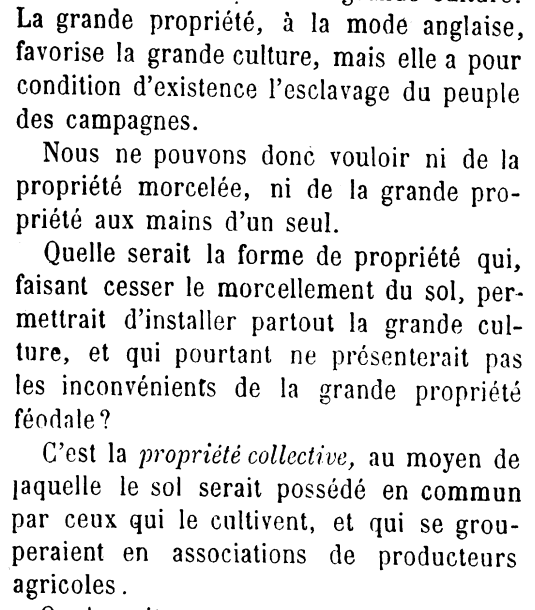
Bulletin de la Fédération Jurassienne on agriculture and division of agricultural land (27 February 1876)

In parallel with this general framework, the Jura Federation began publishing a Bulletin in February 1872, prior to the Hague and Saint-Imier congresses. James Guillaume, who historian Marianne Enckell (2012) described as 'unquestionably the primary figure in the history of the Jura Federation', was its chief organizer.

McKay (2022) documented that the circulation of the Bulletin was around 600 issues None of its articles were signed. However, it is possible to identify the authors through manuscripts preserved at the International Institute of Social History (IISG). The principal contributors throughout the journal's lifespan were: Paul Brousse, Carlo Cafiero, James Guillaume, Andrea Costa, B. Hubert, Peter Kropotkin, Gustave Lefrançais, Benoît Malon, Paul Robin, Adhémar Schwitzguébel, and Auguste Spichiger. The Bulletin served as the public voice for a number of notable anarchists from the movement's first and second generations. Despite its small circulation, the internationalism of the burgeoning anarchist movement was reflected in its distribution area, which spanned over a dozen countries: half of the published copies were sent abroad.

The Bulletin moved its operations between Sonvilier, Le Locle, and La Chaux-de-Fonds. Its last issue was published on March 15 1878, after which it was followed by the anarchist periodical, L'Avant-Garde. 283 issues were published.

== The legacy of the Bulletin ==
=== The Importance of the Bulletin to the formation and birth of anarchism ===
According to Bianco, the Bulletin 'played a very important role'. Indeed, beyond being one of the very first anarchist periodicals, it was the platform where central tenets of anarchist and socialist political theory were first developed. Between 1873 and 1875, the Bulletin championed anarchist collectivism and the involvement of anarchists in labor unions (syndicats). Enckell (2012) cited an article by Guillaume that is indicative of this orientation:

As we have often said, the utility of a strike lies not so much in the small material advantages gained today only to be lost tomorrow; it lies, above all, in the agitation it creates, which facilitates the grouping of workers, in the sense of solidarity it awakens, and finally, in the consciousness it fosters among workers—who until then remained indifferent—of the opposition between their interests and those of the employer.

The Bulletin was also one of the first publications to theorize propaganda by the deed in an article published on 5 August 1877, which stated:

Revolutionary socialists seek, through riots whose outcome they perfectly foresee, to stir the popular consciousness, and they succeed. Opportunist socialists blame these riots, calling them Putschs; they laugh at them and ridicule them to the great joy of the bourgeoisie—who fears them—at the very moment when those who took part are leaving for Siberia or appearing before courts to be sentenced, sometimes to life imprisonment. [...] Let us ask ourselves the meaning to be attributed to these acts: Kazan, Benevento, Bern. Did the men who took part in these movements hope to start a revolution? Were they under enough of an illusion to believe in success? No, obviously. To say that such was their thought would be to misunderstand them, or, knowing them, to slander them. The events of Kazan, Benevento, and Bern are quite simply acts of propaganda.

=== The importance of the Bulletin as a source for the history of the anarchist movement ===
Enckell (2012) described the Bulletin as being particularly important for both grasping anarchist thought, then in the process of formation and constitution, and for providing information on the later periods of the Anti-Authoritarian International, subjects which are generally less studied.
