= Le Travailleur (newspaper) =

Anarchist newspaper (1877–1878)

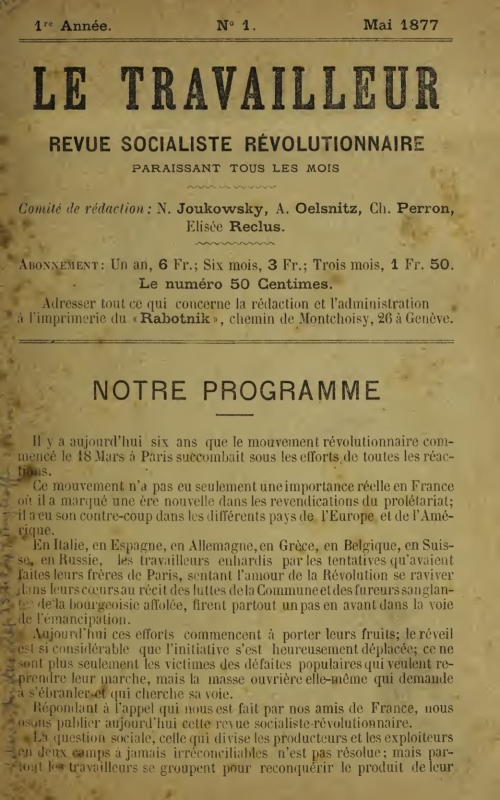
- Cover of the first issue of Le Travailleur
- Founder(s): Élisée Reclus, Charles Perron
- Founded: 20 May 1877
- Ceased publication: May 1878
- Political alignment: Anarchism
- Language: French
- Headquarters: Geneva
- Country: Switzerland

Le Travailleur (English: The Worker) was an anarchist newspaper published between May 1877 and May 1878 in Geneva, Switzerland. It was published in parallel with L'Avant-Garde, which succeeded it. Run by Élisée Reclus and Charles Perron, it published twelve issues. Following the disappearance of the Bulletin de la Fédération jurassienne, anarchists in Switzerland refocused their publications on L'Avant-Garde, leading to the disappearance of the title in May 1878.

== History ==
=== Context ===
In 1872, the Saint-Imier Congress established the Anti-authoritarian International, a foundational organization in the history of anarchism. The Jura Federation, one of the primary federations within the Anti-authoritarian International, published a bulletin which ran from 1872 to 1878. In its final issue, the Bulletin stated that it was ceasing publication due to a lack of subscribers and funds. It then invited its readers to turn to other publications, including Le Travailleur.

=== Le Travailleur ===
The title, launched on 20 May 1877, in Geneva, began publishing while the Bulletin was still in progress; another parallel organ, L'Avant-Garde, was published between 1877 and 1878 and ran parallel to Le Travailleur.

Élisée Reclus and Charles Perron were part of its editorial committee, but the contributors were more numerous and included, according to the review by René Bianco:

Arthur Arnould, Augustin Avrial, Mykhailo Drahomanov, G. Gérombou, Léon Hugonnet, Nikolay Zhukovsky, D. Klementz, Gustave Lefrançais, Lev Mechnikov, A. Oelsnitz, Z. Ralli, Élie Reclus, and Louis-Augustin Rogeard.

Spanning 12 issues with a variable frequency ranging from one issue every two weeks to one every two months, the newspaper ceased publication in May 1878 to redirect its subscribers toward L'Avant-Garde. It lasted almost exactly one year.

== Works ==
- Full collection on the Archives Autonomies website

== Bibliography ==
- Baker, Zoe (2023), Means and Ends: The Revolutionary Practice of Anarchism in Europe and the United States, Edinburgh: AK Press, ISBN 978-1-84935-498-1
- Berthier, René (2015), La fin de la première Internationale [The end of the First Internationale] (in French), Paris: Le Monde Libertaire, ISBN 978-2915514636
