= L'Avant-Garde =

Anarchist newspaper (1877–1878)

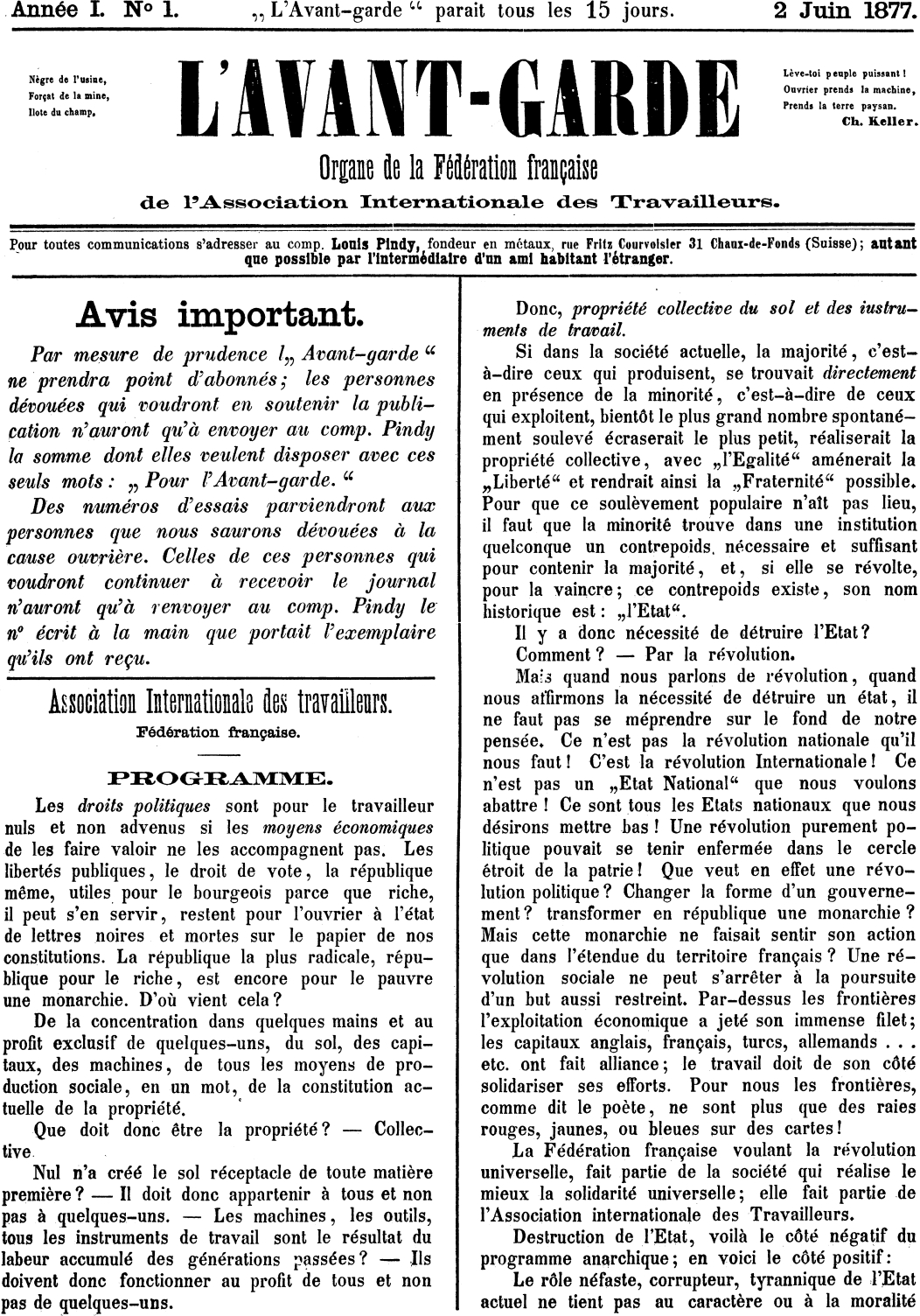
- Cover of the first issue of L'Avant-Garde - CIRA Lausanne
- Founder(s): Paul Brousse, Jean-Louis Pindy
- Founded: 2 June 1877
- Ceased publication: 2 December 1878
- Political alignment: Anarchism
- Language: French
- Headquarters: La Chaux-de-Fonds
- Country: Switzerland

L'Avant-Garde (English: The Vanguard) was an anarchist newspaper published between June 1877 and December 1878 in La Chaux-de-Fonds, Switzerland. The title served as the press organ for the clandestine French Federation and, subsequently, for the Jura Federation of the Anti-authoritarian International. It run parallel to Le Travailleur.

Following the disappearance of the previous anarchist periodical, the Bulletin de la Fédération jurassienne (1872–1878), L'Avant-Garde became their new primary platform for expression in French-speaking Switzerland. Originally launched as a clandestine propaganda initiative targeting France, the publication eventually pivoted to focus on the Swiss situation. it featured contributions from several prominent anarchists of the era, such as Jean-Louis Pindy and Peter Kropotkin.

Adopting propaganda of the deed more overtly than the Bulletin, the newspaper supported the assassination attempts by Hödel and Nobiling. This led to legal proceedings against Paul Brousse, one of its managers. The publication disappeared in December 1878 before being succeeded the following year by Le Révolté.

== History ==
=== Context ===
The anarchist movement, founded around the Saint-Imier Congress in Switzerland in 1872, began to spread across Western Europe. This congress established the Anti-authoritarian International (1872–1880s), a foundational organization in the history of anarchism. Although not initially intended as such, it became the first anarchist organization. It influenced the movement on numerous theoretical and practical points, to the extent that it is often considered the central organization at the birth of the anarchist movement. The Jura Federation was one of the primary federations within the Anti-authoritarian International.

Among these early publications were La Révolution sociale (1871–1872) and, most notably, the Bulletin de la Fédération jurassienne (1872–1878), which marked the federation's history. According to René Bianco, this second title 'played a very important role' for anarchism, but it disappeared in March 1878. In its final issue, the Bulletin stated that it was ceasing publication due to a lack of subscribers and funds. It then invited its readers to turn to other publications, including L'Avant-Garde.

=== L'Avant-Garde ===
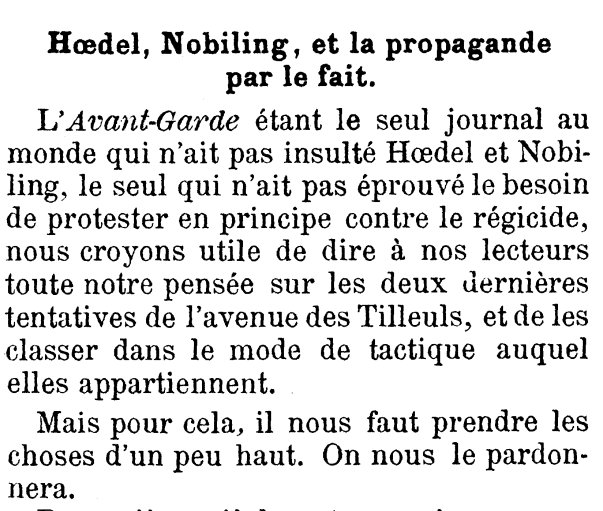
First lines of Hödel, Nobiling and propaganda of the deed in L'Avant-Garde

The title, launched on 2 June 1877, was primarily managed by Paul Brousse and Jean-Louis Pindy, but it also featured contributions from Peter Kropotkin. It ran parallel to another publication titled Le Travailleur ('The Worker') (1877–1878), which was published in Geneva. Initially, it served as an organ for clandestine propaganda directed toward France; however, its orientation shifted when it succeeded the Bulletin, becoming a more general organ for the Jura Federation.

Published in La Chaux-de-Fonds, it bore the subtitle 'organ of the French Federation of the International Workingmen's Association', later changing to 'Collectivist and Anarchist organ' from its 23rd issue onwards.

Following the assassination attempts by Hödel and Nobiling in May and June 1878, L'Avant-Garde published an article titled 'Hoedel, Nobiling and Propaganda of the Deed', rehabilitating them and honoring their memory. The newspaper supported propaganda of the deed more overtly than the Bulletin had, leading to the arrest of Brousse, who was prosecuted and convicted by the Swiss authorities.

The publication spanned 40 issues before ceasing on 2 December 1878. The ready-to-print version for the 41st issue was preserved and consulted by René Bianco to establish his entry regarding the title. L'Avant-Garde was succeeded by Le Révolté the following year.

== Bibliography ==
- Baker, Zoe (2023), Means and Ends: The Revolutionary Practice of Anarchism in Europe and the United States, Edinburgh: AK Press, ISBN 978-1-84935-498-1
- Berthier, René (2015), La fin de la première Internationale [The end of the First Internationale] (in French), Paris: Le Monde Libertaire, ISBN 978-2915514636
- Carlson, Andrew (1972), Anarchism in Germany, vol. 1, Metuchen, N. J.: The Scarecrow Press, Inc., ISBN 0-8 108-0484-0
- Enckell, Marianne (2012), La Fédération jurassienne, Genève - Paris: Entremonde, ISBN 978-2-940426-16-4
