= Le Travailleur =

Travailleur generally refers to:

- A worker, in French

Travailleur or Le Travailleur may also refer to:

== Media ==
- Le Travailleur, an anarchist newspaper published in Switzerland in 1877-1878

== Scientific press ==
- Labour/Le Travail, a scientific newspaper dedicated to social movements in Canada
