= Besançon Commune =

1871 revolutionary movement in Besançon

- Part of the aftermath of the Franco-Prussian War
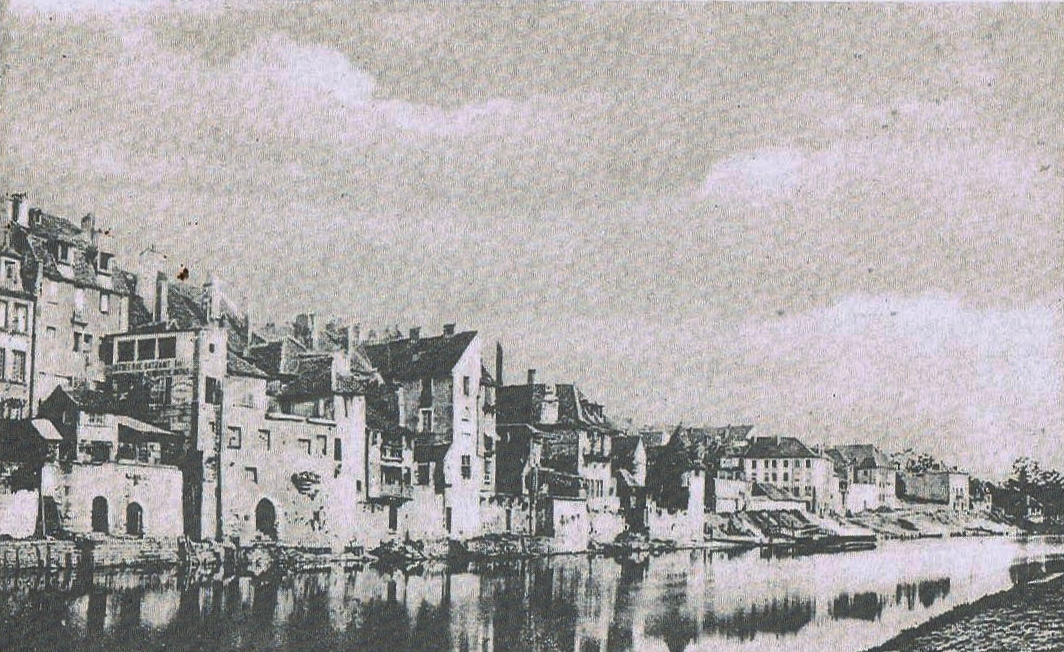
- Besançon-Battant, in 1860's.
Date	April – June 1871
Location	Besançon, France

Belligerents
(France) French Republic	Communards; National Guards; IWA

Commanders and leaders
	Séverin Robert; Vladimir Ozerov

The Besançon Commune (in French Commune de Besançon) was a short-lived revolutionary movement conceived and developed in 1871, aiming at the proclamation of a local autonomous power based on the experiences of the Paris and Lyon Communes. It originates from social upheavals which metamorphosed the city and with the emergence of unions, including a section of IWA in connection with the future Jura Federation.

The course of events was precipitated by the Franco-Prussian War, the fall of the Second Empire, and the advent of the Third Republic. While many notables testify to an insurrectionary context and armed support from Switzerland being organized, the correspondence left by James Guillaume and Mikhail Bakunin attest to a planned release between the end of May and the beginning of June 1871. However, with the start of the Semaine sanglante on 21 May and the pursuit of an internal campaign until 7 June, any attempt was seriously compromised.

Despite the hope of a restart, in the following weeks and months the idea of an insurrection was definitively abandoned, later reinforced by the extinction of groups and activities described as "anarchist" from 1875.
