= Jean-Louis Pindy =

French anarchist and Communard (1840–1917)

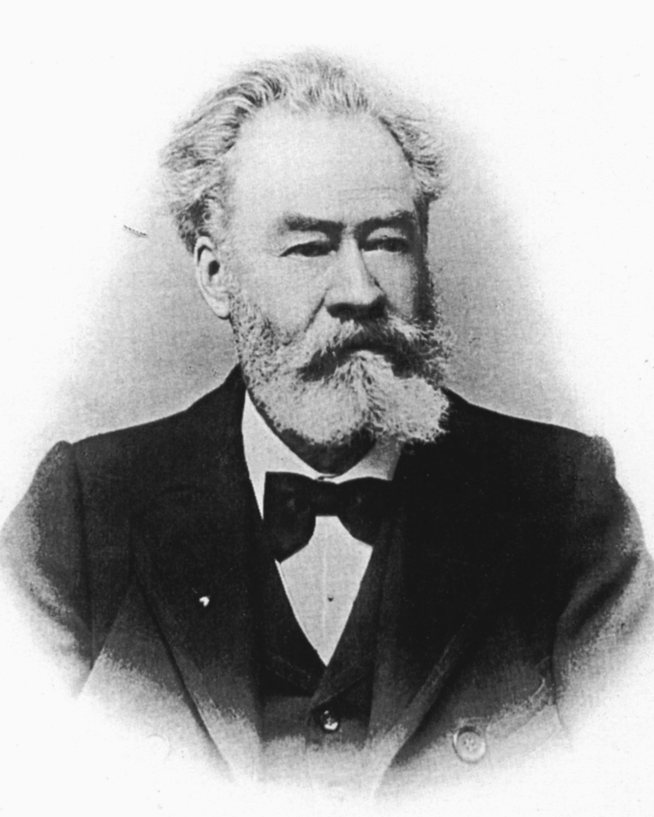
- Born: June 3, 1840; Brest, France
- Died: June 24, 1917 (aged 77); La Chaux-de-Fonds, Switzerland

Jean-Louis Pindy (1840–1917) was an anarchist and Communard who gave the order to burn down the Hôtel de Ville. He escaped to Switzerland after the Paris Commune.
