= Saint-Imier Congress =

1872 meeting of international anti-authoritarians

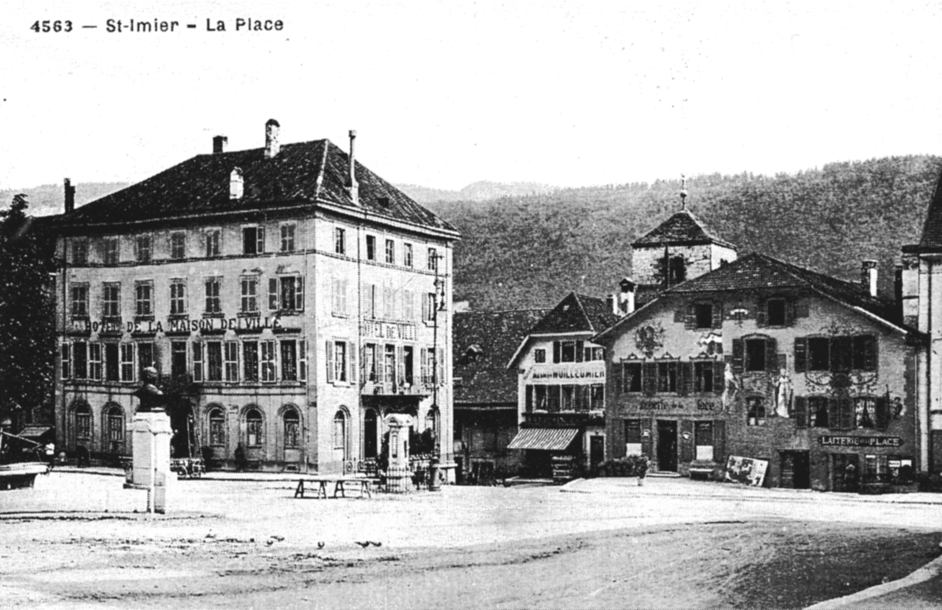
- The congress was held in one of the rooms of that location
- Date: 15–16 September 1872
- Locations: Saint-Imier, Switzerland
- Participants: 15 delegates
- People: Mikhail Bakunin; James Guillaume; Errico Malatesta; Carlo Cafiero; Adhémar Schwitzguébel; Gustave Lefrançais; Rafael Farga i Pellicer

The Saint-Imier Congress, held from 15 to 16 September 1872 in the eponymous town, was a congress led by the International Workingmen's Association (IWA), better known as the First International. It is one of the foundational events in the history of the labour movement, often considered the birth of the anarchist movement.

Following the International’s founding, numerous factions gathered within it, notably the Bakuninists or anti-authoritarians, comprising anarchists, collectivists, and anti-authoritarian socialists, who constituted the majority of the organisation, and the Marxists and Blanquists, who were allied and controlled the IWA's General Council. While these groups began as allies within the organisation, personal and theoretical conflicts arose between them, crystallised in the growing opposition between Mikhail Bakunin and Karl Marx. The two increasingly opposed movements were on the verge of rupture at the Hague Congress, where Marx, controlling its management, engineered the expulsion of Bakunin and James Guillaume, one of his Swiss allies.

This decision marked a break between the two movements, and the Bakuninists, caught off guard and pressed for time, decided to organise a counter-congress in Saint-Imier. They were joined by about fifteen delegates and decided to invalidate the decisions taken at The Hague and to refound the International based on statutes ensuring the autonomy and freedom of the federations composing it. The greater part of the International joined this reorganisation, without the Marxists and their Blanquist allies. Historiographically, it is called the Anti-authoritarian International to distinguish it from the unified International that preceded it and the parallel Marxist International.

The Saint-Imier Congress is often considered the or one of the foundations of the anarchist movement and has received various tributes over time, one of the most recent being the organisation of Anarchy 2023, a large-scale anarchist gathering, to celebrate the 150th anniversary of the congress.

== History ==
=== Context ===
==== Foundation of the First International and conflicts ====
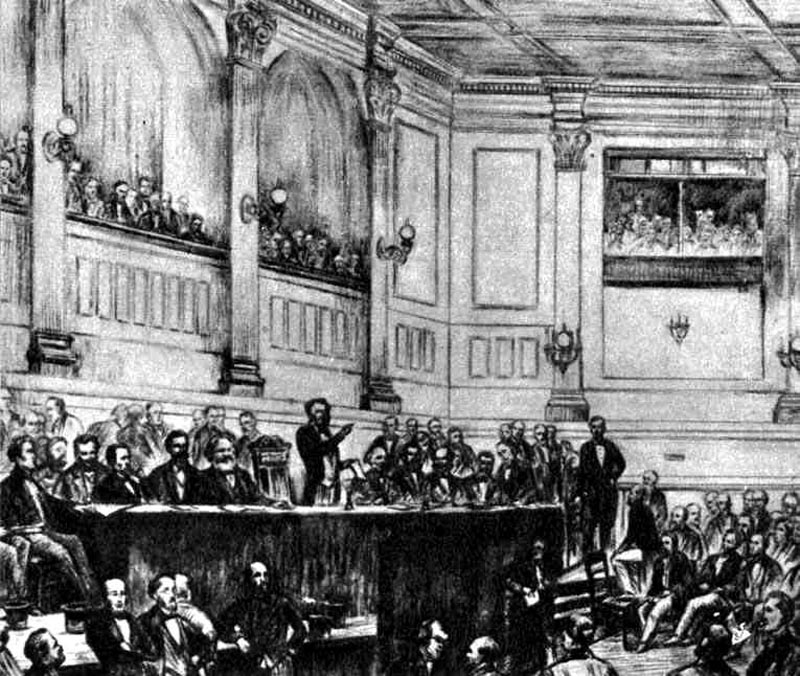
Founding of the First International in London (1864)

The International Workingmen's Association (IWA), or the First International, was a workers' association founded in London in 1864. It is a fundamental organization in the history of the workers' movement, quickly bringing together many figures linked to its history, such as Karl Marx, James Guillaume, Friedrich Engels, Errico Malatesta, and Carlo Cafiero. Different political movements were represented, ranging from Marxism to anarchism, as well as more moderate socialists and Proudhonists.

During the congresses held by the organization, central points of anarchism, Marxism, syndicalism, and socialism were debated, and the IWA served as an important theoretical and practical foundation for the birth of the workers' movement. Gradually, two main tendencies emerged within the organization: a Marxist tendency, gathered around Karl Marx and his allies, and an anti-authoritarian, anarchist and collectivist tendency, which also brought together moderate socialists and other groups, and which crystallized around Mikhail Bakunin and his allies, a large part of whom would become the anarchist movement. Bakunin, a Russian revolutionary with prestige in revolutionary groups, joined the IWA in Geneva in 1868 and actively participated in the founding of several groups of the International, such as the Jura Federation.

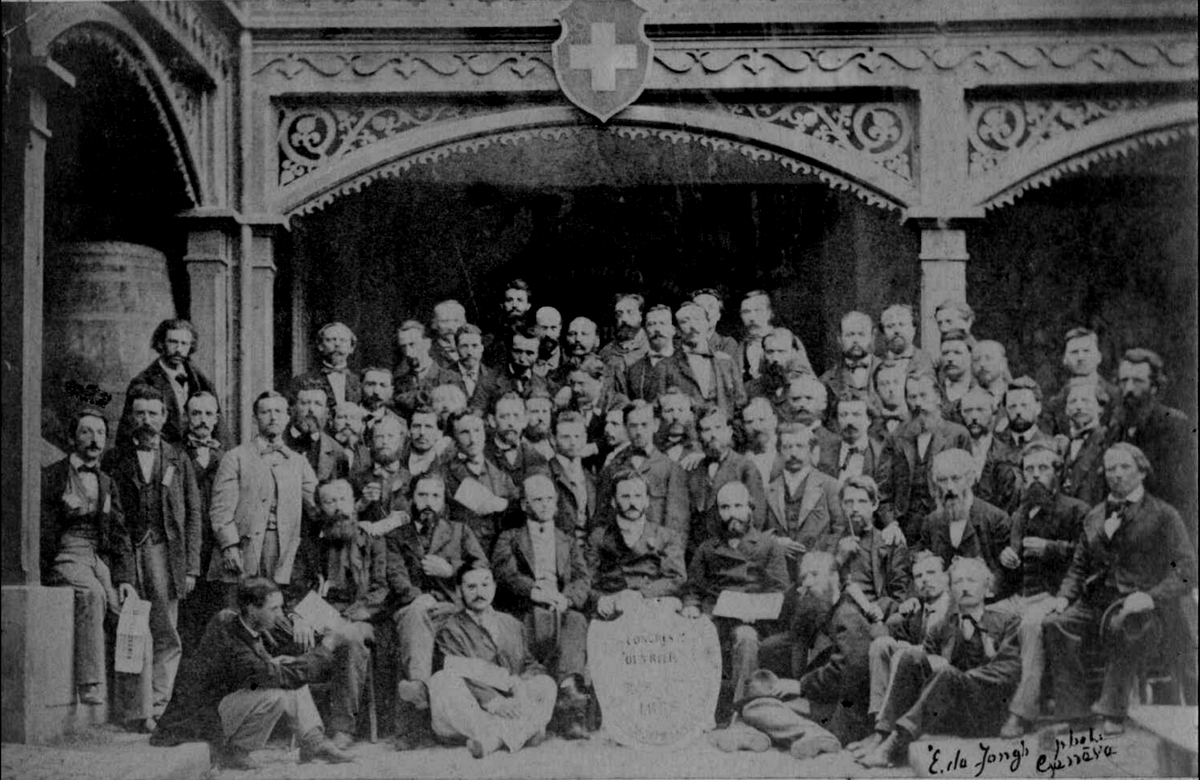
Geneva Congress of the First International, 1866

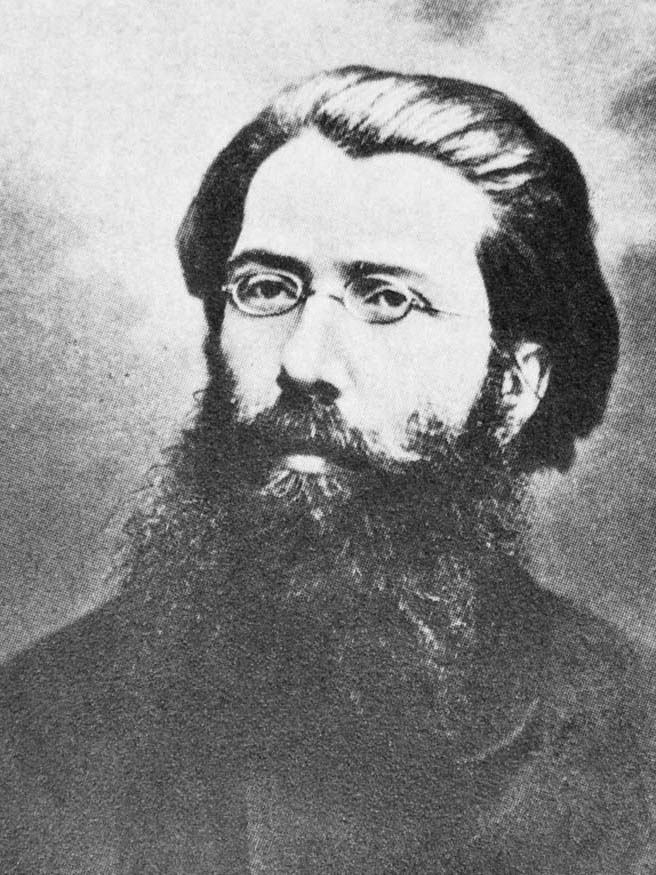
Carlo Cafiero, one of the figures of the Italian Federation (here in 1878)

Initially, these two factions were allied within the IWA. Bakunin sought to have Marx's Das Kapital published in Russia, and Cafiero translated it into Italian, but gradually, theoretical and personal conflicts began to oppose the two groups. Numerous theoretical and practical points separated them: Bakunin believed that criminals, sex workers, prisoners, beggars, and other marginalized groups could be revolutionary forces, while Marx held an 'abysmal scorn' for them, according to historian Hans Gerth. Furthermore, unlike the Marxists, who thought that to achieve communism—where all goods are commonly owned—it would be necessary to retain the State for a certain period, a supposedly transitional phase designated as the dictatorship of the proletariat, Bakunin estimated that this transitional phase was highly problematic and would lead toward dictatorship.

These theoretical and personal conflicts devolved into an organizational one: Marx and his allies, such as Engels and his son-in-law, Paul Lafargue, wanted the International to be a centralized organization controlled by the General Council that they dominated. On the other hand, the Bakuninists wished to stick to the organization's initial statutes, which gave strong autonomy to the national or regional federations and made the General Council merely a coordinating body between the different federations. They did not accept the statutory changes desired by Marx and demanded a congress. They viewed this move by Marx as highly problematic, and numerous federations were on the verge of breaking with him and the party he was constituting inside the First International.

These conflicts were amplified by the 'race for membership' that the two movements undertook to gather maximum support in the workers' movement. The Bakuninists managed to establish a very strong foothold in Spain (whose federation adopted explicitly Bakuninist lines), Italy, Switzerland, and France (where the International was banned). Overall, it is estimated that a majority of the AIT's federations and militants supported Bakunin in his conflict with the General Council constituted by the Marxists, with the Spanish federation alone forming a large part of the organization's membership at this point.

==== The Rimini and Hague Congresses ====
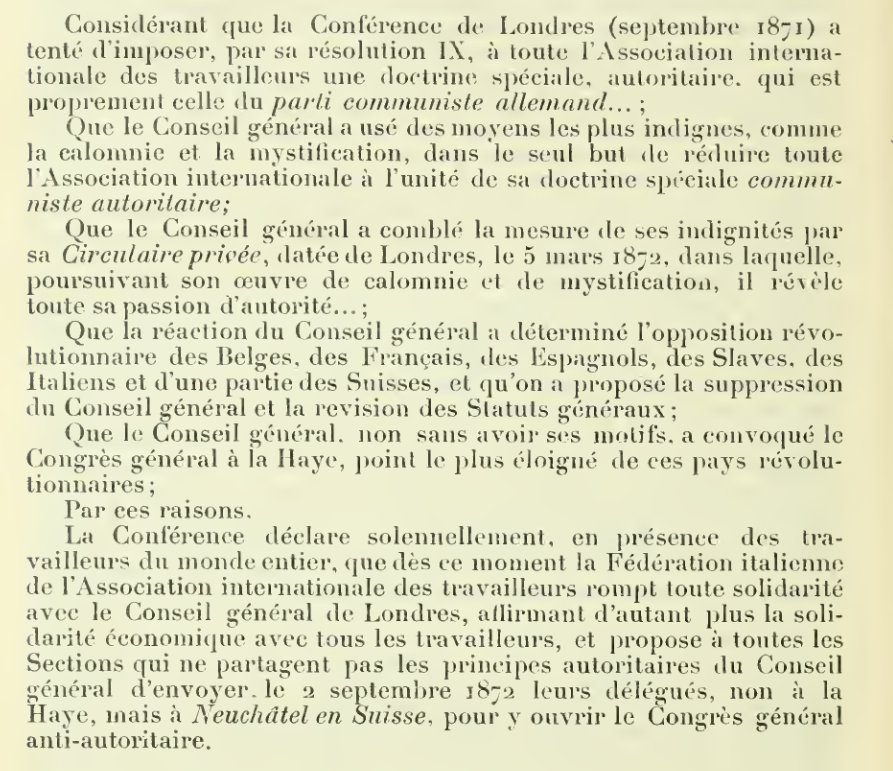
Decisions voted at the Rimini Congress

With the next International Congress approaching, and these conflicts expected to be a major and decisive debate, the Italian Federation, which was frankly aligned with Bakunin and included figures like Carlo Cafiero, Andrea Costa, and Errico Malatesta, called for a national congress in the early summer of 1872 to decide on their federation's path. While preparing for this congress, they learned that the Marxist General Council had chosen The Hague as the meeting place. This was a strategic choice intended to prevent strong participation from the Bakuninist federations. Bakunin himself was sought by the police in France and Germany for his participation in the Communes and could not travel to The Hague. The maneuver was also intended to move the central location of the International—until then situated in Switzerland, where several previous congresses had taken place—toward areas less controlled by the anarchists and their allies.

In this context, while Bakunin and the Jura Federation (composed of figures like James Guillaume) ultimately chose to accept the congress location and sought to gather as many delegates as possible to attend (made difficult by the fact that their bases of support were in Spain, Italy, and France, where the International was banned), the Italian Federation met in Rimini. Given the new developments, the Italian delegates—who were confronted with the congress location (deemed particularly un-neutral by the Bakuninists) and the strong-arm addition of the declaration that considerably strengthened the powers and prerogatives of the Marxist General Council—voted for the break with the General Council. The Italian Federation decided to call for a congress of delegates from the socialist, anarchist, and other anti-authoritarian federations to meet in Neuchâtel to exclude Marx and his allies from the organization and revert to the International's original statutes.

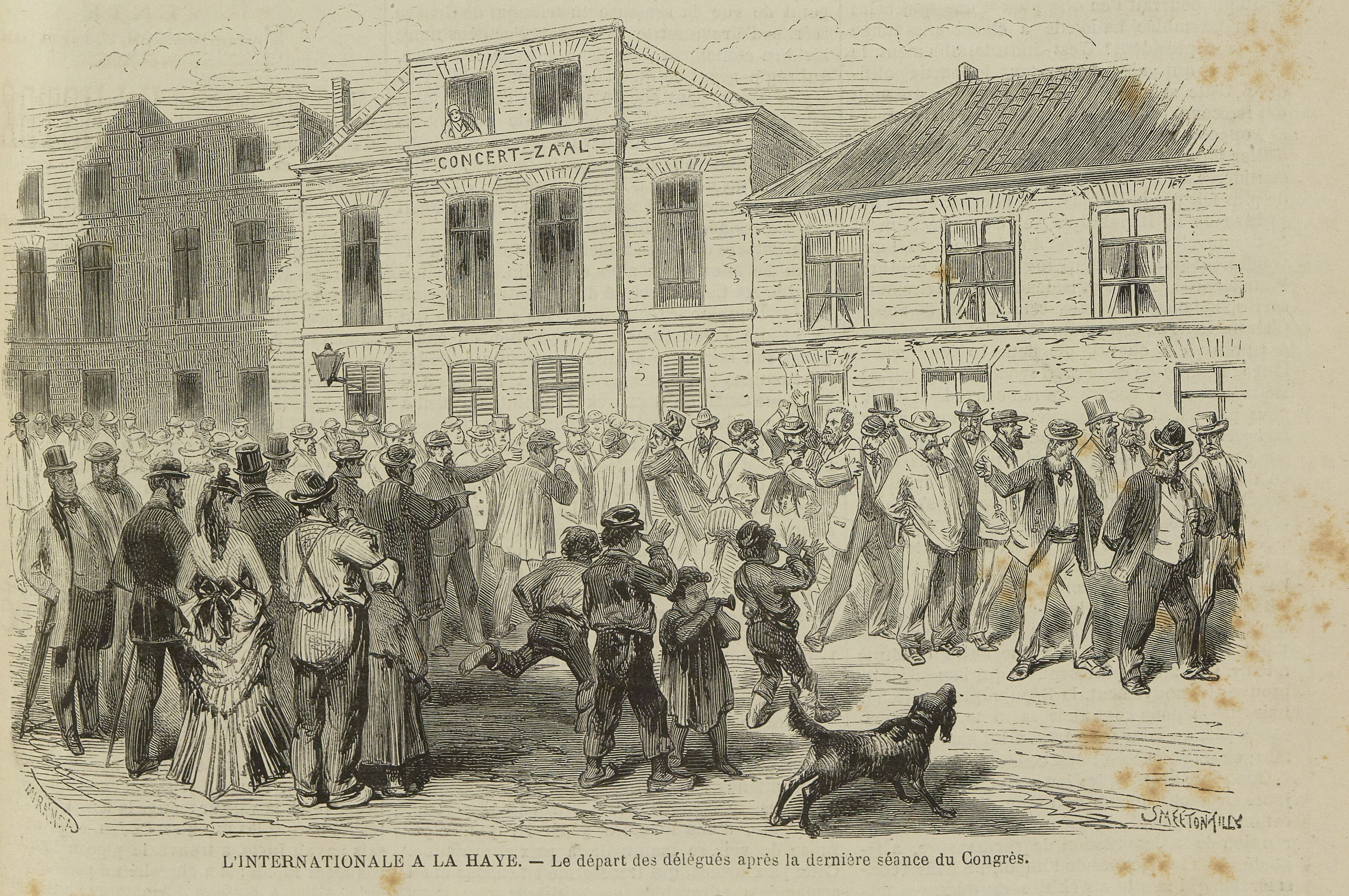
Crowds booing and insulting the delegates at the end of the Hague Congress

According to James Guillaume, following the Italian Federation's decision to exclude Marx and immediately convene an anti-authoritarian congress in Switzerland, Bakunin and he negotiated with them to ask them to delay the congress until after the Hague Congress—which was accepted. They advocated for a strategy of conciliation, supporting the sending of as many delegates as possible to the Hague Congress anyway, despite the organization being under the control of the Marxists.

Unfortunately for them, the Hague Congress, which they attended without the support of the absent Italian delegates, was organised by Marx and his allies. They ensured they had the majority through several relatively debatable procedures, such as the fact that some of their delegates did not have legal mandates or were unverifiable—they also attempted to prevent the Spanish Federation, by far the largest in terms of members, from participating. Bakunin could not attend: he was therefore replaced by James Guillaume and Adhémar Schwitzguébel, two Swiss who represented him and the Jura Federation. The Congress, whose every decision aligned with Marxist positions, voted for the exclusion of Bakunin and Guillaume from the International—it failed to vote for Schwitzguébel’s exclusion, who protested by declaring he was in solidarity with the other two and should be excluded as well. The Hague Congress concluded on 7 September 1872.

=== The Saint-Imier Congress ===
==== A crucial moment to 'save' the First International in the face of internal conflicts and preparatory congress ====
One of the symbols used by the Jura Federation

The exclusion of Bakunin and Guillaume at The Hague put the Bakuninists in a clear difficulty—if they let the situation unfold without action, it would amount to adopting the Marxist vision: even though the majority of the First International's federations leaned toward Bakunin. The Jura Federation then decided to 'fall back' on the plan proposed by the Italian Federation in Rimini: to organise an anti-authoritarian congress in Switzerland and regain control of the International. Given the critical situation, the congress had to open as quickly as possible, so as not to let time elapse between The Hague and the upcoming congress.

It was decided to convene the congress in Saint-Imier, a town in the Swiss Mittelland region. The congress was set to open on 15 September 1872, about a week after the closing of the Hague Congress. This speed of execution after The Hague explains the low number of delegates, as the Bakuninists, anti-authoritarians, and anarchists assembled their forces in haste.

On the morning of the 15th, a Jura Federation congress adopted two resolutions: accepting the holding of the international congress later that day; rejecting the exclusion of Bakunin and Guillaume concerning the proceedings of the Hague Congress; and confirming that the Jura Federation accepted the initiative launched by the Italian Federation to convene the Saint-Imier Congress in order to reform the International without the authoritarians, i.e., the Marxists and Blanquists. This preparatory congress was composed of the following delegates:

Mikhail Bakunin (Sonvillier), Charles Besnay (Neuchâtel), Fritz Chautems (Engravers and Guillocheurs of Le Locle), Édouard Collier (La Chaux-de-Fonds), François Delacoste (La Chaux-de-Fonds), Ali Eberhardt (Saint-Imier), Justin Guerber (Sonvillier), James Guillaume (Neuchâtel), Adolphe Herter (Engravers and Guillocheurs of Courtelary), Waldemar Holstein (Slavs of Zurich), Paul Humbert (Engravers and Guillocheurs of Le Locle), Paul Junet (Engravers and Guillocheurs of Courtelary), Georges Lachat (Moutier), Zemphiri Rouleff (Slavs of Zurich), Samuel Schneider (Saint-Imier), Léon Schwitzguébel (Bienne).

Furthermore, the Jura Federation decided that Guillaume and Adhémar Schwitzguébel would be the Federation's delegates during the upcoming Congress.

==== Delegates and organization ====
One hour later, the Saint-Imier Congress opened in the same room of the town hall. Fifteen delegates gathered in Saint-Imier: four for the Spanish Federation, six for the Italian Federation, two French delegates representing several clandestine sections—the International being banned in France—one delegate for two American sections, and finally, the two delegates of the Jura Federation. The names of the delegates are as follows:

Italian Federation

- Andrea Costa
- Carlo Cafiero
- Mikhail Bakunin
- Errico Malatesta
- Lodovico Nabruzzi
- Giuseppi Fanelli

Jura Federation

- James Guillaume
- Adhémar Schwitzguébel

Spanish Federation

- Charles Alerini
- Rafael Farga
- Nicolás Alonso Marselau
- Tomás González Morago

French sections

- Jean-Louis Pindy
- Camille Camet

American sections

- Gustave Lefrançais

Lefrançais, Cafiero, and Marselau were elected presidents of the congress while Alerini, Chopard, and Costa were elected secretaries in charge of translation, as the congress took place in three languages: Italian, Spanish, and French. Each delegate maintained that their choices were binding only upon themselves and awaited the subsequent approval of the Federations they represented.

==== Points discussed and measures adopted ====
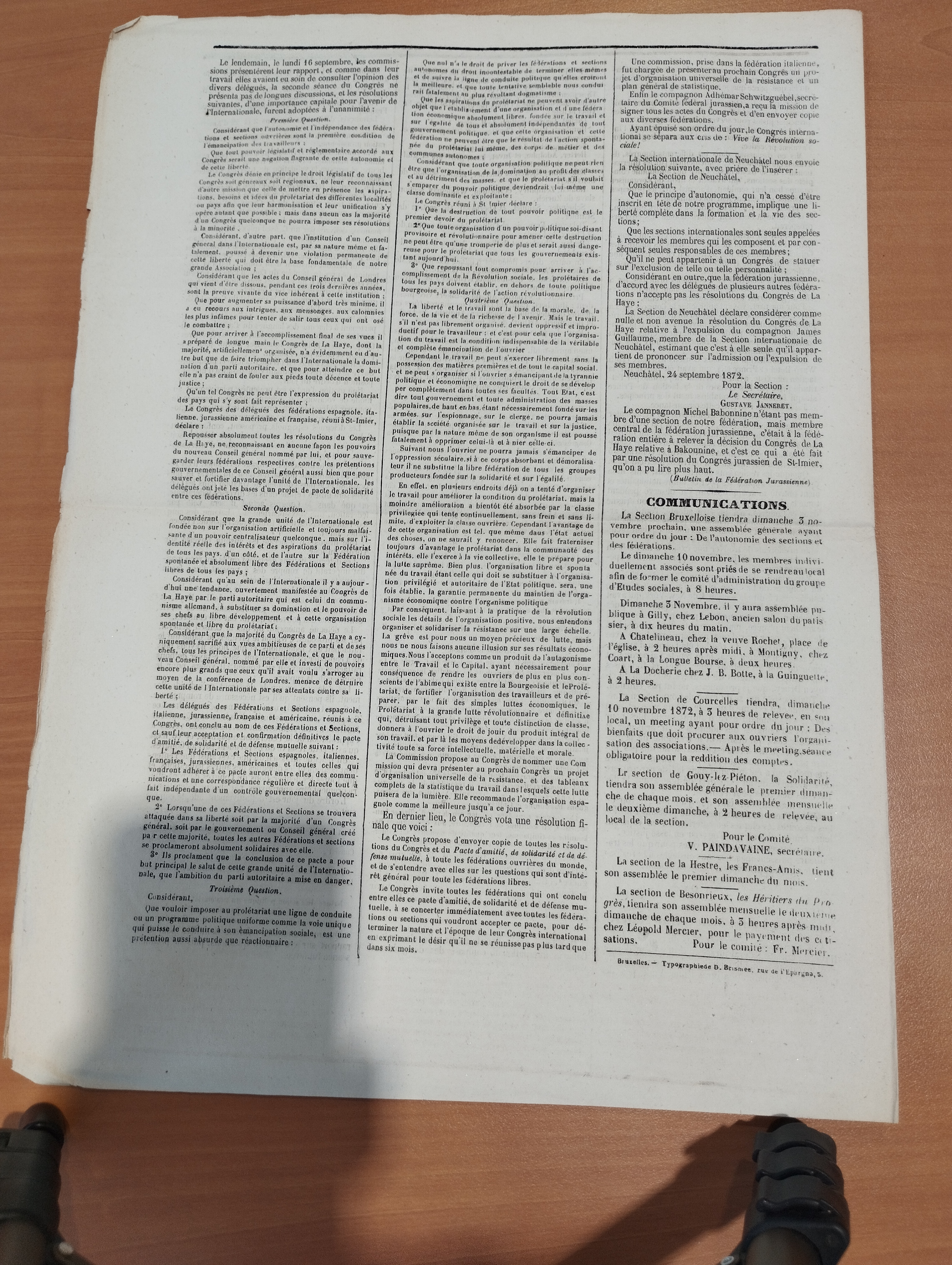
Resolutions of the Saint-Imier Congress in the Belgian newspaper L'Internationale (collection of Archives Anarchistes)

On the first day, the congress decided on the questions to be put on the agenda and selected four, forming four different commissions for each of the points in question:

Attitude of the Federations gathered in Congress at Saint-Imier, in the presence of the resolutions of the Hague Congress and the General Council. Pact of friendship, solidarity, and mutual defence between the free Federations. Nature of the political action of the proletariat. Organisation of the resistance of labour. — Statistics

The next day, the delegates met again, and each commission presented its report and a proposed resolution for adoption. Since the delegates spent the day and evening of the 15th in full discussions, all members were in agreement with the reports and measures. They were therefore all adopted unanimously by the delegates. The first resolution adopted the rejection of the Hague Congress and the General Council and announced the establishment of a 'new pact of solidarity' between the Federations to prevent such a centralisation of power from recurring within the International. The second was the pact of solidarity in question, where each Federation undertook to remain in contact with the others and to defend the other Federations against any infringement on their freedom of action, governmental or otherwise. The third resolution dealt with the political action of the proletariat and concluded with the following three points:

1. That the destruction of all political power is the first duty of the proletariat;
2. That any organisation of a supposedly provisional and revolutionary political power to bring about this destruction can only be another deception and would be as dangerous to the proletariat as all the governments existing today;
3. That, rejecting all compromise to achieve the realisation of the Social Revolution, proletarians of every land must establish solidarity of revolutionary action outside of all bourgeois politics.

These three points, which have since often been reiterated and synthesise a part of anarchist ideology, were not truly central to the delegates of that period, who were much more interested in the question of the pact of solidarity—thus, the organisation was relatively open to socialists during its early years.

The fourth resolution concerned the use of the general strike and syndicalist action to lead the Social Revolution: the congress adopted it while declaring itself aware of its limits and wishing to prepare a 'universal organisation of resistance' to organise the revolutionary struggle more effectively. Finally, the congress decided to send copies of these resolutions to all workers' federations worldwide, requesting their approval and that they join the International.

When the delegates separated, they shouted 'Long live the International'.

==== Reception ====
Although the congress was organised in great haste, a majority of the International's Federations and groups accepted it, and others joined and accepted these decisions without having been represented at the congress. Five years later, during the Verviers Congress led by the Anti-authoritarian International, the delegates, federations, and member groups hailed from France, Switzerland, Italy, Germany, Spain, Belgium, Greece, Uruguay, Argentina, and Mexico, which testifies to the expansion of the Anti-authoritarian International.

The Marxist International, emptied of its anti-authoritarian and anarchist forces, split between Marxists and Blanquists in the years following the Saint-Imier Congress, with the former managing to sideline the latter—which led to its disappearance in 1876, four years later.

== Legacy ==
=== A recomposition rather than a refoundation of the First International ===
Anti-authoritarian International and anarchist groups along the French-Swiss border in the early 1880s.

It is notable that not all delegates at St. Imier were anarchists or collectivists: indeed, rather than contemplating the foundation of a new organisation that would be purely anarchist, the delegates and Bakuninists sought, on the contrary, to safeguard the International, viewed as an inclusive organisation of multiple tendencies. Thus, Gustave Lefrançais, a French delegate for two American sections (3 and 22) and a veteran of the Paris Commune, was not strictly an anarchist but simply sympathetic and in agreement with the ideas of the Congress.

The upcoming Anti-authoritarian International was also open to a certain number of socialists, which caused debates between socialists and anarchists within the organisation until at least 1873–1874. The Verviers Congress, five years later, was distinctly less favourable to state socialists. These open orientations, both in the congress and in the Anti-authoritarian International, were notably due to the influence of Guillaume, who convinced Bakunin that a purely anarchist International would not receive the support of a majority of the federations.

The Swiss historian Marianne Enckell describes the congress as follows:

The international congress of Saint-Imier opened the series of congresses of what would be called the Anti-authoritarian International. Historiography has scarcely kept its memory, and only knows the IWA up until 1872. Yet, if the congress was the prelude to a long agony of the 'Marxist International', another organisation, more modest, more restricted, but which lived almost as long as the previous one, was being born, weaving close ties between workers from several countries in Europe and the New World. [...] The resolutions of the St. Imier Congress and the constitution of a federative link between the Federations of the International—and the new groups that would join them—mark the definitive rupture with the General Council this time. The latter, moreover, is but a phantom since it was transferred to New York, since no real organisation has pledged allegiance to it, since it is manipulated from London, then abandoned by Marx and Engels, since the IWA in its orthodox form ceases to exist in 1876 but had been moribund since 1872.

=== Foundation of the anarchist movement ===
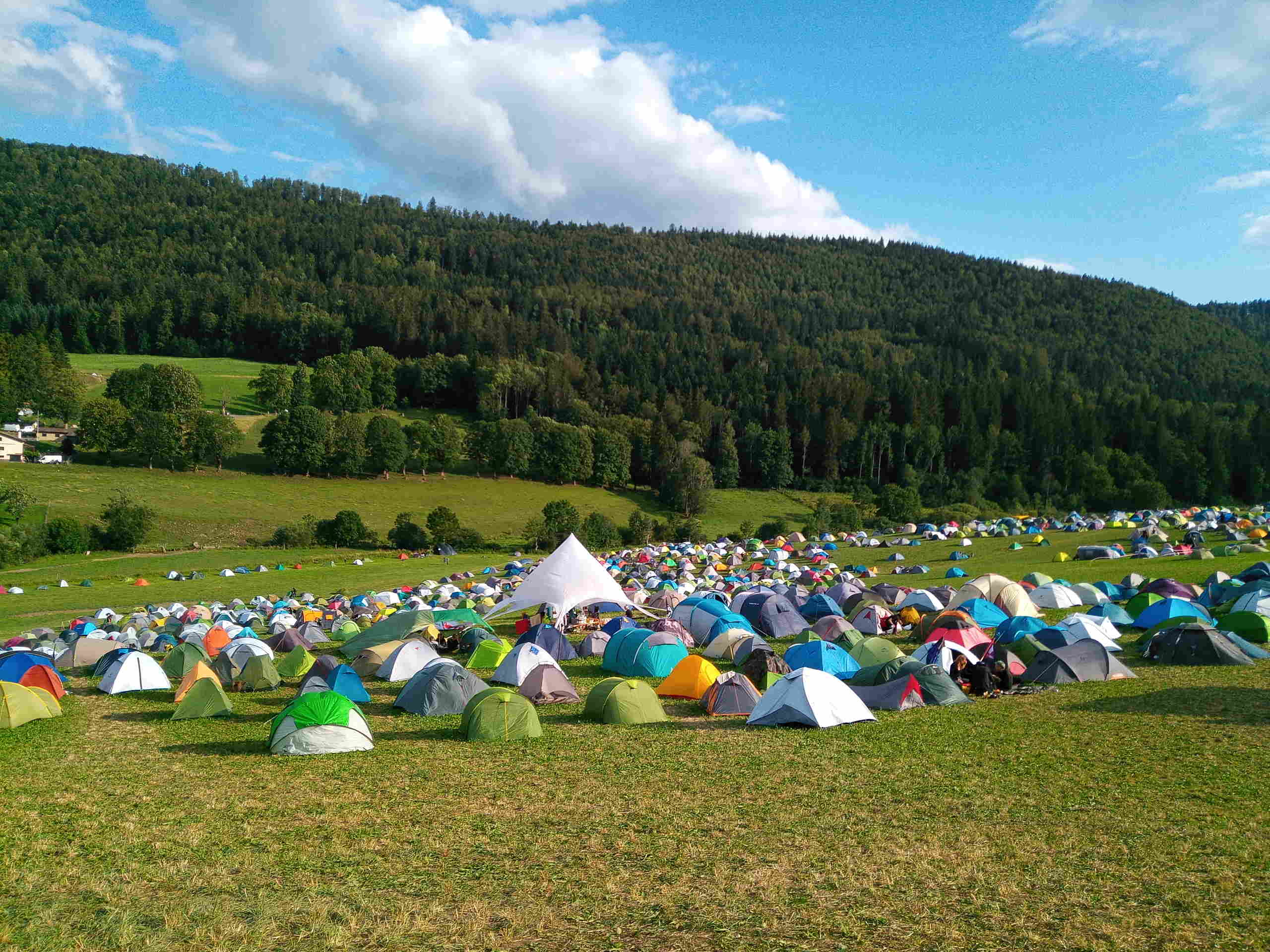
Main camping location in Saint Imier during Anarchy 2023

Historiographically, this congress marks the birth of the Anti-Authoritarian International, meaning the anti-authoritarian part of the First International gathering various tendencies, a notable number of which subsequently joined the anarchist movement. It is a fundamental organisation in anarchist history, becoming—although not conceived as such initially—the first anarchist organisation. It influenced anarchism on many points of theory and practice, so much so that this congress, through the points it adopted and this orientation, is often considered the foundation or one of the main foundations of the anarchist movement. Reflecting about this influence, historian Davide Trucato wrote:

It is ironic that the birth of the movement that is least associated with organization and officialdom can be traced to a specific date and event—a congress, moreover. Yet anarchism as a movement unquestionably dates from the St. Imier Congress of 15-16 September 1872, where the federalist branch of the First International laid out its constitutive principles, in open contrast with those of the marxist branch.

The Anti-Authoritarian International disappeared in the 1880s, giving way to other forms of organisation and coordination among anarchists, such as companionship or anarcho-syndicalism.

== Tributes and influence ==
In 1922, the anarchist newspaper Le Réveil ('The Awakening') reasserted the significance of the congress for its fiftieth anniversary, arguing that the principles expressed there were fundamental principles of the anarchist movement.

In 2012, 4,000 anarchists gathered in Saint-Imier.

In 2023, with the year having been delayed by one year due to the COVID-19 pandemic, the International of Anarchist Federations (IAF), one of the main contemporary anarchist organisations, organised Anarchy 2023, a large-scale anarchist gathering in Saint-Imier for the 150th anniversary of the congress. It is possibly the largest anarchist gathering of the 21st century.

== Primary sources ==
- Resolutions of the Saint-Imier Congress on The Anarchist Library

== Bibliography ==
- Baker, Zoe (2023), Means and Ends: The Revolutionary Practice of Anarchism in Europe and the United States, Edinburgh: AK Press, ISBN 978-1-84935-498-1
- Bébin, Lionel (1996), Les tentatives de reconstituer la Première Internationale et les débuts du mouvement anarchiste à Lyon (mémoire) [The Attempts to Reconstruct the First International and the Beginnings of the Anarchist Movement in Lyon, 1871–1881 (memoir)], Lyon: University Lyon II
- Berthier, René (2015), La fin de la première Internationale [The end of the First Internationale] (in French), Paris: Le Monde Libertaire, ISBN 978-2915514636
- Enckell, Marianne (2012), La Fédération jurassienne, Genève - Paris: Entremonde, ISBN 978-2-940426-16-4
- Gerth, Hans (1958), The first International: minutes of the Hague congress of 1872, with related documents, Madison: University of Wisconsin Press (UWP), OCLC 1034670000
- Guillaume, James (1906), L'Internationale : Documents et souvenirs (1864-1878) (t. 1-2) [L'Internationale : memories and documents], vol. 2, Paris: Société nouvelle de librairie et d'édition
- Guillaume, James (1909), L'Internationale : Documents et souvenirs (1864-1878) (t. 3) [L'Internationale : memories and documents], vol. 2, Paris: Société nouvelle de librairie et d'édition
- Levy, Carl (2019), The Palgrave Handbook of Anarchism, Cham: Palgrave Macmillan, ISBN 978-3-319-75619-6
- Pernicone, Nunzio (1993), Italian anarchism: 1864-1892, Princeton: Princeton University Press (PUP), ISBN 978-1904859970
