= August Reinsdorf =

German anarchist and terrorist (1849–1885)

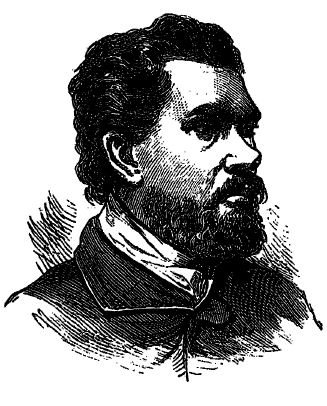
- Born: Friedrich August Reinsdorf; 31 January 1849; Pegau, Kreishauptmannschaft Leipzig, Kingdom of Saxony
- Died: 7 February 1885 (aged 36); Roter Ochse, Halle an der Saale, Province of Saxony, Kingdom of Prussia
- Cause of death: Decapitation
- Other name: Pelsenbach
- Occupation: Journeyman typesetter
- Known for: Attempted assassination of Wilhelm I
- Political party: SDAP
- Other political affiliations: IWA
- Movement: Anarchism
- Criminal penalty: Sentanced to death by the Reichsgericht
- Parents: Friedrich August Reinsdorf (father); Christinae Emilie (mother)

August Reinsdorf (1849–1885) was a German anarchist known for his attempted assassination of Kaiser Wilhelm I.

== See also ==
- Anarchism in Germany
