= Jura Federation =

Anarchist, Bakuninist faction of the 19th century First International

- Founder: Mikhail Bakunin
- Dates active: 1872-first half of the 1880s
- Active regions: Swiss Jura, with important links abroad
- Ideology: Anarchism; Collectivist anarchism; Anarcho-communism
- Political position: Far-left
- Status: Defunct
- Part of: Anti-authoritarian International

The Jura Federation (French: Fédération jurassienne) was a federation of the anti-authoritarian International founded in the Jura region in 1872. It was one of the most prominent branches of the anti-authoritarian International and was one of the driving forces of that organization, being founded directly after the split between anarchists and Marxists during the 1872 Hague Congress and uniting many figures of anarchism over time, including Mikhail Bakunin, Peter Kropotkin, James Guillaume, Élisée Reclus, Adhémar Schwitzguébel, Severino Albarracín, Carlo Cafiero, Errico Malatesta, Jean Grave or Antoine Perrare.

The Canton of Jura, a Swiss area, was known for its watchmaker artisans in La Chaux-de-Fonds, who shared anti-state, egalitarian views on work and social emancipation. The Jura Federation formed between international socialist congresses in 1869 and 1871. When the First International's General Council, led by Marxists, suppressed the Bakuninists, the Jura Federation organized the Anarchist St. Imier International of the disaffected federations at the 1872 St. Imier Congress.

The 1872 St. Imier Congress disavowed the General Council's authoritarian consolidation of power and planning as an affront to the International's loose, federalist founding to support workers' emancipation. Members of the First International agreed and even state socialists joined the anti-statists' resulting Anti-authoritarian International; by 1876, the alliance had mostly dissolved. While in decline, the Jura Federation remained the home of Bakuninists whose figures engaged on a two-decade debate on the merits of propaganda of the deed. The egalitarian relations of the Jura Federation had played an important role in Peter Kropotkin's adoption of anarchism, who became the anarchist standard-bearer after Bakunin.

== History ==
The Jura became the geographic center of the First International's anarchist coalition under luminary Mikhail Bakunin in the late 1860s and early 1870s, assisted by the Swiss government's laxity toward political agitators. The Jura Federation formed during infighting in the International between Bakunin and Karl Marx's factions. The Jura Federation split during the Fédération Romande congress of the International, in January 1869. Though Bakunin's faction was larger, the International's General Council was Marxist, and did not recognize the Jura Federation for its relation to Bakunin. The group was formally inaugurated at the 1871 Congress of Sonvilier. Their founding treatise, the Sonvilier Circular, held positions against the state and against the General Council, which the Jura charged with turning free and autonomous parts of the International into an authoritarian hierarchy. The Federation started its journal, Bulletin de la Fédération jurassienne, in February 1872 to explicate its stance against the General Council.

The Jura Federation organized a group of the First International's apostate factions at the September 1872 St. Imier Congress. The Bakuninists from Jura, France, Italy, Spain, and the United States reaffirmed their Sonvilier Circular position and charged the General Council with violating the premises of their partnership: the autonomy of the federations and their ultimate cause: workers' emancipation. The St. Imier coalition agreed to a solidarity pact to ensure the member federations' independent autonomy and their common union against the General Council. The Bakuninists rebuked the General Council for its centralization of political power and advocation for uniform action towards social emancipation. The coalition would become the Anti-authoritarian International, as formalized at the 1873 Congress of Geneva, and it held that only the proletariat masses could seek social emancipation for themselves through free, spontaneous action and egalitarian economic federation: It could not be imposed from hierarchy.

Members of the First International largely supported the St. Imier congress, and opposed the General Council's suppression of the Bakuninists at the 1871 London Conference and 1872 Hague Congress. As a result, the Anti-authoritarian International congresses in 1873 and 1874 attracted Belgian, English, Dutch, and German federations into the fold, along with the First International's statist and anti-statist factionalism. The English Federation, for example, explicitly disagreed with the Jurassian position on action, but as long as the federations were free to pursue their own methods, affirmed the higher purpose of restoring a federalist International. The Jura argued for abstention from political action, citing their fruitless experiences with parliamentary politics and their subsequent organization outside political parties. By 1876, the alliance between the statists and anti-statists had mostly dissolved and the Jura Federation was in decline. The Jura watchmakers cooperative in La Chaux-de-Fonds had a work shortage and the group's isolation from the general population had worn them.

Bakunin retired from the Jura Federation in 1873 and died three years later. Jura remained a continuation of Bakunin's International alliance and Peter Kropotkin became the international anarchist standard-bearer. Jura was particularly influential in Kropotkin's adoption of anarchism. Skeptical of the First International's leadership in Geneva, had visited the organization's other stronghold, in Jura in 1872, where he was impressed by their egalitarian ethics, independence of thought, devotion to the cause, and opposition to the International's authoritarian elements. "After a week's stay with the watchmakers," he wrote, "my views on socialism were settled. I was an anarchist." He then returned to Russia and did not re-involve himself until 1877, the year after he escaped from Russia.

Major figures at Jura included James Guillaume, Adhémar Schwitzguébel, Severino Albarracín, Carlo Cafiero, Errico Malatesta, and Élisée Reclus. They discussed the practical and theoretical tenets of anarchist socialism, particularly "propaganda of the deed", whose question became associated with the group in 1876 and was debated for two decades. Adherents such as Malatesta and the Italian anarchists quickly adopted the tactic, while Guillaume was hesitant. Up until this time, the anarchist philosophy had flourished in small artisan communities, such as the watchmakers in Jura, and propaganda of the deed was intended to bond anarchist and workers' groups, as had been done in Spain and Italy. Upset by Kropotkin's advances, Guillaume left Jura in 1878.

An 1880 congress of the Jura Federation, in La Chaux-de-Fonds, adopted "anarchist communism" as its doctrine, as did many anarchists outside Spain, since the latter's anarchism was more dependent on trade unions. Schwitzguébel and his adherents in Jura were reticent at the adoption of communism over collectivism.

== Primary sources ==
=== Jura Federation publications ===
- Bulletins of the Jura Federation (1872-1878)

=== Police sources ===
==== AD of the Rhône - 4 M 307 - courtesy of Archives Anarchistes ====
- Report of 20 August 1882 (in French) by a special commissaire of the Rhône prefecture
- Report of 22 August 1882 (in French) by the same person

== See also ==
- Anarchism in France
- Anarchism in Switzerland
- Paul Brousse
- Lyon and Besançon Commune

== Bibliography ==
- Cahm, Caroline (2002). Kropotkin: And the Rise of Revolutionary Anarchism, 1872–1886. Cambridge University Press. ISBN 978-0-521-89157-8.
- Esenwein, George Richard (1989). Anarchist Ideology and the Working-class Movement in Spain, 1868-1898. University of California Press. ISBN 978-0-520-06398-3.
- Guérin, Daniel, ed. (2005). No Gods, No Masters. Translated by Sharkey, Paul. Oakland: AK Press. ISBN 978-1-904859-25-3.
