= Basel Congress (1869) =

4th Congress of the International Workingmen's Association (IWA)

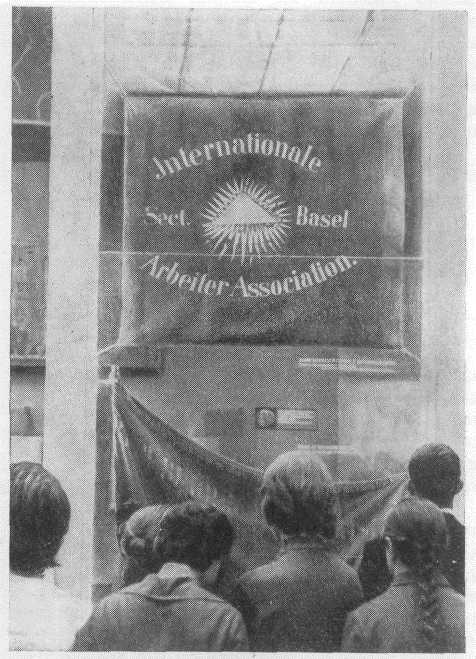
International Workingmen's Association – Basel section banner. Photo taken at (now defunct) museum of Karl Marx and Frederick Engels, USSR, Moscow

The Basel Congress of 1869 is the common name assigned to the 4th General Congress of the International Workingmen's Association (IWA), commonly known as the First International. The meeting was held in the city of Basel, Switzerland from September 6 to 12, 1869 and was attended by 75 delegates, representing the socialist and labor movements of United States, England France, Belgium, Germany, Austria, Switzerland, Italy, and Spain.

The conference was mainly noted for the confrontation between the Proudhonist mutualists and the collectivist position, defended by Marx's envoy for the General Council and Bakunin both. But the Belgian socialist de Paepe played a decisive role in bringing the Belgian delegation across to the collectivist side and isolating the mainly French Proudhonists.

== Delegates ==
According to G. M. Stekloff's account, in attendance were:

Seventy-five delegates assembled: from Great Britain, the 6 members of the General Council, Applegarth, Eccarius, Cowell Stepney, Lessner, Lucraft, and Jung; from France, which sent 26 delegates, among whom we may mention Dereure, Landrin, Chémalé, Murat, Aubry, Tolain, A. Richard, Palix, Varlin, and Bakunin: Belgium sent 5 delegates, among whom were Hins, Brismée, and De Paepe; Austria 2 delegates, Neumayer and Oberwinder; Germany sent 10 delegates, among whom were Becker, Liebknecht (Member of Parliament), Rittinghausen, Spier (Party chairman) and Hess; Switzerland had 22 representatives, among whom were Burkly, Greulich, Fritz Robert, Guillaume, Schwitzguébel, and Perret; Italy sent but one delegate, Caporusso; from Spain there came Farga-Pellicer and Sentinon; and the United States of America was represented by Cameron. Jung was elected chairman of the congress.

Name	Affiliation	Country	Perspective	Notes
Andrew Cameron	National Labor Union	United States of America
Robert Applegarth	Amalgamated Society of Carpenters and Joiners	Great Britain		Delegate of the General Council
Benjamin Lucraft		Great Britain
John Cowell-Stepney	Delegate of General Council	Great Britain		Editor of Social Economist
Hermann Jung	Delegate of General Council	Great Britain		Elected chair of congress
Johann Eccarius		Great Britain
Frederick Lessner		Great Britain
Émile Aubry		France
Jean-Claude Creusot		France
Eugène Pieton		France
Wilhelm Liebknecht	Social Democratic Workers' Party of Germany	Prussia
