= List of anarchist congresses =

Over the past 150 years, anarchists, anarcho-syndicalists and libertarian socialists have held many congresses, conferences and international meetings in which trade unions, other groups and individuals have participated.

== First International ==
The First International was an organization that aimed at uniting a variety of different left-wing groups and trade unions that were based on the working class and class struggle. Anarchists participated in the First International until their expulsion in the Hague Congress.

- 1st Congress of Geneva (Switzerland), 3–8 September 1866.
- 2nd Congress of Lausanne (Switzerland), 2–8 September 1867.
- 3rd Congress of Brussels (Belgium), September 1868.
- 4th Congress of Basel (Switzerland), September 1869.
- 5th Congress of The Hague (Netherlands), 2–7 September 1872.

== Anti-authoritarian International ==
After the Hague Congress (1872), which saw the expulsion of the anarchists Mikhail Bakunin and James Guillaume, it was decided to hold a Congress of the anti-authoritarian Sections and Federations of the International, including the Jura Federation, in St. Imier, Switzerland. The Congress was attended by delegates of the International federations in Italy, Spain, the United States, France and French-speaking Switzerland.

This congress was not considered by the anarchists as the first of a new international organization, but rather the continuation of the old International. It rejected the modifications to the General Rules of the IWMA that had been decided at the London Conference (1871) and the Hague Congress (1872).

=== Congresses of the Anti-authoritarian IWMA ===
- International Congress of St. Imier (Switzerland), 1872.
- (6th) Congress of Geneva (Switzerland), 1873.
- (7th) Congress of Brussels (Belgium), 1874.
- (8th) Congress of Bern (Switzerland), 1876.
- (9th) Congress of Verviers (Belgium), 1877.

== Other congresses ==
A number of local or regional congresses were held after the end of the Anti-authoritarian IWMA, including an important congress of the Jura Federation in September 1880, which was attended by a number of international delegates and observers. It was at this congress that the anarchist movement adopted anarchist communism as its goal. In addition, anarchists were present at other meetings, such as the Le Havre Congress in 1880, which passed a motion that adopted "libertarian communism as the ultimate objective." However, in the last two decades of the 19th century, anarchists tended towards individualism and autonomy, emphasizing propaganda of the deed and suspicious of federalism as the first step on a slippery slope towards authoritarianism.

- International Social Revolutionary Congress, London, 14–20 July 1881.
- International Anarchist Congress, Chicago, 1893, to coincide with the World's Fair
- International Anarchist Congress, Paris, scheduled for September 1900, affected by the July assassination of Umberto I but met in secret. It was unsuccessful at setting up a formal anarchist organization.
- International Anarchist Congress of Amsterdam, 26–31 August 1907
- London Anarchist Congress, 28 August – 5 September 1914
- European Anarchist Congress, Paris, 15–17 May 1948

== See also ==
- 1881 Chicago Social Revolutionary Congress
- 1898 International Conference of Rome for the Social Defense Against Anarchists

== Bibliography ==
- Bantman, Constance (April 5, 2013). The French Anarchists in London, 1880-1914: Exile and Transnationalism in the First Globalisation. Oxford University Press. ISBN 978-1-78138-658-3.
- Zimmer, Kenyon (2015). Immigrants Against the State: Yiddish and Italian Anarchism in America. University of Illinois Press. ISBN 978-0-252-09743-0. OCLC 919484664.
