= Hermann Jung =

Swiss socialist (1830–1901)

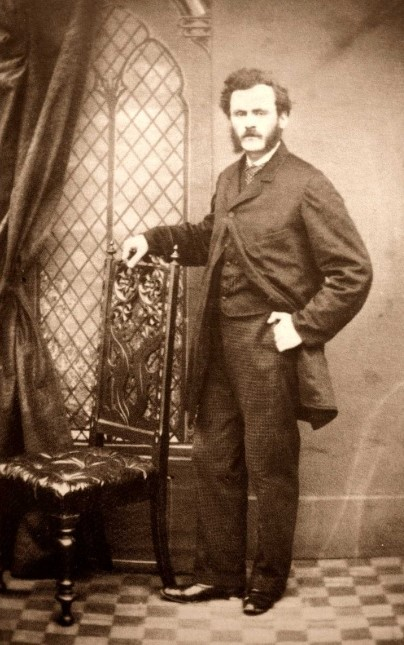
Hermann Jung, 1880

Hermann Jung (1830, St. Imier – 3.9.1901, London) was a Swiss watchmaker who was active as a socialist in the International Workingmen's Association IWA. Jung participated in the revolution of 1848/49 in Germany and then emigrated to London. Here he became involved with the IWA. He was corresponding secretary for Switzerland in 1864–1872. He presided over the congresses of the IWA held in Geneva, Brussels, Basle and London. He was a member of the British Federal Council. Originally he followed of Marx, but after 1872 he joined the British Federal Council and the leaders of the British trade unions in opposing centralisation. He was not involved in the labour movement after 1877.
