= Émile Aubry =

Émile Aubry may refer to:

- Émile Aubry (printer) (1829–1900), French printer and labour activist
- Émile Aubry (painter) (1880–1964), French artist

== See also ==
- Emilie Aubry (born 1989), Swiss cyclist
