= Jean-Claude Creusot =

Jean-Claude Creusot (born 24 May 1826, Ferdrupt) was a French cotton spinner active in the workers' movement in Rouen.

Jeaqn Claude was the son of André Cresot, a day labourer and Marie Rose Perron. He married Zoé Henriette Peltier in Rouen on 23 February 1852. They had a daughter, Marie Henriette Creusot, who also became a spinner.

Creusot was active in the International Workingmen's Association and attended the Basle Congress (1869) as a delegate of the Federation. On 31 August 1870 he was sentenced to 3 months in prison for participating in an unauthorised organisation of over 20 people, but was then given an amnesty when the French Third Republic was declared a few days later on 4 September. He then joined the Comité de Vigilance.

He was active in the Federation of Rouen Workers and on 24 April 1871 joined them in issuing a manifesto supporting the Paris Commune. He was arrested the next day for this. However it was never established whether he had done so. Later he retired to Saint-Amé, Vosges.
