= Eugène Pieton =

Eugène Pieton (31 December 1837, Le Neubourg – 18 November 1904, Elbeuf) was a weaver and a Labour Court advisor in Elbeuf who was active in the workers' movement.

In 1869 he joined and soon became a leading figure in the Federation of Rouen Workers (French: Fédération ouvriere rouenaise), the local branch of the International Workingmen's Association. In 1869 he was a delegate to the Basle Congress of the IWA.

Following the defeat of the Paris Commune several of the leading figures in the worker movement around Rouen went into exile. However Pieton organised a meeting of weavers in Elbeuf which led to the formation of a corporation of weavers.
