= Adhémar Schwitzguébel =

Swiss anarchist (1844–1895)

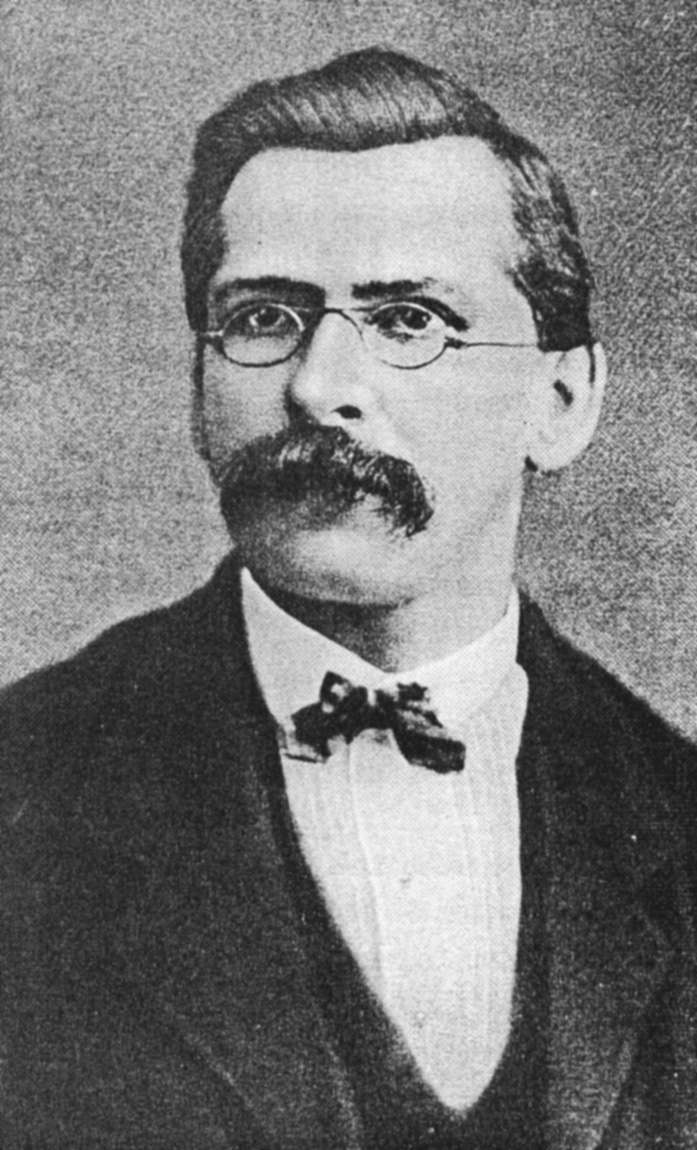
- Adhémar Schwitzguébel (1875)
- Born: 15 August 1844; Sonvilier, Bern, Switzerland
- Died: 23 July 1895 (aged 50); Evilard, Bern, Switzerland
- Occupations: Engraver, watchmaker
- Years active: 1866–1895
- Era: Second Industrial Revolution
- Organizations: International Workingmen's Association (1866–1872); Anti-Authoritarian International (1872–1877)
- Other political affiliations: International Alliance of Socialist Democracy (1868–1869); Jura Federation (1869–1880)
- Movement: Libertarian socialism; Trade unionism

Adhémar Schwitzguébel (1844–1895) was a Swiss anarchist and trade unionist. Associated with the libertarian socialist faction of the International Workingmen's Association (IWA), he co-founded its Jura Federation and participated in the splinter organisation that became the Anti-Authoritarian International. Schwitzguébel became active in the establishment of workers' organisations in Switzerland, establishing the first trade union of watchmakers in the country before his death from stomach cancer.

== Biography ==
Adhémar Schwitzguébel was born in Sonvilier, in the Bernese Jura, on 15 August 1844. He was the son of Auguste Schwitzguébel and Rosalie Pécaut. His father was a liberal activist and owner of an engraving workshop, which Schwitzguébel worked in as an apprentice.

When the International Workingmen's Association (IWA) was established, Schwitzguébel founded the organisation's section in Sonvilier and represented it at the Geneva Congress of 1866. In 1869, he established the IWA's Romandy federation and was delegate to its Basel Congress. He also became a key opponent to the influence of the "bourgeois socialist" Pierre Coullery in the Romandy federation.

Along with fellow Swiss internationalists James Guillaume and Auguste Spichiger, Schwitzguébel became a supporter of Mikhail Bakunin's libertarian socialism and began to champion his collectivist programme for a free association of producers. Together they joined Bakunin's International Alliance of Socialist Democracy and founded the Jura Federation, in order to counter the influence of reformism within the wider Romandy federation. After the suppression of the Paris Commune, Schwitzguébel travelled to the French capital and provided Communards with fake passports to aid their escape to Switzerland.

Schwitzguébel served as a delegate in every IWA congress until the Hague Congress of 1872, when Bakunin and Guillaume were expelled from the organisation. He then participated in the St. Imier Congress, which established the Anti-Authoritarian International. He remained active as one of the main leaders and theoreticians of the Jura Federation, editing its bulletin. At the Jura Federation's final congress in 1880, while he continued to uphold a programme for establishing an anarchist society, he also began to argue for the formation of a socialist political party to participate in elections.

During this time, he had married Catherine Marguerite Miellet, with whom he had eight children. By 1879, Schwitzguébel's father had died and his family fell into poverty. Having already taken over management of the engraving workshop, Schwitzguébel was forced to close it in 1889. While looking for work, he moved to Bienne, where he became an assistant to the Swiss Workers' Secretariat in 1891. There he also established a number of workers' organisations, including the country's first trade union for watchmakers.

He died from stomach cancer, in Evilard, in the Bienne district of the canton of Bern, on 23 July 1895. His trade unionist activities were continued by his son, Adhémar junior, until his own death in 1947.

== Works ==
- Schwitzguébel, Adhemar:Quelques écrits. Paris 1906th Edited by James Guillaume. (fr. edition of 1908)

== See also ==
- Anarchism in Switzerland

== Bibliography ==
- Enckell, Marianne (7 April 2014). "SCHWITZGUEBEL Adhémar". Dictionnaire des anarchistes (in French). Le Maitron.
- Kohler, François (17 March 2011). "Schwitzguébel, Adhémar". Historical Dictionary of Switzerland (in French).
