= Lausanne Congress (1867) =

2nd Congress of the International Workingmen's Association (IWA)

The Lausanne Congress of 1867 was the 2nd General Congress of the International Workingmen's Association (IWA). The meeting was held in the city of Lausanne, Switzerland from 2 to 8 September 1867. It was attended by 71 delegates, representing the socialist and trade union movements of Switzerland, France, Germany, Great Britain, Italy, and Belgium.

== History ==
=== Background ===
The International Workingmen's Association (IWA), commonly known as the First International, was an international association of trade unionist and socialist political activists which attempted to coordinate labour activities across national boundaries. The organisation is remembered for the active participation of many pioneer leaders of the modern socialist and anarchist movements, including Karl Marx and Mikhail Bakunin. Membership in the IWA was numerically small, its funding inadequate, and its institutional life short — lasting a mere 8 years from its establishment in 1864 until its termination at the Hague Congress of 1872.

Establishment of the IWA was related to ongoing efforts to coordinate the activities of the trade union movements in Great Britain and France, a project begun in connection with the 1862 London World's Fair. Economic crisis had led the imperial French government to concede the right to French workers to elect a delegation of 750 to the London exhibition. While in London certain members of this delegation headed by Henri Tolain (1828-1897) established contact with British trade union leaders and opened the door for a formal meeting in London the following summer in support of the Polish uprising of 1863.

The IWA first met in international session in the Swiss city of Geneva in September 1866 in an event remembered to history as the Geneva Congress.

=== Convocation ===
The Lausannne Congress was called to order on 2 September 1867 in Lausanne, Switzerland. There were 71 delegates in attendance, of whom the majority (38) were affiliated with the local Swiss labour movement. Also in attendance were 18 representatives of the French labour movement, including Tolain and Karl Marx's future son-in-law Charles Longuet; 6 German delegates, including medical doctor Louis Kugelmann and philosopher Ludwig Büchner; 2 delegates each from Great Britain and Italy, and one from Belgium. In addition there were in attendance four members of the General Council of the IWA, headed by Johann Eccarius.

Each delegate held one equal vote, regardless of the number of mandates of support he had received. Many of those participating derived their basic political ideas from the writings of French mutualist Pierre-Joseph Proudhon.

=== Decisions ===
The gathering dealt with the organisational structure of the IWA and approved a uniform rate of dues of one English penny per capita, to be paid quarterly to the General Council in London. It was decided that the General Council would in turn be obligated to issue reports on a quarterly basis to the central committees of its affiliated national organisations.

The Congress debated the issue of national banks and the investment of trade union funds, ultimately approving a resolution made by Eccarius urging members of the IWA to work to "induce the trade unions to devote their funds to cooperative production" rather than tying up the same assets in bank accounts.

Also considered by the congress was the matter of education, opining in favour of the standard of free, compulsory, secular education.

The IWA, an international association of trade unionists from its creation, moved towards socialist advocacy at the Lausanne Congress, adopting a resolution calling for state ownership of transportation and exchange in order to break the hold of large companies on these institutions. This represented the first time that the organisation had formally supported the principle of collective ownership.
