= Andrew Cameron (labor leader) =

Andrew Cameron (1834–1892) was an American trade unionist and newspaper editor who founded the National Labor Union alongside William H. Sylvis. He represented the National Labor Union as a delegate to the Basle Congress (1869) of the International Workingmen's Association (IWA).

== Career ==
Cameron worked as a printer at the Chicago Times in 1860. When the paper's publisher, William F. Storey, dismissed his employees to hire cheaper labor, Cameron led a strike, which led to the striking workers forming their own labor newspaper, the Workingman's Advocate. Cameron became editor of this paper.

Cameron was a supporter of free labor republicanism and opposed socialism. Despite this relatively conservative view, he was a supporter of industrial unionism.
