= Frederick Lessner =

German tailor and activist

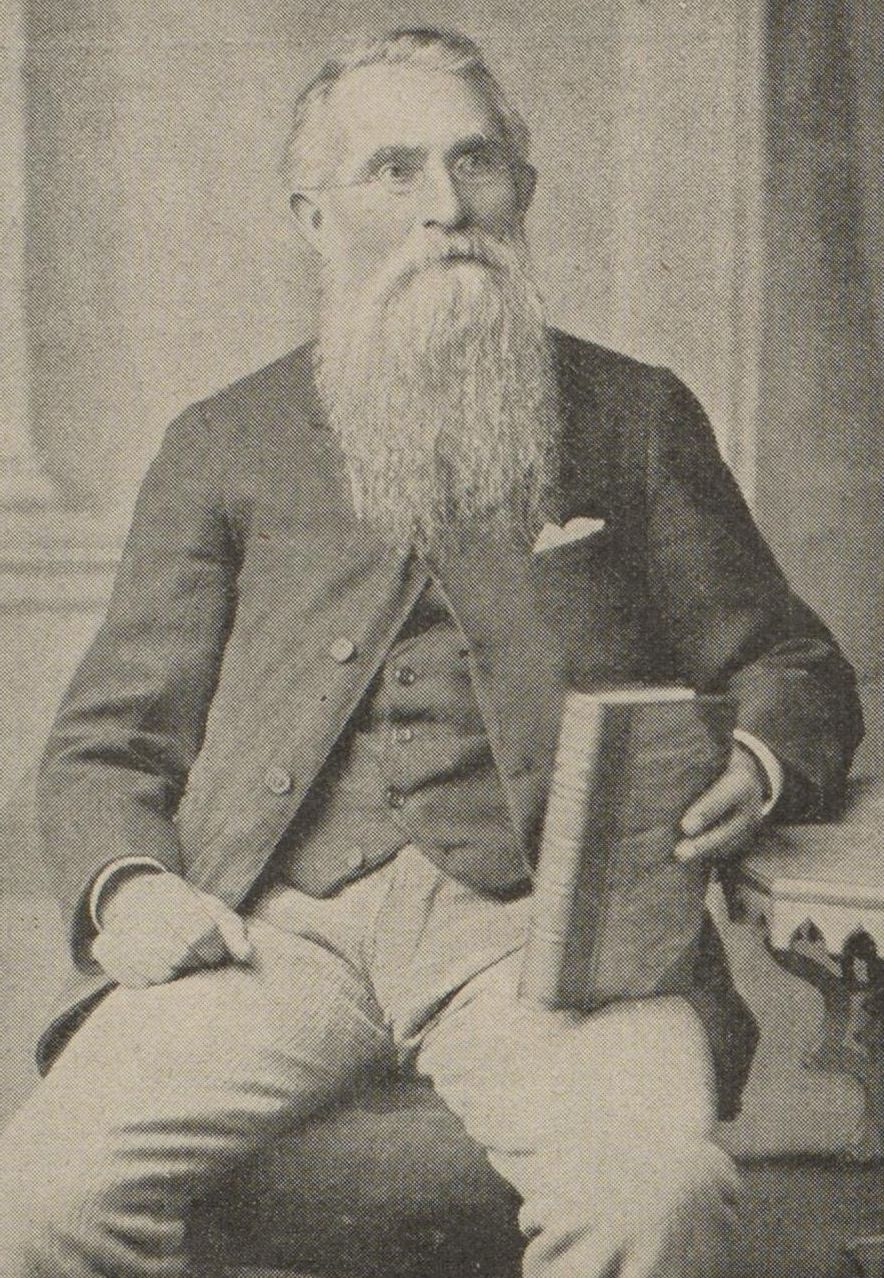
Portrait photo of Frederick Lessner published in Der Wahre Jacob

Fredrick Christian Eduard Lessner (1825–1910) was a German tailor active in the nineteenth century Communist movement. He was a member of the Communist League and participated in the 1848 Revolution. In 1852 he was a defendant in the Cologne Communist Trial.

In 1856 he emigrated to England where he later became a member of the General Council of the International Workingmen's Association in 1864 as a close supporter of Karl Marx. He remained a member until 1872.

In the 1880s and 1890s he was particularly active in the English labour movement and was one of the co-founders of the Independent Labour Party. During the revisionism dispute within the German Social Democratic Party, he sided with orthodox Marxism and rejected the ideas of Eduard Bernstein. In the German Social Democrats he became a symbol of the "old guard" of the movement from around the 1890s. The party financially supported Lessner, who lived his entire life mainly from his meager income as a tailor. In the last years of his later he attended several social democratic party conferences or congresses of the Second International as a guest of honour.
