= Émile Aubry (printer) =

French printer (1829–1900)

Émile Aubry (8 April 1829, Rouen – 23 February 1900, Ivry-sur-Seine) was a French printer active in the workers' movement in Rouen. He was corresponding secretary of the Federation of Rouen Workers, the local branch of the International Workingmen's Association (IWA). In 1869 he was a delegate to the Basel Congress of the IWA.
