= Luigi Wolff =

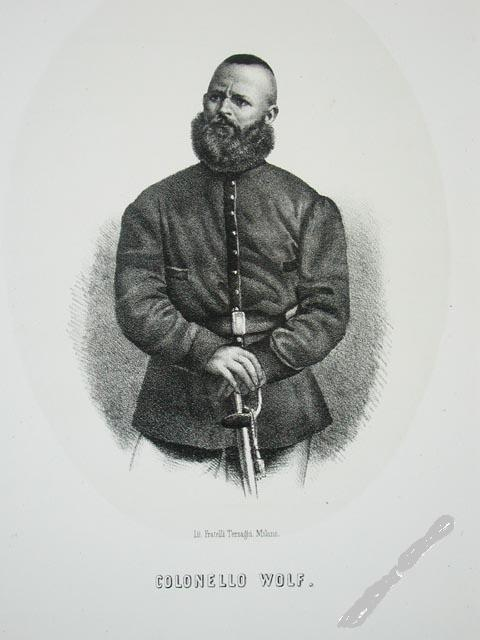
Adolfo Luigi Wolff in 1861.

Luigi Wolff, also known as Louis Wolff or Adolfo Wolff, was an Italian revolutionary of German birth and Jewish ancestry.

== Life ==
Adolfo Luigi Wolff was born in Augsburg, the son of Ludwig Alexander Wolff and Apollonia von Megenauer. The precise dates of his birth and death are uncertain, but he was probably alive between 1810 and 1875. In the 1830s, he joined the French Foreign Legion and fought with distinction in the French conquest of Algeria (1830–47). Before 1849, he served in the Papal army. In 1848–1849, he participated in the Italian Revolution, and in 1856, he fought in the Crimean War as part of an Anglo-Italian contingent. During his adventurous youth, Wolff became a partisan of the Italian Risorgimento and a champion of Italian unification. In addition to nationalist and democratic ideas, he was influenced by utopian socialist doctrines. He became an associate of Giuseppe Mazzini and served as Mazzini's secretary from 1860 to 1870. In 1860–1862, Wolff fought with Giuseppe Garibaldi's troops in several campaigns. When he was not away fighting somewhere, Wolff usually resided in London. In the early 1860s, he helped organise an association of Italian workers in London. In 1864, at Mazzini's suggestion, Wolff served as one of the Italian delegates to the newly founded First International. In 1864–1865, he served on its General Council. He was involved in drafting the International's rules and statutes, much to the dismay of Karl Marx, who deplored Mazzini's influence. (Marx eventually wrote the rules adopted by the International.) In 1865, Wolff withdrew from the General Council of the International. In 1865, he was imprisoned in Alexandria. In 1866, he volunteered once again for Garibaldi's forces and fought in the third Italian war of independence. He fought in the battle of Ponte Caffaro on 25 June and in the battle of Monte Suello on 3 July 1866. Wolff attained the rank of colonel and was given the medal of valour after Italy achieved her independence. However, in 1871, after the fall of the Second French Empire, documents found in Paris apparently proved that Wolff had been a paid informer of the imperial police of Napoléon III. This damaged Wolff's reputation among Italian nationalists, who never forgave Napoléon III for his attack on the Roman revolutionaries in 1849, and among socialists and trade unionists, who remembered the persecution of their French comrades. Wolff disappeared after this and was not heard from again.

== Sources ==
- Marx, K., 'On Mazzini’s Attitude to The International Working Men’s Association.' Marx-Engels Collected Works, Volume 20, p. 401.
- Marx-Engels Gesamtausgabe. - Werke, Artikel, Entwürfe, September 1864-September 1867. Berlin, 2003, p. 390 f. and p. 453 ff.
- Ferino, U.Z., La Campagna Garibaldina dall’Adda al Garda. Trento 1966.
- King, B., The Life of Mazzini. London, 1902.
- King, H. (ed.), Letters and Recollections of Mazzini. New York, 1912.
