= Eugène Varlin =

French socialist (1839–1871)

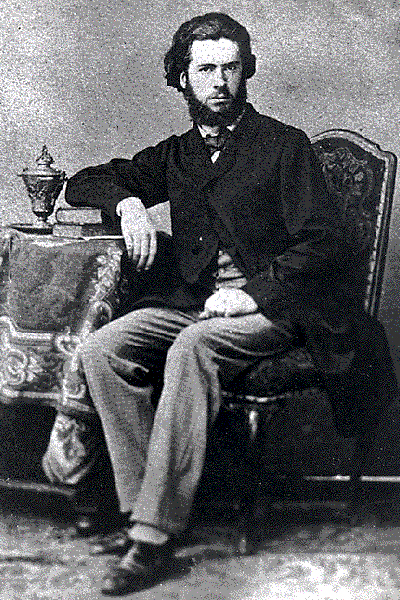
- Born: Louis-Eugène Varlin; 5 October 1839; Claye-Souilly, France
- Died: 28 May 1871 (aged 31); Montmartre
- Occupations: Bookbinder; revolutionary; union organizer

Eugène Varlin (French pronunciation: [øʒɛn vaʁlɛ̃]; 5 October 1839 – 28 May 1871) was a French socialist, anarchist, communard and member of the First International. He was one of the pioneers of French syndicalism.

== Biography ==
=== Early life and activism ===
Louis-Eugène Varlin was born at Claye-Souilly (Seine-et-Marne), into a poor peasant family. Apprenticed as a painter, he moved to Paris and became a bookbinder by profession. As a young man he read the writings of the anarchist social critic Pierre-Joseph Proudhon, which greatly influenced him. In 1857, Varlin participated in founding a bookbinders' mutual aid society, which became the nucleus of a bookbinders' trade union. Varlin was one of the principal organisers of the very first strike of the Parisian bookbinders in 1864. The strike was a success, so in 1865, the bookbinders repeated the exercise; this time the results were less encouraging. Varlin also founded the bookbinders' mutual savings and credit association, organised along Proudhonist lines. As a firm believer in the equality of the sexes, he promoted the anarchist and feminist Nathalie Lemel (1827–1921) to a leading position in the bank.

Varlin led the bookbinders' union into the International Working Men's Association (the First International), founded in 1864. He was a delegate to the London congress of the International in 1865, to the Geneva congress in 1866, along with Lemel, and to the Basel congress in 1869. He was a defendant in the second and third trials of the French section of the International in 1869 and 1870. In the controversy between Proudhonists and Marxists in the International, Varlin took the side of the Proudhonists. He became a close friend and associate of leading Proudhonists, such as Henri Tolain and Benoît Malon. Varlin believed that the nascent trade unions should overcome their professional, local and national particularism and form a united international labour movement, dedicated, as the statutes of his bookbinders' union put it, "to the constant improvement of the conditions of existence of ... the workers of all professions and all countries, and to [bringing] workers into possession of the instruments of their labour." On 14 November 1869 Varlin helped found the Parisian Federation of Workers' Associations, a confederation of trade unions that became the nucleus of the General Confederation of Labour (CGT), the main organisation of the syndicalist movement.

Varlin was also active in a number of other projects. In 1867 he helped found a co-operative called La Ménagère. In 1868 he co-founded La Marmite, a co-operative restaurant, which remained in business until after the Paris Commune. He was involved in numerous strikes and helped organise branches of the First International at Lyon, Creusot and Lille. Trade unions were not fully legal, and the International was treated as a dangerous conspiracy, so Varlin was arrested numerous times. In 1870, he helped organise protests against the impending war between France and Prussia and co-authored the anti-war manifesto of the Parisian section of the International. In 1870 Varlin briefly fled to Belgium, fearing political persecution. He returned to Paris after the revolution of 4 September, which overthrew Napoléon III. Although he had opposed the war, Varlin participated in the defence of Paris. He became commander of the 193rd battalion of the National Guard in Paris.

=== The Franco-Prussian War and the Paris Commune ===
The Franco-Prussian War went badly for Napoléon III; the Emperor was captured by the Germans and his government fell. Varlin became a member of the Republican Central Committee in Paris. He also became a member of the Central Committee of the National Guard. Varlin's involvement in the premature insurrection of 31 October 1870 caused the government of Adolphe Thiers to revoke his command. Varlin also participated in the uprising on 22 January. During the siege of Paris by the Prussians, Varlin devoted himself to organising relief for the population; his care packages became known as 'Varlin's marmites' (named after his co-operative restaurant). Varlin also became secretary for the French section of the First International. In February 1871, Varlin ran unsuccessfully as a Socialist-Revolutionary candidate in the elections to the National Assembly of France.

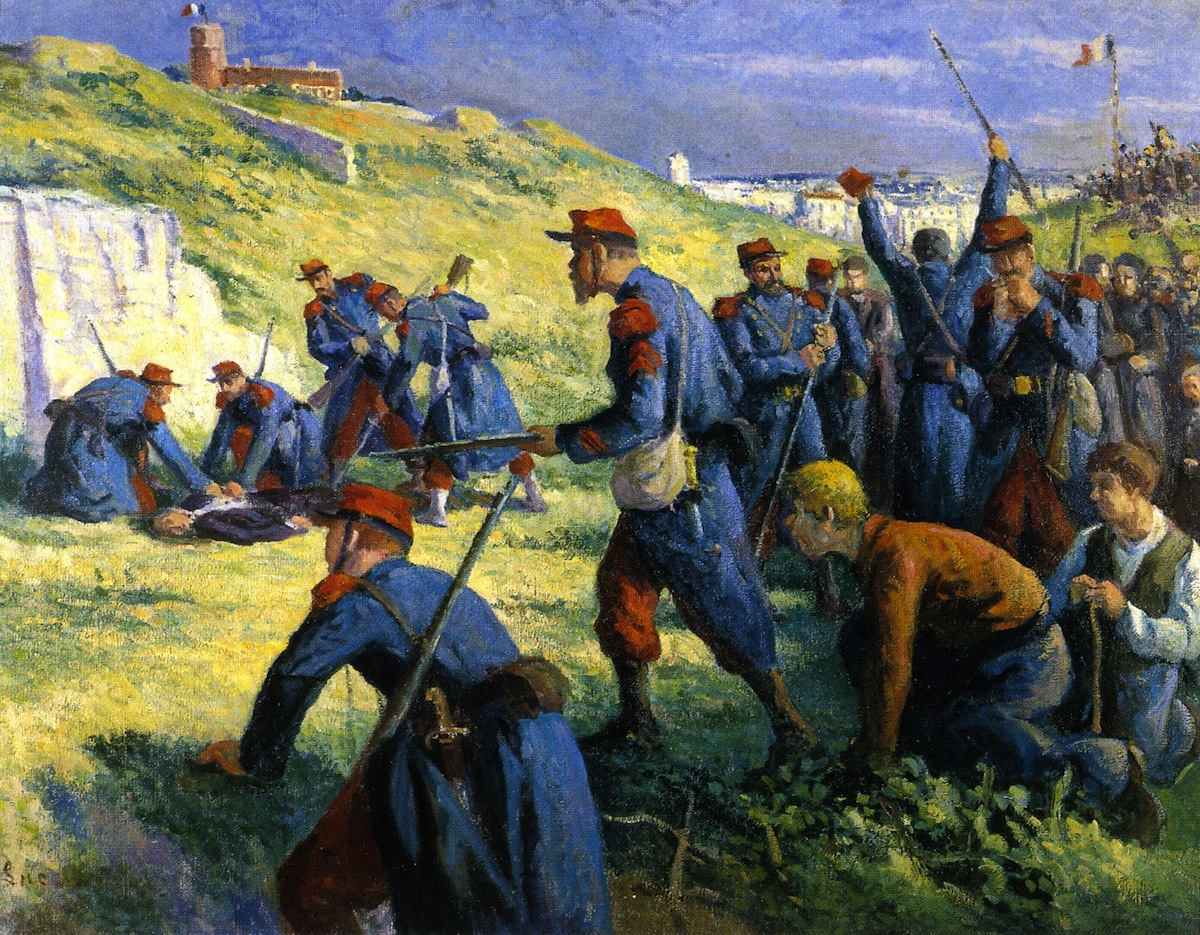
The Execution of Varlin by Maximilien Luce.

On 18 March 1871 Varlin participated in storming the Place Vendôme. He was one of the authors of the Manifesto of the Parisian section of the International on 24 March. On 26 March he was elected by a landslide to the Council of the Paris Commune, representing the sixth, twelfth and seventeenth arrondissements (districts). He became the Commune's commissioner of finance and was the Commune's point man on labour relations. Among the various political factions which participated in the Paris Commune, Varlin sided with the Proudhonists, belonging to the left wing of that group. However, his tireless energy and idealism made him a popular figure in many quarters. On 1 May Varlin sided with the minority which voted against creating a 'Committee of Public Safety', modelled on that of the French Revolution. On 5 May he became a member of the Commune's war commission. During the 'Bloody Week' he tried in vain to save the lives of several hostages shot by the Communards. Varlin participated actively in the fighting against the troops of the Versailles government and was in charge of the defence of the sixth and eleventh arrondissements. When the Commune was suppressed, Varlin was captured, and taken to Montmartre, where, with other prisoners, he was shot.

Several streets and schools in Paris, Brest and Lyon bear Eugène Varlin's name.

== Sources ==
- Varlin, E., and P. Lejeune (ed)., Pratique militante & écrits d'un ouvrier communard. Maspero, 1977.
- Noël, B. (ed.), Dictionnaire de la Commune. Flammarion, 1978.
- Bruhat, J., Eugène Varlin: Militant ouvrier, révolutionnaire et communard. Paris, 1975.
- Cordillot, M., Eugène Varlin: Chronique d'un espoir assassiné. Editions de l'Atelier, 1991.
- Shafer, D.A., The Paris Commune: French politics, Culture, and Society at the Crossroads of the Revolutionary Tradition and Revolutionary Socialism. Palgrave Macmillan, 2005.
- The Great Soviet Encyclopedia. Moscow, 1979.
- http://periodicos.uem.br/ojs/index.php/EspacoAcademico/article/view/12645/6701
- http://www.revistas.ufg.br/index.php/historia/article/view/18143
