= Moritz Rittinghausen =

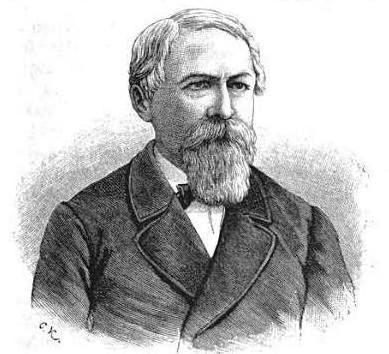
- Moritz Rittinghausen
- Born: November 10, 1814; Hückeswagen
- Died: December 29, 1890 (aged 76); Ath, Belgium
- Occupation(s): German political theorist and politician
- Known for: theorist of direct democracy, founding member of Social Democratic Workers' Party of Germany

Moritz Rittinghausen (November 10, 1814, in Hückeswagen – December 29, 1890, in Ath, Belgium) was a German advocate and theorist of direct democracy, an early socialist and a politician.

Rittinghausen lived in Belgium temporarily during the period before the March Revolution and emerged there as a leading thinker on social politics. He took an active part in the German revolutions of 1848–49 as a democrat. After leaving the country during the Reaction following the Revolution, he later returned to Germany and began to take a role in the labor movement. He was among the founders of the Social Democratic Workers' Party of Germany, before he was thrown out of the party over political differences.

== Early life and pre-Revolutionary Period ==
He was born into an influential family in Hückeswagen, in the Rhineland. His grandfather already had been mayor; his grandmother was descended from the old, originally French de Blois family. His father also served as mayor and as a court official Hückeswagen. Moritz Rittinghausen attended Gymnasium; sources offer different details about his early life. According to Wilhelm Heinz Schröder, after his graduation he was a merchant in Köln. According to Fäuster he studied legal science and lived in Belgium. There he already appeared as a thinker and activist in social politics; in 1837, he composed an open letter to the King, in which he denounced the social problem in the country. After his release he returned to Germany.

From the 1840s on, he emerged as a writer on politics and national economy, representing socialist ideas. Beginning in 1846, he lived in Köln. In September 1847, he took part in a free trade congress in Brussels, acting as a defender of the protective tariff. Friedrich Engels criticized him in a newspaper article as a "German Protectionist" and "generally an insipid fellow."

By 1848 Rittinghausen was a contributor to several different newspapers, such as the Kölnischen Zeitung, the Aachener Zeitung, the Trierer Zeitung and the Kölner Gewerbeblatt.

== German Revolutions of 1848-49 ==
In 1848 Rittinghausen was a member of the Vorparlament in Frankfurt, where he belonged to the Left wing. He agreed with Friedrich Hecker's proposal that the Vorparlament should remain in place until the meeting of an actual National Assembly. Instead, the liberal majority came to favor the formation of the Committee of Fifty (Fünfzigerausschuss). Rittinghausen also belonged to this committee.

In Köln Rittinghausen belonged to the Democratic Society (Demokratische Gesellschaft), which developed into an influential political group in the city. Most of the leading figures came from the educated bourgeoisie or Bildungsbürgertum class. Members of the Communist League, such as Karl Marx und Friedrich Engels, also took part.

During the German revolutions of 1848–49 he was a contributor to the Neue Rheinische Zeitung, which brought him into closer contact with Marx. By his own statements, Rittinghausen sometimes supported and sometimes fought Marx's efforts, depending on whether he took them to be reasonable or misguided. Usually the latter was the case. On at least one occasion, he attempted to save Marx from deportation.

In Spring 1848, he involved himself in the development of a Democratic Society election platform for the Frankfurt Parliament elections. He also took part in drafting addresses to the King and the government. Later he wrote a petition to the Parliament on the nationality policy. In the same year he also published the work Über die Organisation der Staatsindustrie (On the Organization of State Industry), in which he promoted, among other things, the nationalization of railroads.

In 1849, he was co-editor of the Westdeutschen Zeitung in Köln, until it had to cease publication as a result of the triumphant Counter-Revolution. After the defeat of the Revolution, Rittinghausen emigrated next to Paris. In the wake of Napoleon III's later coup d'état, Rittinghausen moved to Brussels, where he continued to work as a journalist.

== Politician in the Labor Movement ==
Rittinghausen returned in 1858 after the beginning of the New Era, and lived as an author in Köln, where he cofounded the democratic Political-Social Club (Politisch-Geselligen Vereins).

Rittinghausen observed the developing labor movement with sympathy, but he rejected the centralist organization of the General German Workers' Association. He occasionally gave talks in the party. In 1867, he ran, unsuccessfully, as a candidate for the Reichstag of the North German Confederation. At the beginning of 1868, together with adherents of the First International, he founded a social-democratic electoral club, and in 1869 became one of the co-founders of the Social Democratic Workers' Party of Germany (SDAP).

Besides this, he concerned himself with municipal affairs for the city of Köln. He demanded the abolition of census suffrage and petitioned for the incorporation of the town of Deutz, and succeeded in collecting over a thousand signatures in favor. Later, he campaigned for the purchase of Köln's city fortifications from the military administration, with the support of delegates from other political parties.

In 1869 and 1872 he served as a German delegate to the congresses of the First International in Basel and The Hague. Due to his knowledge of languages he also acted as an interpreter in Basel. During the congress in Basel, he took part in an arbitration committee that attempted to mediate a conflict between Mikhail Bakunin and Wilhelm Liebknecht.

== Writing ==
- Über die Organisation der Staatsindustrie. Bachem, Köln 1848.
- Die direkte Gesetzgebung durch das Volk. Paris 1850.
- La législation directe par le peuple ou la véritable démocratie. Librairie Phalanstérienne, Paris 1851 Digitalisat bei: books.google.de.
- La législation directe par le peuple et ses adversaires. Lebégue, Bruxelles 1852 Bayerische Staatsbibliothek digital.
- Le système protecteur et le libre échange devant le Congrès des Économistes de 1847. Bruxelles 1856 (Aus: Revue Trimestrielle, Vol. XII).
- Die Philosophie der Geschichte. Selbstverlag, Köln 1868 (Social-demokratische Abhandlungen, Heft 1).
- Ueber die Nothwendigkeit der direkten Gesetzgebung durch das Volk. Selbstverlag, Köln 1869 (Social-demokratische Abhandlungen, Heft 2).
- Die unhaltbaren Grundlagen des Repräsentativ-Systems. Selbstverlag, Köln 1869 (Social-demokratische Abhandlungen, Heft 3) Bayerische Staatsbibliothek digital.
- Ueber die Organisation der direkten Gesetzgebung durch das Volk. Selbstverlag, Köln 1870 (Social-demokratische Abhandlungen, Heft 4) Bayerische Staatsbibliothek digital.
- Widerlegung der gegen die direkte Gesetzgebung durch das Volk gerichteten Einwürfe. Selbstverlag, Köln 1872 (Social-demokratische Abhandlungen, Heft 5).
- Die Festungswerke communalen Ursprungs der ehemaligen Freien Reichsstadt Köln. Eine Eigenthumsfrage. Selbstverlag, Köln 1877.
- Die direkte Gesetzgebung durch das Volk. 4. Aufl., Selbstverlag, Köln 1877.
- La législation directe par le peuple et ses adversaires. Nouv. éd., augm. d’une notice biographique . Lebègue, Bruxelles 1892.
- Die direkte Gesetzgebung durch das Volk. 5. Aufl. Kommissionsverlag der Buchhandlung des Schweiz. Grütlivereins, Zürich 1893.
