= Federation of Rouen Workers =

Rouen workers

The Federation of Rouen Workers was set up in 1866 as a local branch of the International Workingmen's Association. Émile Aubry, a local printer, was the corresponding secretary.
