= National Labor Union =

American trade union, defunct since 1873

- Abbreviation: NLU
- Successor: Greenback Labor Party
- Dissolved: February 22, 1878
- Location: United States
- Key people: William H. Sylvis; Andrew Cameron

The National Labor Union (NLU) was the first national labor federation in the United States. Founded in 1866 and defunct in 1873, the NLU paved the way for other organizations, such as the Knights of Labor and the AFL (American Federation of Labor). In 1870, the NLU created the National Labor Reform Party (NLRP), also Labor Reform Party (LRP), which continued until 1878, when it merged into the Greenback Party.

The NLU was led by William H. Sylvis and Andrew Cameron.

== Ideology ==
The NLU drew much of its support from construction unions and other groups of skilled employees but also invited the unskilled and farmers to join. On the other hand, it campaigned for the exclusion of Chinese workers from the United States and made only halting, ineffective efforts to defend the rights of women and Black people. African-American workers established their own Colored National Labor Union as an adjunct, but their support of the prevalent racism of the citizens of the United States limited its effectiveness.

== Membership ==
In early 1869, the Chicago Tribune boasted that the NLU had 800,000 members. Sylvis claimed only 600,000 members. Both figures were greatly exaggerated.

== History ==
=== Origins ===
The National Labor Union (NLU) followed the unsuccessful efforts of labor activists to form a national coalition of local trade unions. The NLU sought instead to bring together all of the national labor organizations in existence, as well as the "eight-hour leagues" established to press for the eight-hour day, to create a national federation that could press for labor reforms and help found national unions in those areas where none existed. The new organization favored arbitration over strikes and called for the creation of a national labor party as an alternative to the two existing parties.

=== Early history ===
The NLU achieved early success, but one that proved less significant in practice. In 1868, Congress passed the statute for which the Union had campaigned so hard, providing the eight-hour day for government workers. Many government agencies, however, reduced wages at the same time that they reduced hours. While President Grant ordered federal departments not to reduce wages, his order was ignored by many. The NLU also obtained similar legislation in a number of states, such as New York and California, but discovered that loopholes in the statute made them unenforceable or ineffective.

=== Decline and demise ===
The organization was spectacularly unsuccessful at the polls and lost virtually all of its union supporters, many of whom moved on to the newly formed Knights of Labor. The depression of the 1870s, which drove down union membership generally, was one of the final factors contributing to the end of the NLU, the other being the dismantling of policies instituted during Radical Reconstruction.

The 1870 NLU Congress created the National Labor Reform Party (NLRP) to pursue its political agenda. As the NLU became increasingly political, most of its trade union members left the organization, in favor of apolitical "pure and simple" trade unionism. As a result, the NLU was increasingly dominated by political and agrarian organizations. In the 1872 United States presidential election, the NLRP nominated David Davis of Illinois, associate justice of the U.S. Supreme Court, as its presidential candidate for the upcoming presidential election. Davis later, however, withdrew his candidacy. The NLRP instead supported the Straight-Out Democratic Party's candidate Charles O'Conor (who declined the nomination). The parties won just 0.33% of the vote, dashing hopes for a labor competitor to the Democratic and Republican parties.

After holding one last convention in 1873, the National Labor Union collapsed and dissolved.

The National Labor Reform Party (NLRP) continued until 1878, when it merged with the Greenback Party.

== See also ==
- Labor federation competition in the U.S.
- International Workingmen's Association in America
- Greenback Labor Party
- Eight-Hour Leagues
