= Sonvilier Circular =

1871 treatise on anti-authoritarianism

The Sonvilier Circular is an 1871 anti-authoritarian treatise by the Jura Federation, a breakaway faction of the First International. Written during their Sonvilier congress, it claimed that hierarchical politics could not produce social revolution, and that authoritarian organization would never produce an egalitarian society. Rather than form political parties, revolutionary organizations had to model the revolutionary society in miniature.
