= Henri Palix =

French politician

Henri Palix (14 November 1864 – 24 May 1936) was a French politician.

Palix was born in Saint-Julien-en-Saint-Alban. He belonged to the French Workers' Party (POF). He was a member of the Chamber of Deputies from 1898 to 1902.

== Biography ==
A lawyer at the Lyon Court of Appeal, he was a member of the French Workers' Party. He was elected representative of the Rhône in 1898, in the second district of Villefranche-sur-Saône. Sitting with the parliamentary socialist group, he supported Alexandre Millerand's ministerial participation in 1899 and was expelled from the POF in February 1900. Defeated in the 1902 elections, he did not join the socialist unity movement in 1905.
