= Émile Aubry (painter) =

French painter (1880–1964)

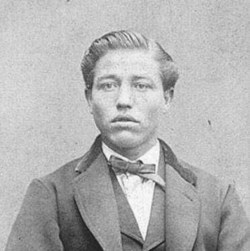
Émile Aubry

Émile Aubry (18 April 1880, Sétif – 9 January 1964, Voutenay-sur-Cure) was a French painter. He remained particularly attached to Algeria the country of his birth.

== Early life ==
His father, Charles-Albert Aubry, came from Franche-Comté and was sent to Setif as Lieutenant in the French Army. However he decided to settle there, where he became a local physician. His mother was born to French parents who had settled there thirty years previously. Émile grew up there with his brother Georges, before attending boarding school in Paris.

In 1935 he was elected to the Académie des Beaux-Arts.
