= Hague Congress (1872) =

5th Congress of the First International

1872 Hague Congress
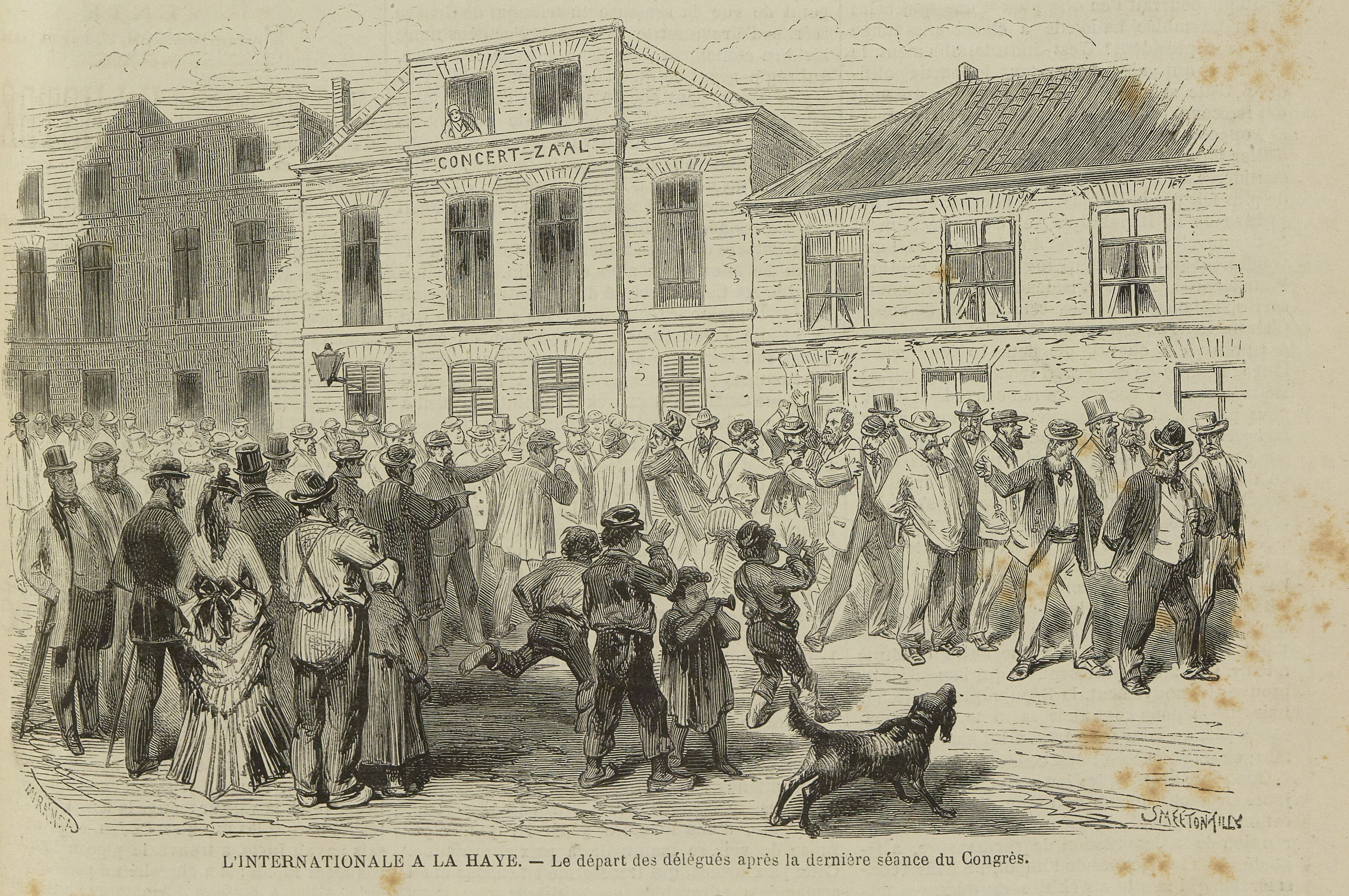
- Delegates booed and insulted by the Dutch crowd at the end of the congress in L'Illustration
- Date: 2–7 September 1872
- Location: The Hague
- Coordinates: 52°05′N 4°19′E
- Participants: 65 delegates
- People: Karl Marx; James Guillaume; Friedrich Engels; Adhémar Schwitzguébel

The Hague Congress, held from 2 to 7 September 1872, in the eponymous city, was a congress of the International Workingmen's Association (IWA), more commonly known as the First International. It is one of the fundamental events in the history of the workers' movement, marking the split between the Marxists and the anti-authoritarians/anarchists, two political movements that separated during this congress.

Following the founding of the International, numerous factions gathered within it, notably the Bakuninists or anti-authoritarians, who brought together anarchists, collectivists, and anti-authoritarian socialists. This group represented the majority of the organization, while the Marxists and Blanquists were allied and controlled the General Council of the IWA. While all these factions started as allies within the organization, personal and theoretical conflicts arose between them, crystallized in the growing opposition between Mikhail Bakunin and Karl Marx. As the Marxists and Blanquists were progressively outpaced by the spreading Bakuninist federations, which threatened their control over the organization, they attempted to strengthen the power of the General Council, which they controlled. This provoked a rupture with a large part of the IWA, especially the Spanish (the largest of all), Italian, Belgian, and Jurassian federations. Marx, supported by the German Marxists and his own forces in London and the United States, then organized the Hague Congress, choosing the location and management to favor his interests and strengthen his positions. Bakunin, unable to travel to the congress as he was being sought by the French and German police, left his 'lieutenant' James Guillaume to represent him.

The Hague Congress resulted in the expulsion of Bakunin and Guillaume from the IWA and the adoption of statutes entrusting decision-making power to the General Council. A majority of the International's federations rejected these decisions and this congress, and decided to meet a week later in Saint-Imier for the Saint-Imier Congress, which founded the Anti-authoritarian International. This new body was perceived as the continuity of the First International and became a fundamental organization in the history of anarchism. For their part, the Marxists sidelined the Blanquists from the organization they still controlled. This action isolated them from the few remaining forces other than their own within their IWA and ultimately led to the organization's disappearance in 1876.

The Anti-authoritarian International disappeared around the 1880s, giving way to other systems of organization, such as anarchist companionship. Meanwhile, the Marxists and Social Democrats founded the Second International in 1889.

== History ==
=== Context ===
==== Founding of the First International and initial conflicts ====
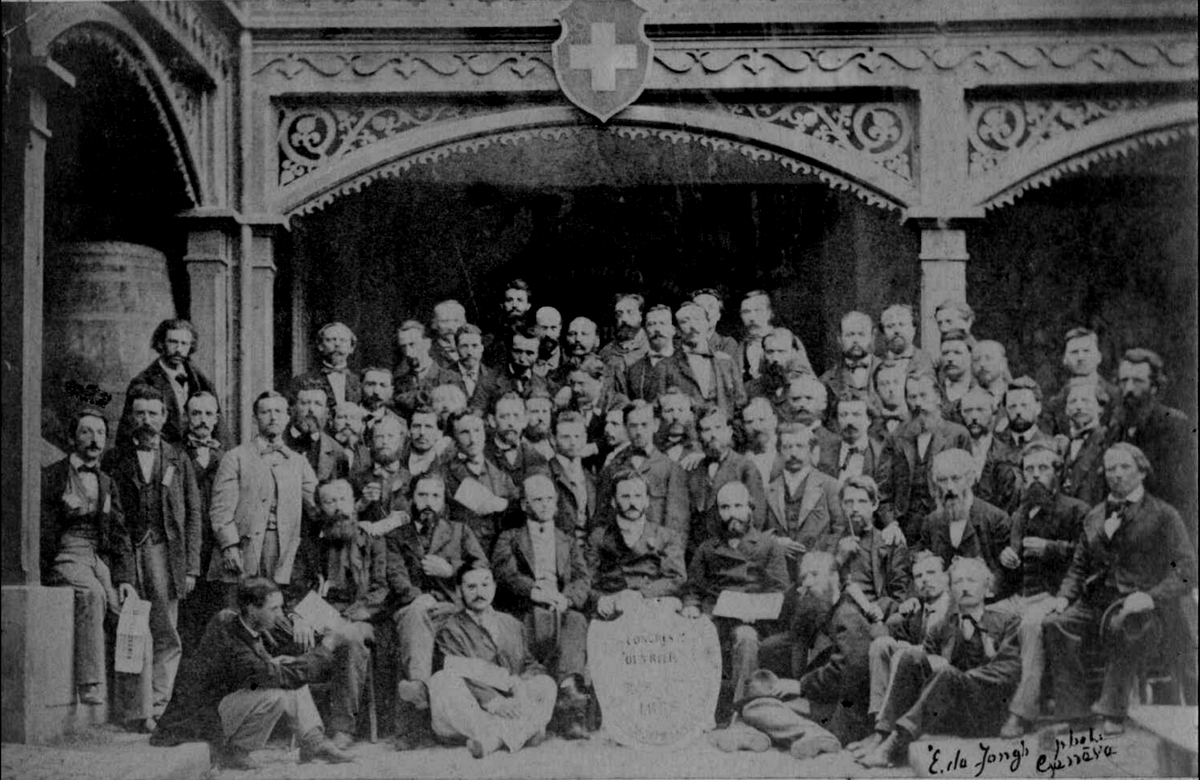
Geneva Congress of the First International, 1866

The International Workingmen's Association (IWA), or the First International, was a workers' association founded in London in 1864. It is a fundamental organization in the history of the workers' movement, quickly bringing together many figures linked to its history, such as Karl Marx, James Guillaume, Friedrich Engels, Errico Malatesta, and Carlo Cafiero. Different political movements were represented, ranging from Marxism to anarchism, as well as more moderate socialists and Proudhonists.

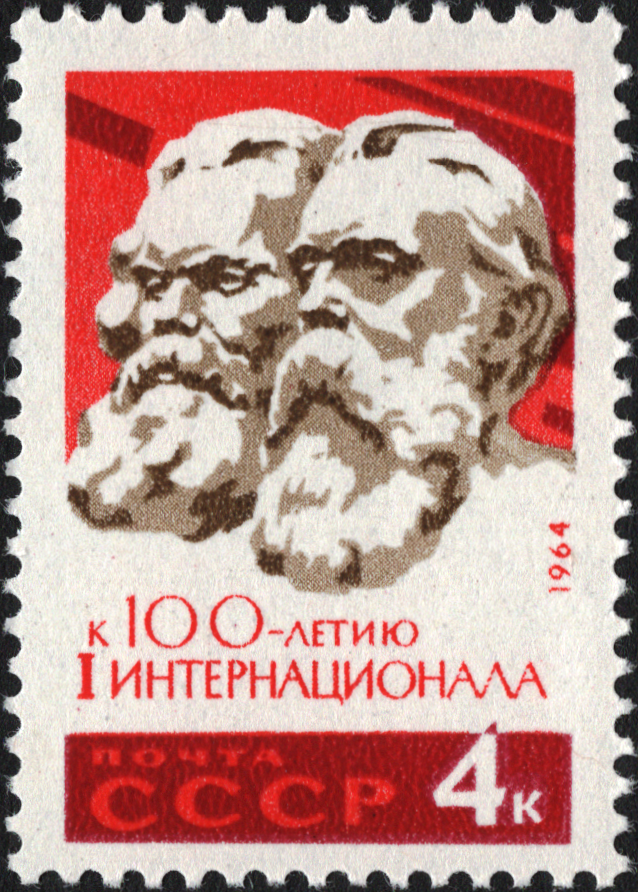
Stamp of the USSR for the centenary of the founding of the International, presenting Marx and Engels as its main founders (1964).

During the congresses held by the organization, central points of anarchism, Marxism, syndicalism, and socialism were debated, and the IWA served as an important theoretical and practical foundation for the birth of the workers' movement. Gradually, two main tendencies emerged within the organization: a Marxist tendency, gathered around Karl Marx and his allies, and an anti-authoritarian, anarchist and collectivist tendency, which also brought together moderate socialists and other groups, and which crystallized around Mikhail Bakunin and his allies, a large part of whom would become the anarchist movement. Bakunin, a Russian revolutionary with prestige in revolutionary groups, joined the IWA in Geneva in 1868 and actively participated in the founding of several groups of the International, such as the Jura Federation.

Initially, these two factions were allied within the IWA. Bakunin sought to have Marx's Das Kapital published in Russia, and Cafiero translated it into Italian, but gradually, theoretical and personal conflicts began to oppose the two groups. Numerous theoretical and practical points separated them: Bakunin believed that criminals, sex workers, prisoners, beggars, and other marginalized groups could be revolutionary forces, while Marx held an 'abysmal scorn' for them, according to historian Hans Gerth. Furthermore, unlike the Marxists, who thought that to achieve communism—where all goods are commonly owned—it would be necessary to retain the State for a certain period, a supposedly transitional phase designated as the dictatorship of the proletariat, Bakunin estimated that this transitional phase was highly problematic and would lead toward dictatorship.

==== The question of the General Council and forces in play ====
These theoretical and personal conflicts devolved into an organizational one: Marx and his allies, such as Engels and his son-in-law, Paul Lafargue, wanted the International to be a centralized organization controlled by the General Council that they dominated. Following a meeting of about twenty people, the London Congress, they managed to have a vote that increased the council's powers. On the other hand, the Bakuninists wished to stick to the organization's initial statutes, which gave strong autonomy to the national or regional federations and made the General Council merely a coordinating body between the different federations. They did not accept the statutory changes desired by Marx and demanded a congress. They viewed this move by Marx as highly problematic, and numerous federations were on the verge of breaking with him and the party he was constituting inside the First International.

These conflicts were amplified by the 'race for membership' that the two movements undertook to gather maximum support in the workers' movement. The Bakuninists managed to establish a very strong foothold in Spain (whose federation adopted explicitly Bakuninist lines), Italy, Switzerland, and France (where the International was banned). Overall, it is estimated that a large majority of the AIT's federations and militants supported Bakunin in his conflict with the General Council constituted by the Marxists, with the Spanish federation alone forming a large part of the organization's membership at this point. The Marxists, meanwhile, primarily had the support of the German Marxists and a few scattered sections in the United States. They also established various new structures, such as a Polish federation in London, which they attempted to pass off as the legitimate and representative federation of Poland. The Marxists, who found themselves outpaced in this 'race for membership', believed that the Bakuninists' success in the areas they coveted—such as Spain, where Marx sent his son-in-law, Lafargue, who quickly became isolated due to the strength of the anarchists in the Spanish federation and failed to achieve success—was due to the Bakuninists, led by Bakunin, having established secret societies intended to combat Marxist influence within the organization.

These accusations were false but were used by the Marxists to try to 'purge' the anarchists from the organization. They were in a situation where they were becoming increasingly isolated from the militant base of the organization and surpassed by the growing influence of the Bakuninists within it. For the Marxists, the goal was to prevent this situation from continuing by seeking to exclude Bakunin and his most visible supporters, to take control of the organization through the General Council they dominated, and thus secure a privileged place within the far-left and the workers' movement.

==== The Rimini breakaway ====
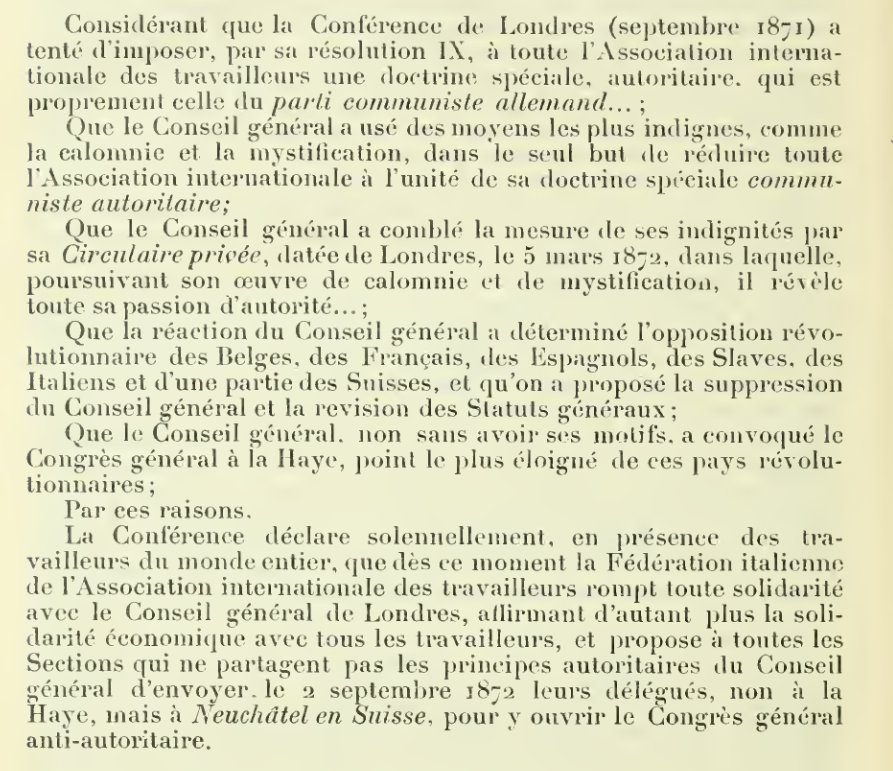
Decisions voted at the Rimini Congress

With the next International Congress approaching, and these conflicts expected to be a major and decisive debate, the Italian Federation, which was frankly aligned with Bakunin and included figures like Carlo Cafiero, Andrea Costa, and Errico Malatesta, called for a national congress in the early summer of 1872 to decide on their federation's path. While preparing for this congress, they learned that the Marxist General Council had chosen The Hague as the meeting place. This was a strategic choice intended to prevent strong participation from the Bakuninist federations. Bakunin himself was sought by the police in France and Germany for his participation in the Communes and could not travel to The Hague. The maneuver was also intended to move the central location of the International—until then situated in Switzerland, where several previous congresses had taken place—toward areas less controlled by the anarchists and their allies.

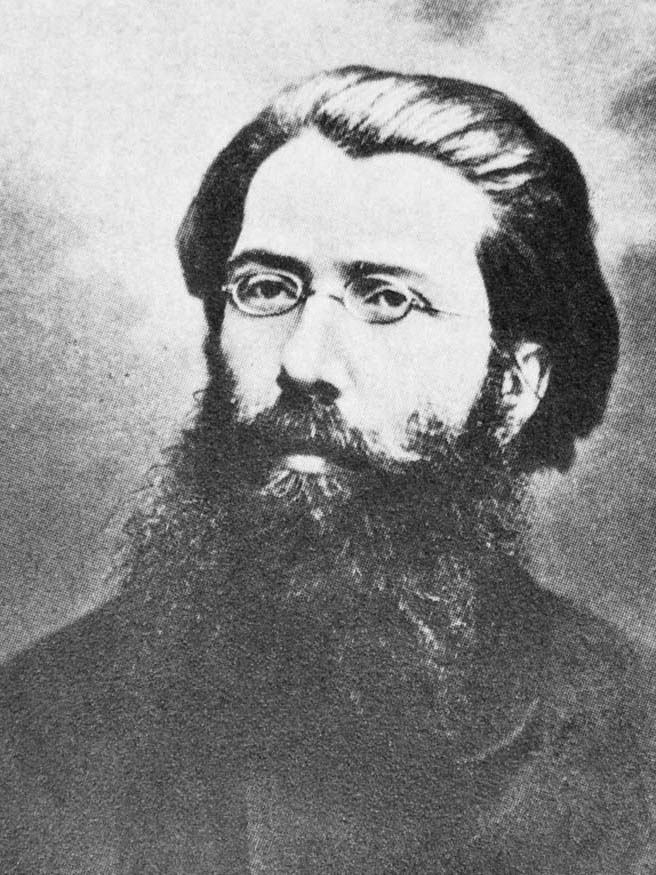
Carlo Cafiero, one of the figures of the Italian Federation (here in 1878)

In this context, while Bakunin and the Jura Federation (composed of figures like James Guillaume) ultimately chose to accept the congress location and sought to gather as many delegates as possible to attend (made difficult by the fact that their bases of support were in Spain, Italy, and France, where the International was banned), the Italian Federation met in Rimini. Given the new developments, the Italian delegates—who were confronted with the congress location (deemed particularly un-neutral by the Bakuninists) and the strong-arm addition of the declaration that considerably strengthened the powers and prerogatives of the Marxist General Council—voted for the break with the General Council. The Italian Federation decided to call for a congress of delegates from the socialist, anarchist, and other anti-authoritarian federations to meet in Neuchâtel to exclude Marx and his allies from the organization and revert to the International's original statutes.

According to James Guillaume, following the Italian Federation's decision to exclude Marx and immediately convene an anti-authoritarian congress in Switzerland, Bakunin and he negotiated with them to ask them to delay the congress until after the Hague Congress—which was accepted. They advocated for a strategy of conciliation, supporting the sending of as many delegates as possible to the Hague Congress anyway, despite the organization being under the control of the Marxists.

=== The Hague Congress ===
==== Organization of the Congress and Marxist political maneuvers ====
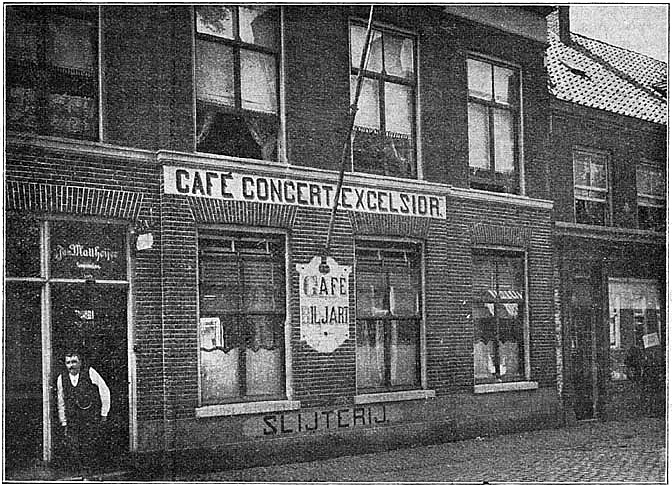
Café Concert Excelsior, Lange Lombardstraat 109, The Hague, location of the Hague Congress in 1872 (1904)

The organization of the Hague Congress was marked by the strong control the Marxists had over its proceedings, which were far from impartial and largely designed to favor their interests. In addition to the meeting location, which excluded the most important federations in terms of membership, such as Spain, many Marxist delegates held no legal mandates; given that the International was banned in France, the Marxist General Council did not publicize the names or origins of the French delegates and refused to allow the anti-authoritarian delegates to verify their authenticity. A number of these delegates, moreover, did not reside in France but in England and were part of Marx's close circles. Some had even blank mandates or sections voted without knowing for who, according to historian Zoe Baker. The location in The Hague allowed the German Marxist delegates to travel to the congress in large numbers. They were also allied with the Blanquists, another ideological movement that provided them with delegates and support.

Marx, Engels, and their allies also sought to directly prevent entire federations from participating: Engels asserted that even if the Italian Federation sent representatives, they would be refused access, and Marx tried to prevent the Spanish Federation, by far the largest of the First International, from participating, claiming they had not paid their dues. The Spanish delegates, having anticipated the issue and traveled with the dues to pay them at the congress, were eventually allowed to participate, despite Marx attempting another unsuccessful maneuver to block them.

A number of Belgian and Dutch delegates, from the country where the congress was held, were more moderate socialists who supported Bakunin out of fear of being purged in turn and thus came to support his positions and defend him.

==== Positions and votes ====
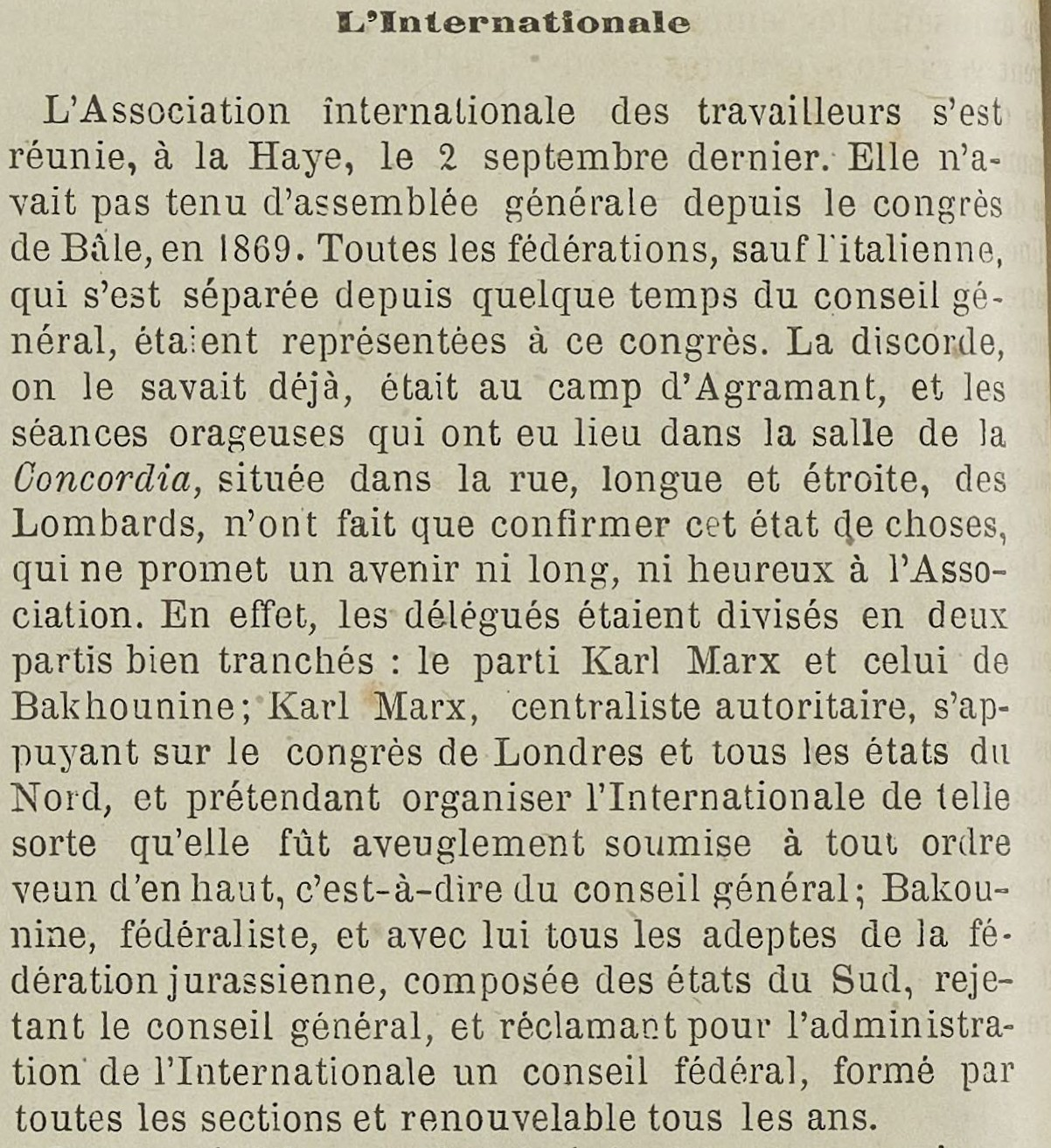
L'Illustration on the Hague Congress

The congress, dominated by the Marxist presence and in the absence of the principal party concerned, Bakunin, took place over five days, from 2 to 7 September 1872. Overall, the congress gathered a relatively small number of delegates for International Congresses at the time, which was partly due to the meeting location. 65 delegates—around forty Marxists and about 25 anti-authoritarians—were present at the congress. The anti-authoritarian, Bakuninist, and allied delegates were placed in a situation of clear inferiority against the Marxist delegates allied with the Blanquists, and over the course of the congress, a number of them left, their number decreasing throughout the proceedings.

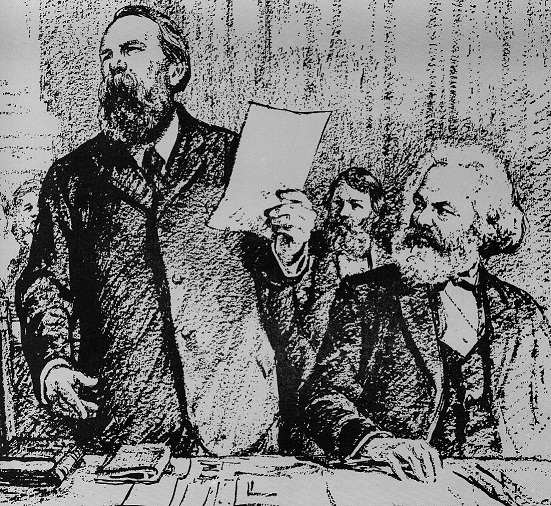
Marx and Engels at Hague Congress (unknown date)

On all matters addressed by the congress, it therefore adopted positions entirely in agreement with the Marxist stance. It decided to enshrine the declaration strengthening the power of the General Council and directly attacked Bakunin and his allies. Marx accused Bakunin of being a thief for failing to pay a printer in Russia and of not being a true revolutionary—this position being adopted by the Hague Congress. The results of this central vote at the congress were as follows:

Vote on the expulsion of Mikhail Bakunin (42 voters):

- Yes: J.-Ph. Becker, Cuno, Dereure, Dumont [Faillet], Dupont, Duval, Engels, Farkas, Fränkel, Heim, Hepner, Johaunard, Kugelmann, Lafargue, Le Moussu, Longuet, Lucain (pseudonym), Mac Donnell, Marx, Pihl, Serraillier, Sorge, Swarm [d'Entraygues], Vichard, Walter [Van Heddeghem], Wilmot (pseudonym), Wroblewski.
- No: Brismée, Coenen, Cyrille, Dave, Fluse, Herman, Van den Abeele.
- Abstentions: Alerini, Farga-Pellicer, Guillaume, Marselau, Morago, Sauva, Splingard, Schwitzguebel.

27 yes, 7 no, 8 abstentions: Bakunin's expulsion was voted.

The Hague Congress also voted for the expulsion of Guillaume but failed to exclude Adhémar Schwitzguebel, who protested by declaring that he should also be excluded since he fully supported and agreed with Guillaume.

The congress allowed for the transfer of the General Council's headquarters to New York, which gave the Marxists more complete control over this structure. At the end of the congress, the delegates emerging from the Concordia theatre hall, where they had gathered, were booed and insulted by assembled crowds shouting 'Down with the International!'

=== Reception ===
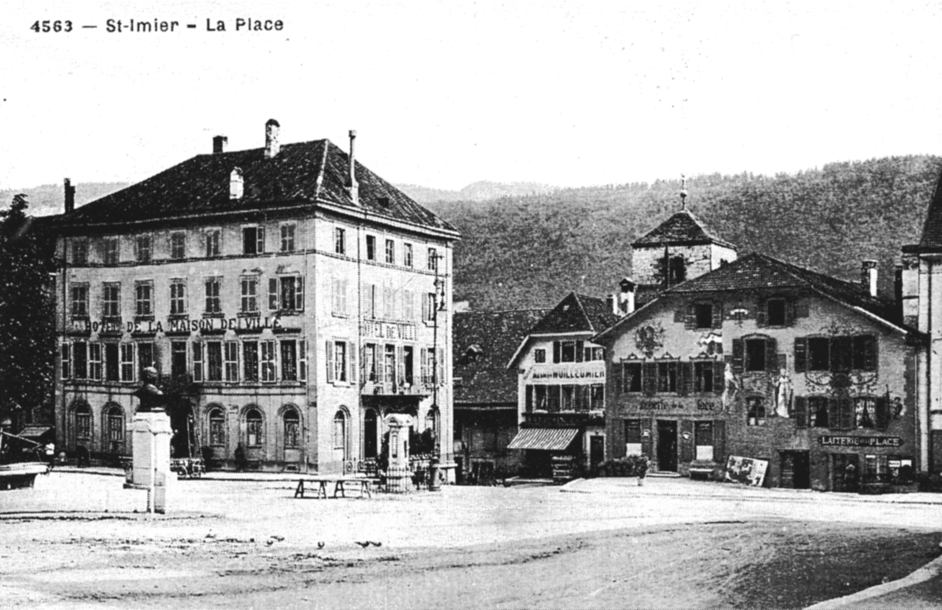
Townhall where the St. Imier Congress took place

The Hague Congress, while initially appearing as a victory for the Marxist movement, was quickly rejected by a majority of the International's federations. Robert Graham wrote about this event:

The Sonvillier Circular (an anti-Marxist/anti-authoritarian text published in 1871 as part of the conflicts) reflected the views of not only the Jura Federation, Bakunin and the Belgian Federation but the Italian sections of the International, many of the surviving French Internationalists and the largest Internationalist group, the Spanish Federation. When Marx engineered the expulsion of Bakunin and Guillaume from the International at the 1872 Hague Congress, a majority of the International’s member groups repudiated the Marxist dominated Congress and the General Council, reconstituting the International along anti-authoritarian lines.

Indeed, the anti-authoritarian and anarchists that had just been expelled and formed the majority of the International fell back on the plan proposed by the Italian Federation: to organize a congress deciding the expulsion of the Marxists and reforming the International on explicitly anti-authoritarian bases. This congress, the Saint-Imier Congress, which took place a week later, united these federations into the Anti-authoritarian International. This organization, foundational for the history of anarchism, lasted until the 1880s before giving way to other forms of coordination among anarchists, such as anarchist companionship. On their side, Marx and Engels found themselves with an organization stripped of a large part of its forces: a situation reinforced by their sidelining of the Blanquists, former allies against the anti-authoritarians whom they managed to sideline and bypass; the organization disappeared in 1876. Reflecting on the Hague Congress and its reception, Nunzio Pernicone wrote:

Marx and Engels did not convene the Hague congress of September 2–7, 1872, to prevent a schism but to bury the Bakuninist heresy. The Marxists and their Blanquist allies, who enjoyed a forty to twenty-five advantage in delegate strength, passed resolutions supporting Marx on every issue, strengthening the power of the General Council and incorporating Resolution Nine into the statutes of the International. Bakunin and his Swiss lieutenants Guillaume and Schwitzguebel, convicted of charges compiled by Engels, Marx, and his son-in-law Paul Lafargue, were expelled from the International. Marx then transferred the General Council from London to New York to prevent the Blanquists from gaining control, in effect killing the International to save it from his rivals.

== Bibliography ==
- Baker, Zoe (2023), Means and Ends: The Revolutionary Practice of Anarchism in Europe and the United States, Edinburgh: AK Press, ISBN 978-1-84935-498-1
- Berthier, René (2015), La fin de la première Internationale [The end of the First Internationale] (in French), Paris: Le Monde Libertaire, ISBN 978-2915514636
- Gerth, Hans (1958), The first International: minutes of the Hague congress of 1872, with related documents, Madison: University of Wisconsin Press (UWP), OCLC 1034670000
- Guillaume, James (1906), L'Internationale : Documents et souvenirs (1864-1878) (t. 1-2) [L'Internationale : memories and documents], vol. 2, Paris: Société nouvelle de librairie et d'édition
- Levy, Carl (2019), The Palgrave Handbook of Anarchism, Cham: Palgrave Macmillan, ISBN 978-3-319-75619-6
- Pernicone, Nunzio (1993), Italian anarchism: 1864-1892, Princeton: Princeton University Press (PUP), ISBN 978-1904859970
