= Brussels Congress (1868) =

3rd Congress of the International Workingmen's Association (IWA)

The Brussels Congress of 1868 is the common name assigned to the 3rd General Congress of the International Workingmen's Association (IWA), generally known as the First International. The meeting was held in Brussels, Belgium, in September 1868.
