= Geneva Congress (1866) =

1st Congress of the First International

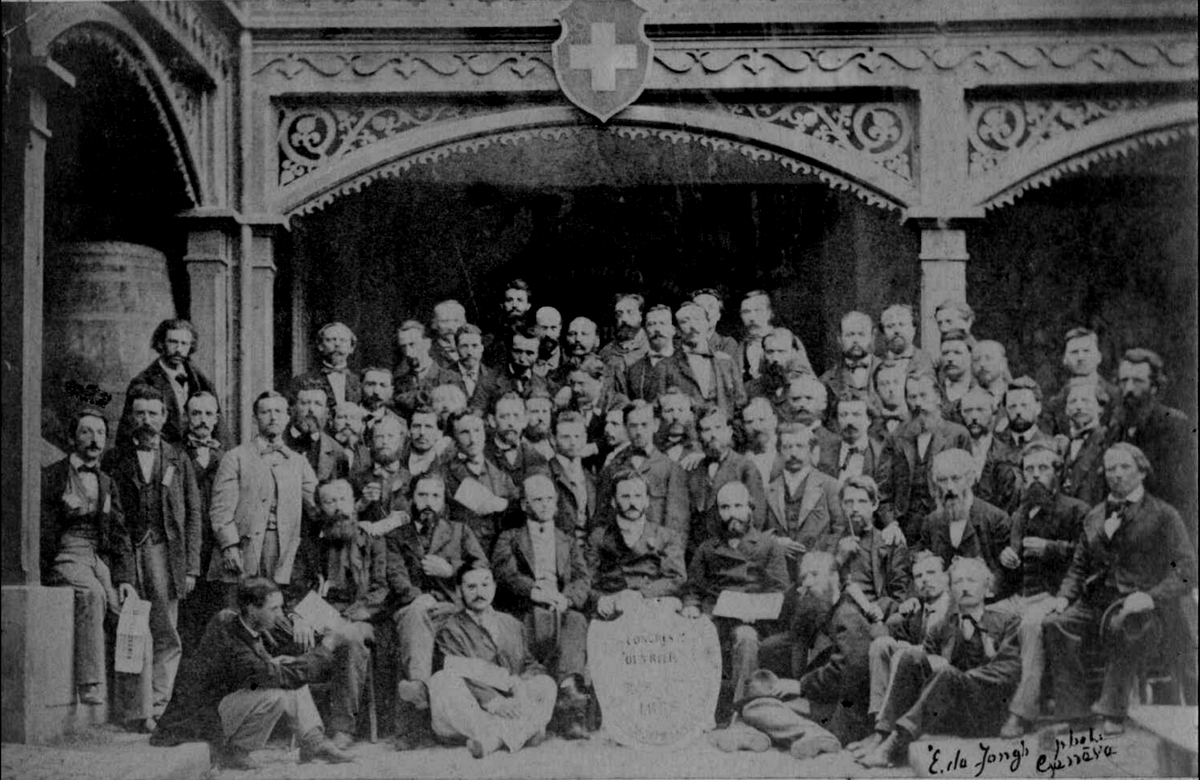
- Delegates at the Congress
- Native name: Congrès de Genève
- Date: 3–8 September 1866
- Location: Geneva
- Also known as: 1st General Congress
- Type: Congress
- Organised by: International Workingmen's Association
- Outcome: Adoption of the eight-hour day as a goal for the IWA

The Geneva Congress of 1866 is the common name assigned to the 1st General Congress of the International Workingmen's Association, held in Geneva, Switzerland from 3 to 8 September 1866. The gathering was attended by 46 regular and 14 fraternal delegates from a total of five countries. The Geneva Congress is best remembered for its watershed decision to make universal establishment of the 8-hour working day a main goal of the International Socialist movement.

== History ==
=== Background ===
The International Workingmen's Association (IWA), commonly known as the First International, was an international association of trade unionist and socialist political activists which attempted to coordinate labor activities across national boundaries. The organization is remembered for the active participation of many pioneer leaders of the modern socialist and anarchist movements, including Karl Marx and Mikhail Bakunin. Membership in the IWA was numerically small, its funding inadequate, and its institutional life short – lasting a mere 8 years from its establishment in 1864 until its termination at the Hague Congress of 1872.

Establishment of the IWA was related to ongoing efforts to coordinate the activities of the trade union movements in Great Britain and France, a project begun in connection with the 1862 London World's Fair. Economic crisis had led the imperial French government to concede the right to French workers to elect a delegation of 750 to the London exhibition. While in London certain members of this delegation headed by Henri Tolain (1828–1897) established contact with British trade union leaders and opened the door for a formal meeting in London the following summer in support of the Polish uprising of 1863.

=== Convocation ===
The 1st General Congress of the International Workingmen's Association was convened in Geneva, Switzerland on 3 September 1866. The gathering remained in session for six days, adjourning sine die on 8 September.

The convention was attended by 46 regular delegates, including 6 members of the General Council and representing 22 sections of the IWA. Of these, 20 represented 13 sections in Switzerland, 17 represented 4 sections in France, and 3 represented 4 sections in Germany. In addition, 14 fraternal delegates were in attendance, 11 of whom represented affiliated organizations, such as Swiss trade unions and educational societies.

=== Activities ===
The International Workingmen's Association took up the demand for an eight-hour day at its Congress in Geneva, declaring "The legal limitation of the working day is a preliminary condition without which all further attempts at improvements and emancipation of the working class must prove abortive", and "The Congress proposes eight hours as the legal limit of the working day." Karl Marx saw it as of vital importance to the workers' health, writing in Das Kapital (1867): "By extending the working day, therefore, capitalist production...not only produces a deterioration of human labour power by robbing it of its normal moral and physical conditions of development and activity, but also produces the premature exhaustion and death of this labour power itself."

== Bibliography ==
- Braunthal, Julius (1967). History of the International. Vol. 1. Translated by Collins, Henry; Mitchell, Kenneth. New York: Praeger. OCLC 718830167.
- Steklov, Yuri (1968) [1928]. "The Geneva Congress of the International". History of the First International. Translated by Paul, Eden; Paul, Cedar. New York: Russell & Russell. pp. 79–87. LCCN 68-10945.
