= Henri Tolain =

French socialist (1828–1897)

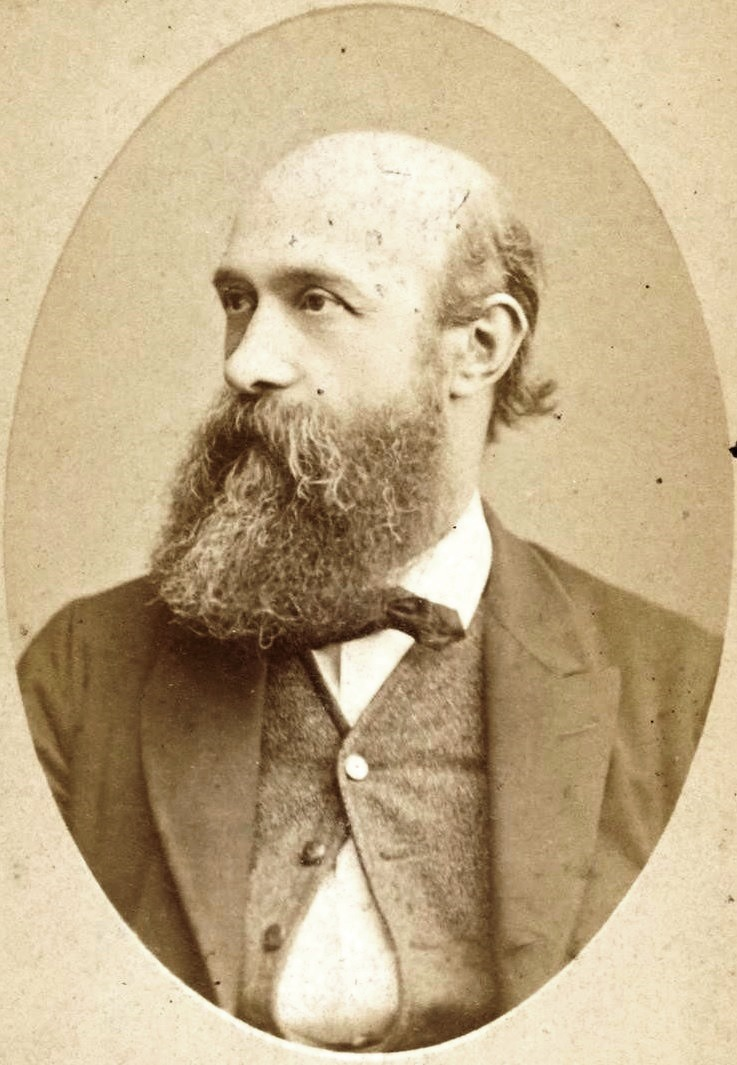
Henri Tolain

Henri Louis Tolain (French pronunciation: [ɑ̃ʁi lwi tɔlɛ̃]; 18 June 1828, Paris – 4 May 1897, Paris), was a leading member of the French trade union and socialist movement and a founding member of the First International and follower of Proudhon.

== Life ==
He was the son of Antoine Tolain, dancing master and Jeanne Louise Adelaide Pouplan. Henry Tolain apprenticed to a sculptor in bronze. A profession he practised for most of his working life, first in a workshop and in later years, at his own home.

He followed closely the teaching of the Republican Jules Andrieu and read Proudhon studiously. After the Act of March 1852 of the new Second French Empire of Louis Napoleon, he participated in the revival of mutual societies. His dream is that of an economy of production cooperatives operating with funding by credit unions. In the 1860s, through the more liberal turn of Louis Napoleon's regime, the labour movement is reborn. In October 1861, he proposed the election of representatives of the main trades in all the large cities. He was appointed Assistant Secretary of the commission on the rue du Temple. The committee elected the representatives for Paris. He enters the legislative elections of May 1863 but withdraws. He then stood in the by-election for the Seine in March 1864. On 18 June 1865 he published an article in La Tribune Ouvrière (The Workers Tribune) in which he demonstrated his opposition to cabarets and the writers of novels (a new cultural phenomenon at the time).

== The Manifesto of the Sixty ==
In 1864, with the help of Republican journalist Henri Lefort, Henri Tolain wrote a text that was signed by sixty workers. It was published in L'Opinion Nationale. This manifesto is a program of social demands to support candidates standing in a byelection that year. This text calls for a genuine democracy, political, economic and social. He protested against the exclusion of workers from political life. He also expressed the desire that the place of the world of work in society is finally recognized. His call for strikes to be legalized was partially met by the Ollivier act of May 25, 1864, but only under strict limitations of not causing violence, and not infringing the 'freedom to work'.

The Manifesto of the Sixty raises seven immediate demands:

- Repeal of Section 1781 of the French Civil Code which states that employers have the final say in matters of the pay of their workers.
- Abolish the (anti-)Combinations Act
- Create trade associations (chambres syndicales)
- Enlarge the competencies of friendly and mutual assurance societies
- Regulate the employment of women
- Reform apprenticeships
- Make primary and trade/professional education free

Although moderate in tone, the significance of the manifesto in defending interests specific to workers was recognised both by Marx and later historians as a milestone in the French workers movement. It was in reaction to this text that Proudhon composed one of his last texts, De la capacité politique des classes ouvrières (The Political Capacity of the Working Class), published posthumously in 1865.

== International Workingmen's Association ==
In 1862, during the Universal Exhibition of London, Henri Tolain was part of a delegation of French trade unionists whose attendance had been subsidised by Napoleon III for the purposes of studying British products, inventions and industrial processes. There they met with their British counterparts through the efforts of George Odger. In 1863, as a follow-up Henry Tolain and other French unionists participated in a monster meeting on Poland. These meetings lay the groundwork that led up to the IWA's 1864 founding meeting in St. Martin's Hall. He initially became the most influential person in the Paris section of the IWA which opened an office in January 1865, at rue Gravilliers. He was one of three secretaries of the Paris section responsible for relations with the General Council in London until 1867. His influence on the movement was at its peak when he wrote the "Memorandum for the French delegates" at the Geneva congress of the International. But under the pressure of the wave strikes of 1867, he was unable to restrict the "Gravilliers" to the role of a mutual study circle. In December 1867, Henry Tolain was arrested and interrogated. In March 1868 he was sentenced to a fine of 100 francs. Tolain continues to defend mutualism and private property during the 1868 Brussels congress where the Belgian socialist César de Paepe led the collectivist majority to defeat the Proudhonians over the land question.

== The "treason" of Henri Tolain ==
Tolain's influence gradually declined. Indeed, he couldn't find a Parisian section to delegate to the 1869 IWA Congress in Basel. He had to get a mandate from the bakers of Marseille. He is criticized for his closeness to the Royal Palace and for having abandoned "the smock and chisel” he worked on the books for the tinsmith Chavagnat since 1867.

After the French defeat at the Battle of Sedan, he was elected deputy mayor of the 11th arrondissement of Paris in November 1870 during the Siege of Paris. Standing on an IWA ticket for the French legislative elections of February 1871, he was elected deputy for the Seine.

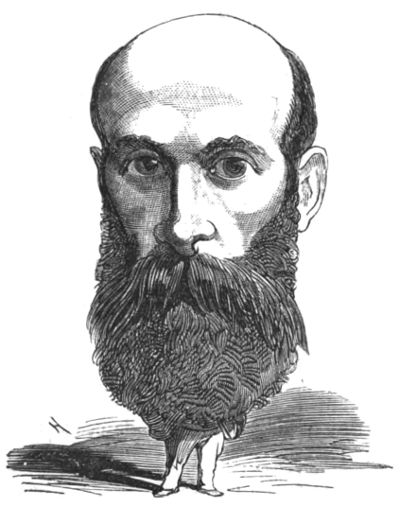
Caricature of Henri Tolain published in Le Trombinoscope of Touchetout in 1873.

However, once elected as deputy, Tolain disavowed the Commune, proclaimed after the uprising of 18 March 1871. On 12 April he was expelled for "having deserted his cause in the most cowardly and shameful manner" by the Federal Council of the Parisian sections of the International. He was later elected thereafter Senator for the Seine.

From 1876 he was a campaigner for the legalisation of trade unions, which would not be passed until the Waldeck-Rousseau law of 1884. He became an influential figure in the Republican "opportunism" role for which he received much criticism from the Socialists.
