= First International =

International socialist organization (1864–1876)

International Workingmen's Association First International
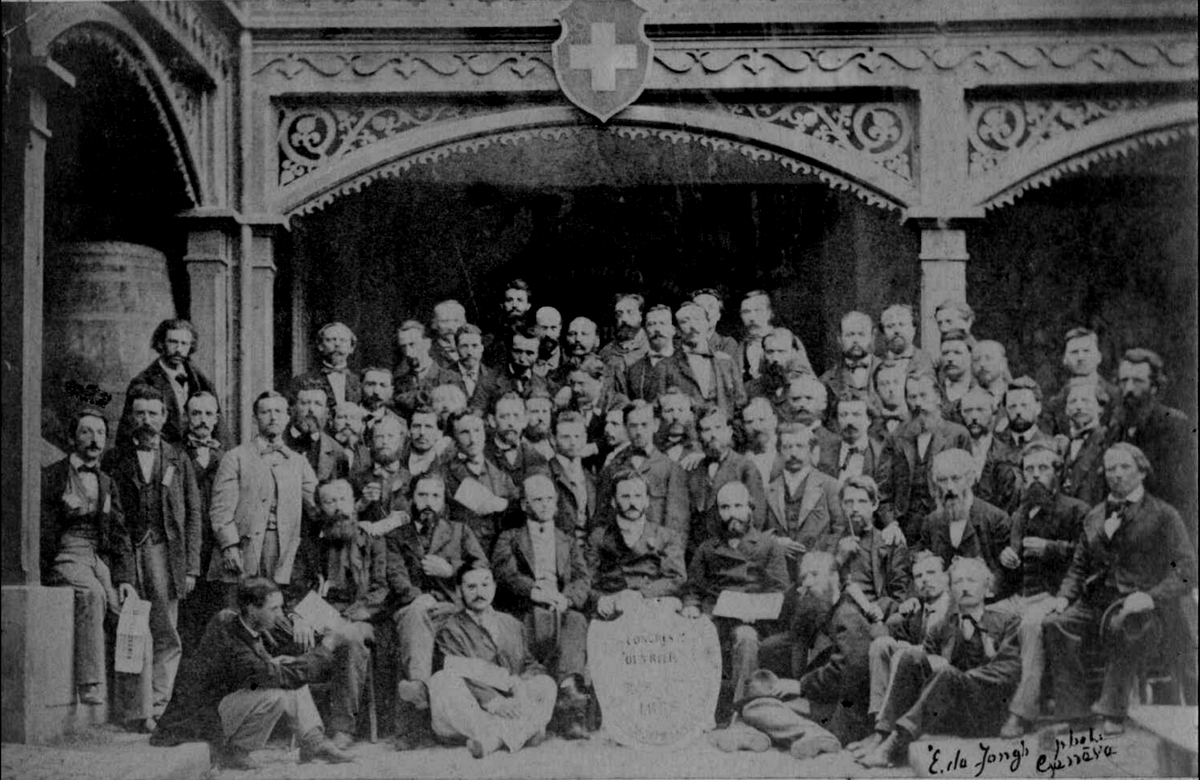
- Delegates at the 1866 Geneva Congress
- Abbreviation: IWA
- Governing body: General Council
- Founded: 28 September 1864
- Dissolved: 15 July 1876
- Preceded by: International Association
- Succeeded by: Anti-authoritarian International (1872); Second International (1889)
- Headquarters: London (1864–1872); New York City (1872–1876)
- Membership: ~150,000 (peak; 1871–72)
- Ideology: Socialism (faction); Communism (faction); Anarchism (faction; until 1872)
- Political position: Left-wing to far-left

The International Workingmen's Association (IWA), commonly known as the First International, was a political international which aimed to unite a variety of left-wing political groups and trade union organizations based on the working class and class struggle. It was founded in 1864 at a workers' meeting in St Martin's Hall, London, and its first congress was held in 1866 in Geneva.

The IWA's history was characterized by internal conflicts between different socialist and anarchist factions. The initial ideological struggle was between the communists or Marxists, centred around Karl Marx on the General Council, and the mutualists or followers of Pierre-Joseph Proudhon. The communists successfully displaced the mutualists as the dominant ideological trend at the Brussels Congress in 1868. The rise of Mikhail Bakunin's collectivist anarchist faction in the late 1860s led to a more intense conflict over the role of the state and political action in achieving socialism. The organization reached its peak following the Paris Commune of 1871, which was celebrated and defended by the International in Marx's influential address, The Civil War in France. The bloody suppression of the Commune, however, led to a period of harsh government repression against the IWA.

The internal divisions culminated in a definitive split at the Hague Congress in 1872, where Bakunin and his ally James Guillaume were expelled. In a strategic move to prevent the organization from falling under the control of other factions, the congress voted to transfer the seat of the General Council to New York City. This decision effectively marked the end of the IWA as a mass European movement. The New York-based General Council officially disbanded the original International in 1876. The anarchist wing formed a rival International at St. Imier, but it also dissolved by the late 1870s.

Although it was short-lived, the First International was a highly significant event in the history of the labour movement. It helped establish the theoretical foundations of the main currents of socialism, communism, and anarchism, and its experience was crucial for the development of mass-based national social democratic parties that formed the Second International in 1889.

== Background ==
The idea of international working-class solidarity was a product of the development of capitalism in the 19th century, which created a global market and a global proletariat with common interests. Early socialist and communist thinkers, from Robert Owen to Karl Marx, viewed socialism as an international project. The first concrete attempts to form international workers' organizations emerged in the 1830s and 1840s among political exiles in Paris, such as the German Communist League, for whom Marx and Friedrich Engels wrote The Communist Manifesto.

In Britain, the Chartist movement, while primarily national, also showed strong internationalist leanings, expressing solidarity with oppressed peoples across the world and maintaining contact with continental radicals. In November 1844, the "Fraternal Democrats" was established in London by political refugees and Chartist leaders, including George Julian Harney. It was the first international democratic organization with a working-class character, holding the motto "All men are brethren." The organization was a key forerunner of the IWA, and its structure, with national secretaries forming an executive, served as a model for the later International. The Fraternal Democrats advocated for communistic ideas, proclaiming that "the earth with all its natural productions is the common property of all" and denouncing national prejudices.

The revolutionary wave of 1848 swept across Europe, and although the Fraternal Democrats reached their peak during this period, the subsequent decade of reaction led to their decline and the general apathy of the British working class. The 1850s became "almost a dead period for Socialist thought", with working-class movements in eclipse. The idea of international solidarity was revived in the mid-1850s with the formation of the International Committee in London, led by Ernest Jones. This committee, formed to welcome French exiles and protest a planned visit by Napoleon III, anticipated the organizational forms of the IWA and championed the idea of an "international alliance". In 1856, the committee developed into the International Association, a precursor which assumed the "shape of a public international working-class movement" before its demise a few years later.

== History ==
=== Foundation ===
Reflecting its spontaneous origins, the French workers' leader Benoît Malon stated: "In the same way that it has no masters, the International has no founders; it came into existence... out of the social necessities of our epoch and out of the growing sufferings of the working class."

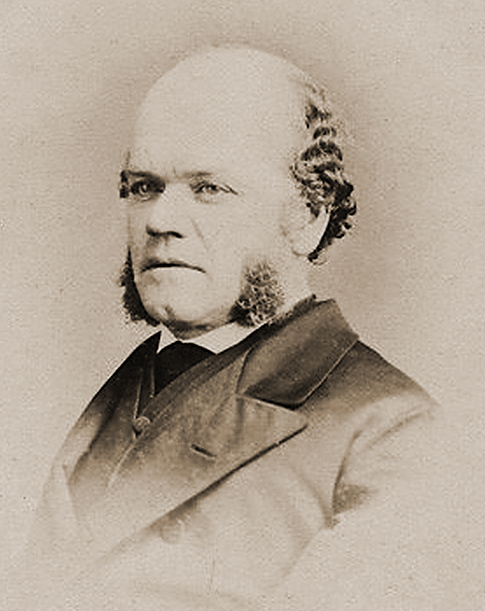
George Odger

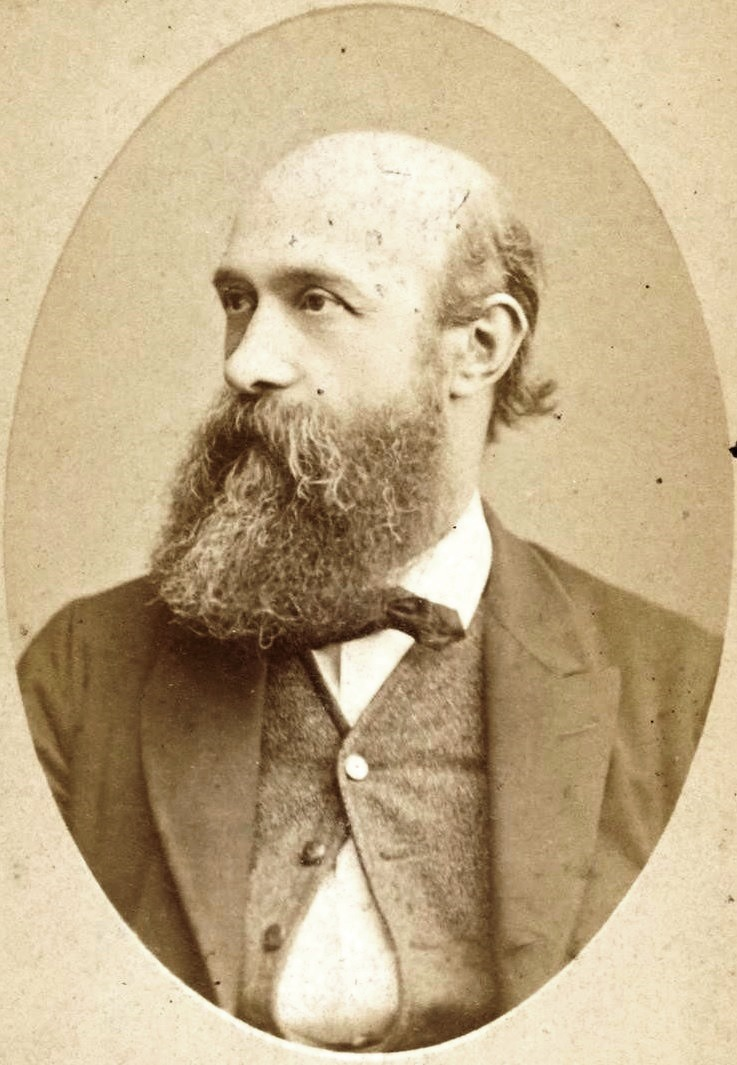
Henri Tolain

The political and economic crises of the late 1850s and early 1860s led to a resurgence of the workers' movement across Europe. In Britain, a new generation of trade union leaders, known as the "Junta," emerged, advocating for greater political engagement and solidarity. They organized solidarity actions for various international causes, including support for Giuseppe Garibaldi's struggle for Italian independence, opposition to Russian repression in Poland, and support for the Union side in the American Civil War. In France, where trade unions were illegal but tolerated as friendly societies, workers influenced by Proudhonism began to seek independent political representation, culminating in the "Manifesto of the Sixty" in 1864, which was written by Henri Tolain and proclaimed the existence of a distinct proletariat class. Initial contacts between British and French workers' leaders, established during the 1862 London International Exhibition, led to a meeting in London in July 1863 that set the stage for a new international organization. The preparatory Address of English to French Workmen, drafted by trade union leader George Odger, articulated the need for international cooperation to prevent the importation of foreign workers to break strikes:

A fraternity of peoples is highly necessary for the cause of labour, for we find that whenever we attempt to better our social condition by reducing the hours of toil, or by raising the price of labour, our employers threaten us with bringing over Frenchmen, Germans, Belgians and others to do our work at a reduced rate of wages; and we are sorry to say that this has been done, though not from any desire on the part of our continental brethren to injure us, but through a want of regular and systematic communication between the industrial classes of all countries. Our aim is to bring up the wages of the ill-paid to as near a level as possible with that of those who are better remunerated, and not to allow our employers to play us off one against the other, and so drag us down to the lowest possible condition, suitable to their avaricious bargaining.

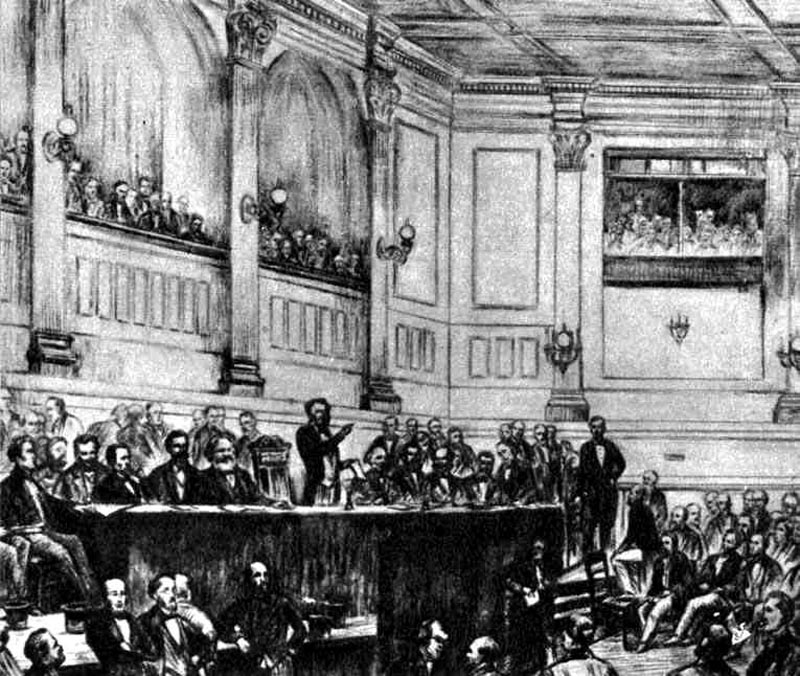
Depiction of the IWA's founding meeting at St Martin's Hall in London, 1864

On 28 September 1864, a great international meeting was held in St Martin's Hall in London, attended by some 2,000 workers. The event was primarily a joint affair of British and French labor leaders, including Odger and Tolain. The assembly unanimously resolved to found an international organization of workers, with its central committee, which became known as the General Council, to be based in London. A committee of twenty-one was elected to draft the rules and program. The committee included prominent British trade union leaders like Odger, William Randal Cremer, and George Howell; French representatives Tolain, Charles Limousin, Eugène Varlin, and Eugène Dupont; and exiled radicals including the Italian Mazzinist Luigi Wolff and the German socialist Karl Marx. The meeting was presided over by the English Positivist professor Edward Spencer Beesly. Though he was not an organizer of the meeting and sat "in a non-speaking capacity on the platform", Marx was invited to join the committee by the German tailor Johann Eccarius, who was an active figure in the British trade union movement, and played a decisive role from the outset.

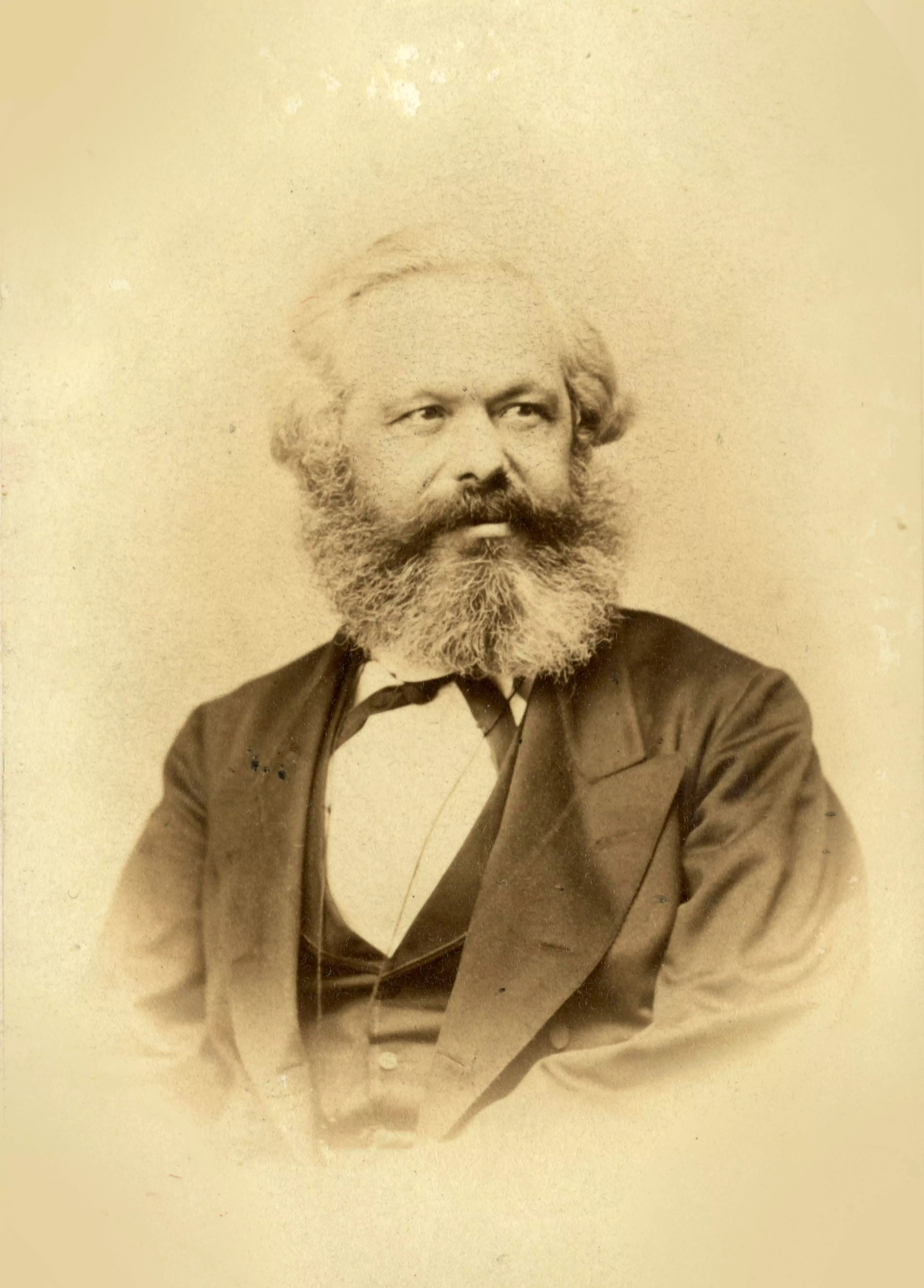
Karl Marx

Marx drafted the two foundational documents of the association: the Inaugural Address of the International Working Men's Association and the Provisional Rules of the Association. After early drafts by Mazzinists and Owenites were rejected, Marx's versions were enthusiastically accepted. The Address analyzed the condition of the working class since 1848, highlighting the stark contrast between the growth of capitalist wealth and the persistence of working-class misery. Marx was careful to avoid language that would alienate the organization's diverse founders. He pointed to two victories for the "political economy of the working class": the legislative success of the ten-hours day in Britain and the growth of the co-operative movement. It concluded that to achieve emancipation, the workers must conquer political power and that their success depended on international solidarity, proclaiming the famous slogan from The Communist Manifesto: "Proletarians of all countries, unite!". The Preamble to the Provisional Rules set forth the core principles: that the emancipation of the working classes must be achieved by the workers themselves, and that this economic emancipation was the "great end to which every political movement ought to be subordinate as a means."

=== Internal conflicts and ideological development ===
The IWA was an ideologically heterogeneous body, encompassing a wide range of socialist, communist, and anarchist viewpoints. Its history was marked by a continuous struggle between its various factions, primarily between the communists (or Marxists) and the anti-statist wings, first the mutualists (followers of Pierre-Joseph Proudhon) and later the collectivists (followers of Mikhail Bakunin).

==== Proudhonists versus communists ====
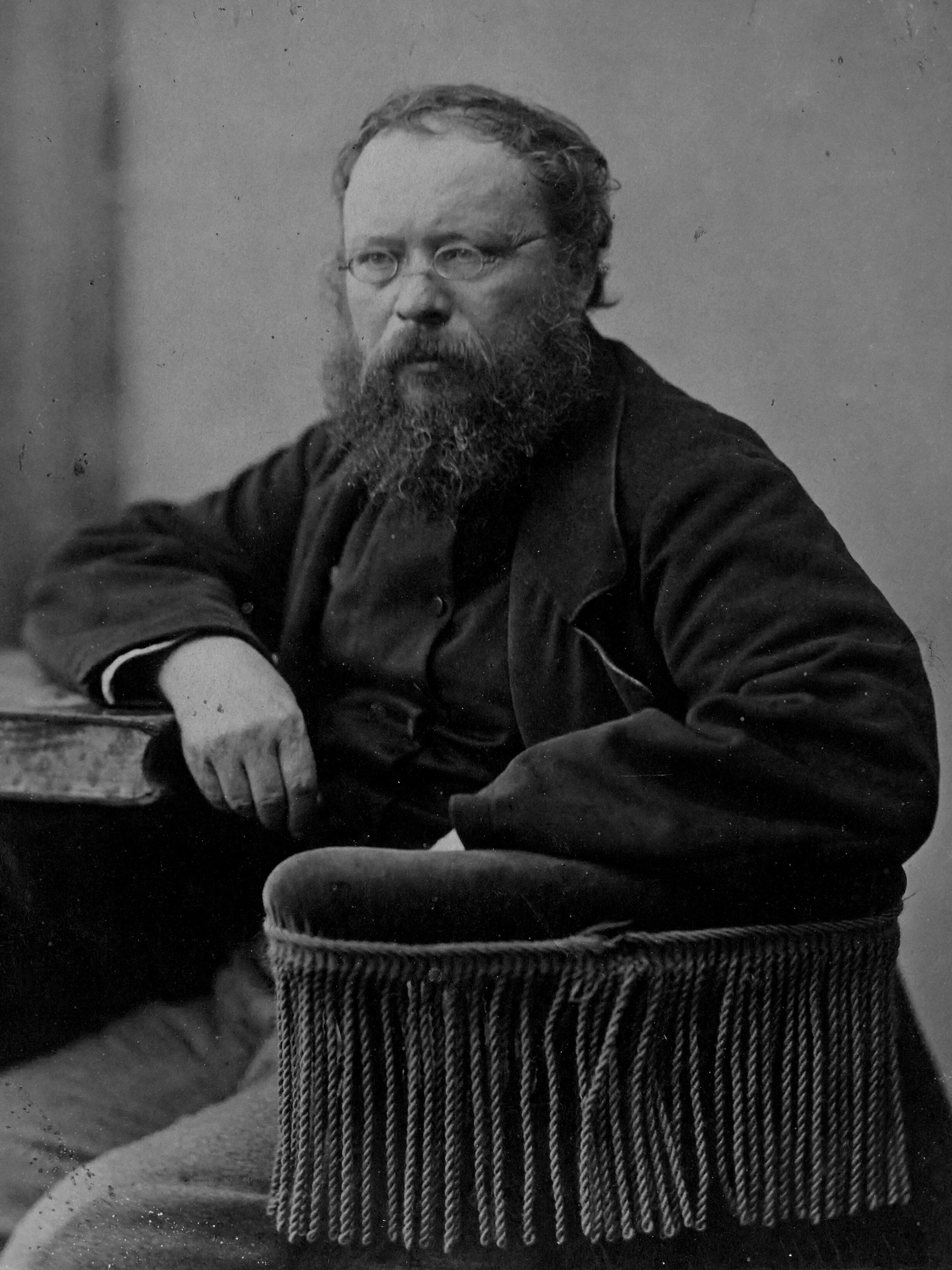
Pierre-Joseph Proudhon

The French members of the International were initially dominated by followers of Pierre-Joseph Proudhon. Proudhonism, or mutualism, was a form of market socialism based on the idea of "free credit" and "equitable exchange" among small independent producers. The Proudhonists were staunchly opposed to political action, strikes, trade unions, and the collective ownership of property. They viewed the state as an oppressive institution to be ignored rather than captured, and they opposed any form of centralized organization. This put them in direct conflict with the General Council, particularly with Marx, who advocated for a program of communism, political action through an independent workers' party, and the necessity of the strike as a weapon in the class struggle.

The first congresses of the International became battlegrounds for these opposing views. At the London Conference of 1865, the Parisian mutualists put forward a program based on Proudhon's ideas, but it was largely overshadowed by the General Council's Marx-penned agenda. At the Geneva Congress (1866), the Proudhonists were largely defeated. The congress passed resolutions, based on Marx's instructions to the General Council delegates, affirming the importance of trade unions, advocating for the eight-hour day and the abolition of child labour, and recognizing the need for legislative intervention in the economy. At the Lausanne Congress (1867), the question of property was debated, with the first resolutions favouring state ownership of transport and exchange being passed. The final victory for the communists came at the Brussels Congress (1868), which passed a resolution declaring that mines, quarries, railways, and arable land should become the common property of society, to be operated by producers' co-operatives and federated communes. The resolution stated:

That the quarries, collieries, and other mines, as well as the railways, ought in a normal state of society to belong to the community represented by the state, a state itself subject to the laws of justice. [...] The Congress thinks that the economical development of modern society will create the social necessity of converting arable land into the common property of society, and of letting the soil on behalf of the state to agricultural companies under conditions analogous to those stated in regard to mines and railways.

At the time, this turn towards communism was not widely associated with Marx, whose economic theories were still relatively unknown among the delegates.

==== Bakunin and the anarchists ====
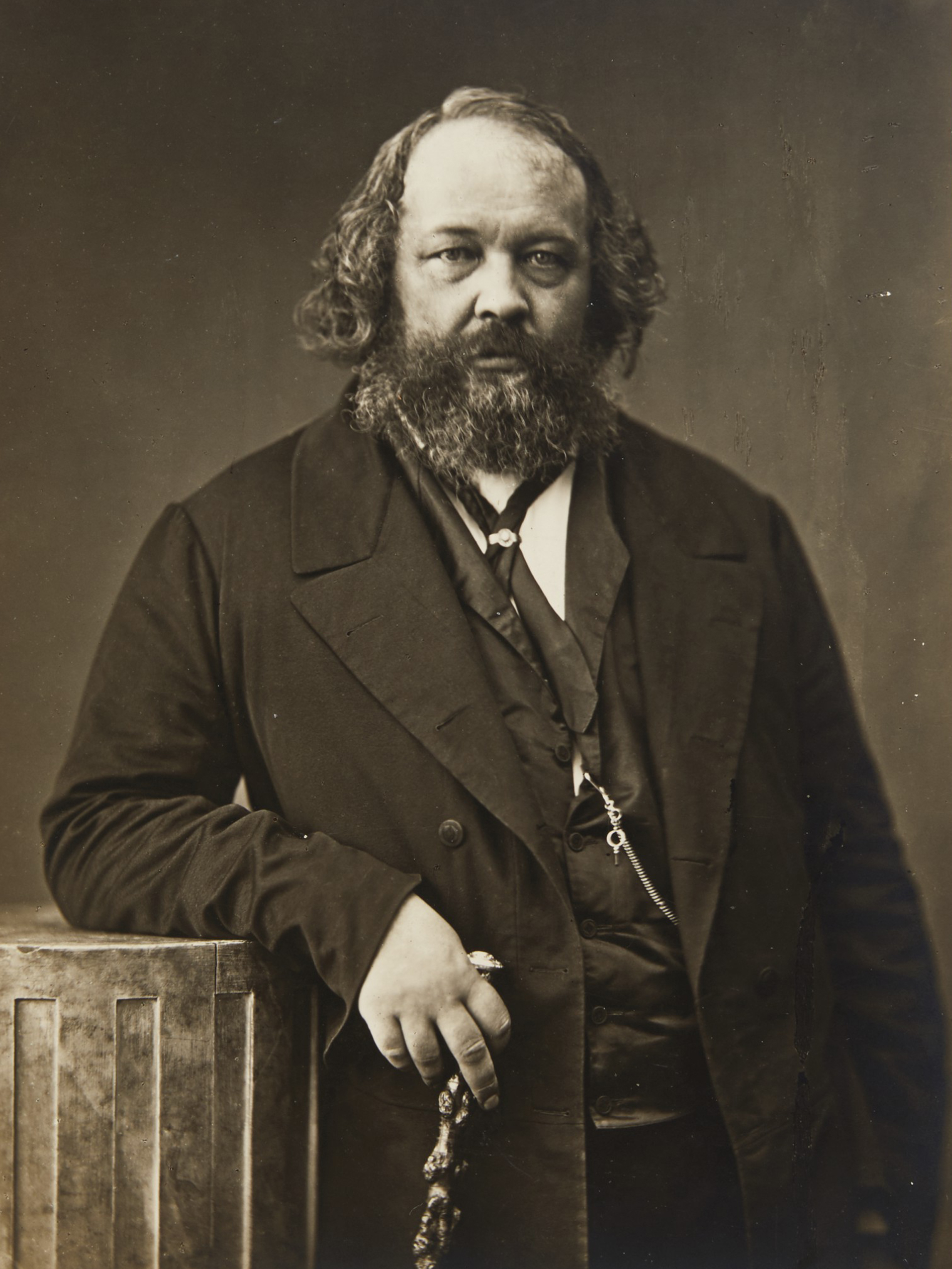
Mikhail Bakunin

In 1868, the anti-statist opposition to the General Council coalesced around the Russian revolutionary Mikhail Bakunin, who joined the Geneva section of the International. Bakunin and his followers, known as collectivists or anarchists, while agreeing with the Marxists on the need for collective ownership of property, radically diverged on the question of the state and political action. Bakunin advocated for the complete abolition of the state and all forms of political authority, which he saw as inherently oppressive. He rejected the Marxist concept of the "dictatorship of the proletariat," arguing that any state, even a "workers' state," would inevitably become a new form of tyranny. The primary means for social change, in Bakunin's view, was not organized political action but the spontaneous revolutionary instincts of the masses, particularly the peasantry and the Lumpenproletariat.

Bakunin established a secret society within the IWA called the "International Alliance of Socialist Democracy". When the Alliance applied to join the International as an organized body with its own program and leadership, the General Council refused in December 1868, describing it as "a second international body operating within and outside the International Working Men’s Association" and a means for "the intrigues of every race and nationality". Although the Alliance officially disbanded in March 1869, its sections were admitted as regular branches of the International, and the secret network continued to operate, aiming to win over the International to Bakunin's program.

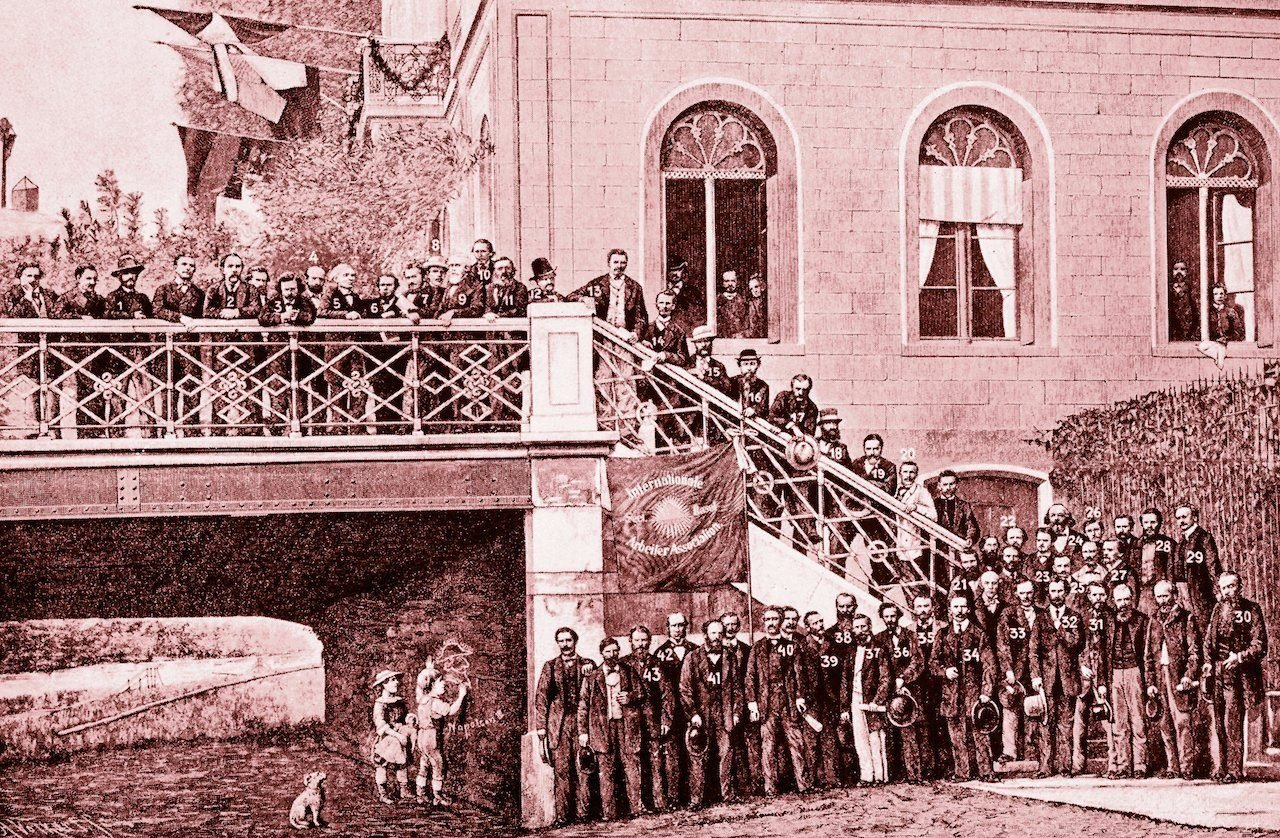
Depiction of delegates at the 1869 Basel Congress

The conflict came to a head at the Basel Congress (1869). While the congress reaffirmed the Brussels resolution on the collectivization of land, a major clash occurred over the right of inheritance. Bakunin argued for its immediate and complete abolition as a prerequisite for social change. Marx, through the General Council's report, argued that the abolition of inheritance would be the result of the abolition of private property, not its cause, and proposed transitional measures like increased inheritance taxes. Bakunin's proposal received 32 votes for, 23 against, and 13 abstentions, failing to achieve the necessary majority. The General Council's proposal was defeated with 19 votes for, 37 against, and 6 abstentions. The outcome was seen as a victory for Bakunin and a demonstration of his growing influence, though his motion had also failed. In a surprising move, however, Bakunin voted with the Marxists to grant the General Council greater powers, including the right to suspend sections that acted against the International's interests, perhaps because the Council had recently accepted his Alliance's Geneva section into membership.

=== Franco-Prussian War and the Paris Commune ===
The period following the Basel Congress represented the zenith of the International's influence and membership. The IWA was deeply involved in the burgeoning strike movement across the continent, offering financial and organizational support and preventing the importation of strikebreakers, which greatly enhanced its prestige among the working class.

The outbreak of the Franco-Prussian War in July 1870 was a severe blow to the International. The General Council, in a manifesto written by Marx, denounced the war as a dynastic conflict and called upon French and German workers to oppose their governments. After the defeat of Napoleon III and the proclamation of the French Republic, the General Council issued a second manifesto, warning the German workers against a war of conquest and protesting the planned annexation of Alsace-Lorraine. While German social democratic leaders August Bebel and Wilhelm Liebknecht abstained from the initial war credits vote, their principled anti-war stance earned them arrest and prosecution.

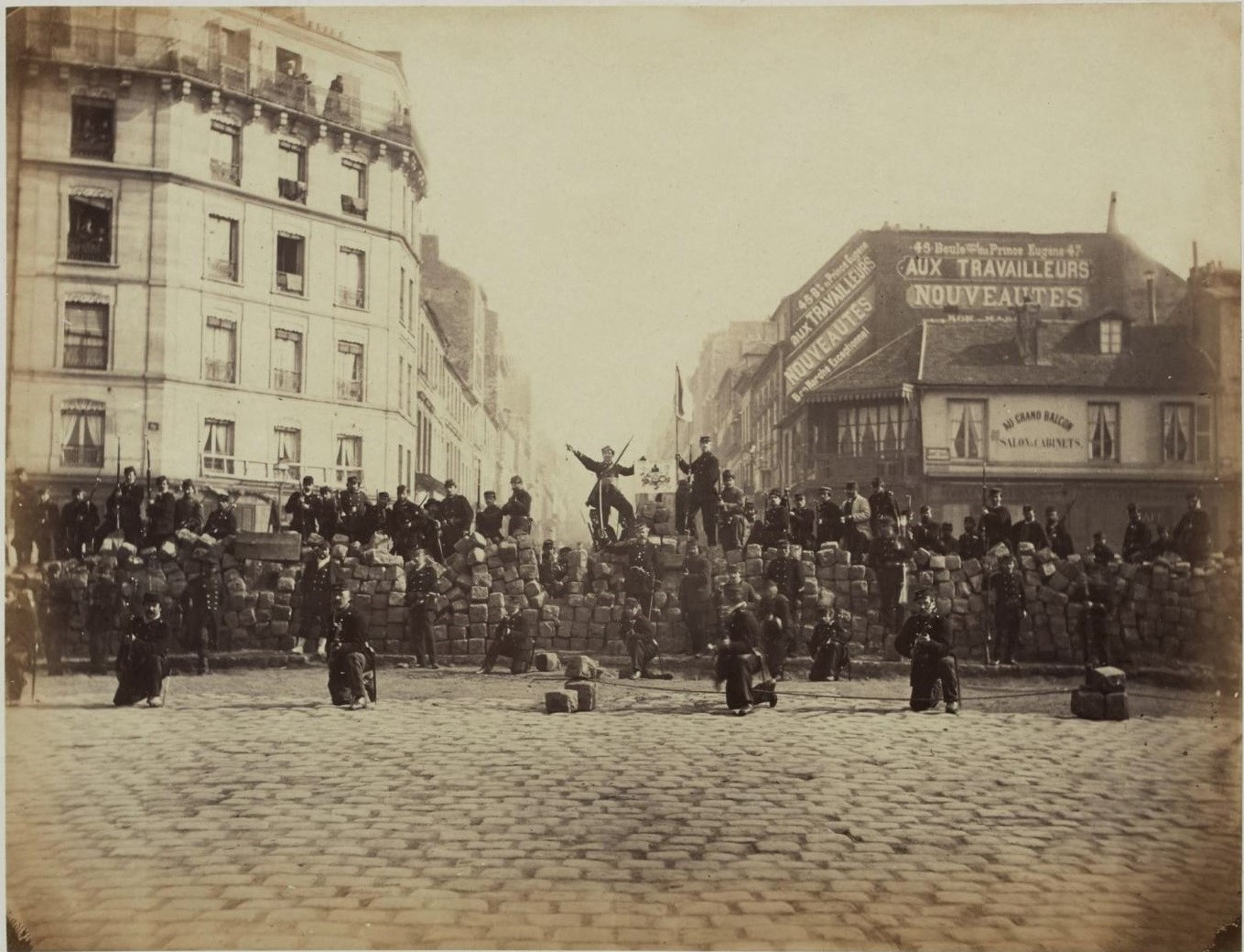
Barricade during the Paris Commune of 1871

The most significant event of this period was the Paris Commune of 1871. Although the International as an organization did not instigate the Commune, its Parisian members played an influential role. Around a third of the members of the Commune's council were members of the International, including prominent figures like Eugène Varlin, Benoît Malon, and Leó Frankel. They formed part of the minority faction, advocating for social and economic reforms and opposing the Jacobin-Blanquist majority's focus on purely political and military measures. Following the bloody suppression of the Commune, Marx, on behalf of the General Council, wrote The Civil War in France, a powerful defense of the Commune that hailed it as the first historical example of the "dictatorship of the proletariat" and a political form for the economic emancipation of labour. The fall of the Commune dealt a heavy blow to the IWA, ushering in a period of harsh reaction and government persecution across Europe, including a legal ban on the International in France. The British trade union leaders, who had never been revolutionaries, recoiled from Marx's defense of the Commune and distanced themselves from the organization.

=== Split at the Hague Congress ===
The aftermath of the Paris Commune intensified the internal conflict within the International. The experience of the Commune reinforced the Marxist view on the necessity of an independent political party of the working class to conquer state power. This was formally expressed at the London Conference of 1871, which passed a resolution declaring that "against this collective power of the propertied classes the working class cannot act, as a class, except by constituting itself into a political party, distinct from, and opposed to, all old parties formed by the propertied classes".

This resolution was a direct challenge to the anarchists. The Bakuninist Jura Federation, at its Sonvillier Congress in November 1871, issued a circular to all federations denouncing the London Conference's decision as an imposition of "authoritarian" German communist doctrine and calling for the replacement of the centralized General Council with a "free federation of autonomous groups." The Spanish, Italian, and Belgian federations, where Bakuninist influence was strong, rallied to the side of the Jurassians.

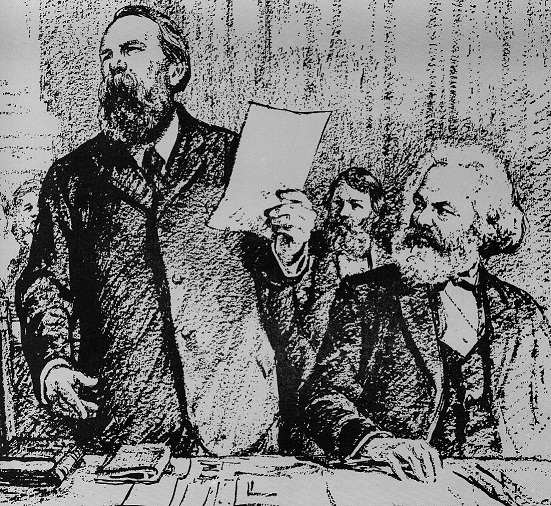
Depiction of Marx and Engels at the Hague Congress, 1872

The final showdown occurred at the Hague Congress in September 1872. The congress was the most representative in the International's history, with 65 delegates from across Europe, America, and even Australia. The Marxist faction secured a majority, albeit a contested one, thanks to a large delegation from London holding numerous mandates from sympathetic groups. The congress reaffirmed the London Conference's resolution on political action, incorporating it into the Association's rules as Article 7a. Following the report of a special committee, Bakunin and James Guillaume were expelled from the International for their involvement in a secret society (the Alliance) and for fraudulent activities, including an attempt at intimidation related to Bakunin's unfinished translation of Das Kapital. In a final, decisive move proposed by Engels, the congress voted to transfer the seat of the General Council from London to New York City. This decision, intended to save the Council from falling into the hands of either the Blanquists or the anarchists, effectively marked the end of the First International as a functioning European organization.

=== After the split: two Internationals ===
The transfer of the General Council to New York proved fatal to the Marxist wing of the International. Cut off from the main currents of the European workers' movement, the new Council, led by Friedrich Sorge, found its influence rapidly waning. In Europe, only Germany showed continued adherence, but the nascent Social Democratic Party was focused on its national development. In Britain, the movement split and collapsed, with its former leaders drifting into liberal reformism. The Geneva Congress of 1873, the only one held under the New York Council's authority, was a "pitiful affair" composed almost entirely of Swiss delegates and described by Marx as an "inevitable 'fiasco'". Recognizing the futility of continuing the organization in its old form, Marx and Engels supported its formal dissolution. The final act took place at a conference in Philadelphia on 15 July 1876, where the International Workingmen's Association was officially disbanded, with the delegates proclaiming that "the International is dead!" but also expressing confidence that "the principles of the organisation [are] recognised and defended by the progressive working men of the entire civilised world."

Immediately following the Hague Congress, the expelled anarchist wing held its own congress at St. Imier, Switzerland. They rejected the Hague resolutions, declared the General Council abolished, and established a new International based on a "pact of friendship, solidarity and mutual defence" and the principles of federalism and the "autonomy of sections." The St. Imier Congress resolution on the political action of the proletariat stated:

1. That the destruction of all political power is the first task of the proletariat;
2. That any organization of so-called provisional and revolutionary political power to bring about such destruction can only be a further deception, and would be as dangerous to the proletariat as all governments existing today;
3. That, rejecting all compromise to reach the fulfilment of social Revolution, the proletarians of all countries must establish, outside of all bourgeois politics, the solidarity of revolutionary action.

This "anti-authoritarian" International, supported by the Spanish, Italian, Belgian, and Jura federations, held several congresses (Geneva 1873, Brussels 1874, Berne 1876). However, it was plagued by internal divisions and strategic sterility. Its refusal to engage in the political struggles of the day isolated it from the broader working-class movement, which was increasingly organizing into national social democratic parties. Its focus on "propaganda by deed"—instigating futile local insurrections, such as the Bologna uprising of 1874 and the Benevento putsch of 1877—proved disastrous. The movement also faced internal debates over the nature of a post-state society, with figures like the Belgian César De Paepe advocating for a federal "People's State" (Volksstaat), a position that satisfied neither the pure anarchists nor the Marxists. By the late 1870s, the Anarchist International had effectively disintegrated, with its last congress held at Verviers in 1877.

== Congresses and Conferences ==
- Founding Meeting: London, 28 September 1864
- London Conference: 25–29 September 1865
- First Congress: Geneva, 3–8 September 1866
- Second Congress: Lausanne, 2–8 September 1867
- Third Congress: Brussels, 6–13 September 1868
- Fourth Congress: Basel, 6–12 September 1869
- London Delegate Conference: 17–23 September 1871
- Fifth Congress: The Hague, 2–7 September 1872

"Centralist" or "Marxist" International:

- Sixth Congress: Geneva, 7–13 September 1873
- Philadelphia Delegate Conference: 15 July 1876

"Autonomist" or "Anti-Authoritarian" International:

- St. Imier Congress: 15–16 September 1872
- Sixth Congress: Geneva, 1–6 September 1873
- Seventh Congress: Brussels, 7–13 September 1874
- Eighth Congress: Berne, 26–30 October 1876
- Ninth Congress: Verviers, 6–8 September 1877

== Membership ==
Contemporary reports of the IWA's size varied widely. While its own leaders were prone to exaggeration, government agencies also tended to overestimate its numbers; the public prosecutor in Paris claimed 800,000 members in France in 1870, while The Times reported 2.5 million members across Europe in 1871. Modern research, however, places the number of members at its peak in 1871–72 at around 150,000, with a wider periphery of sympathisers. The International's strength lay not in its individual members but in its affiliated trade unions.

Country	Peak year	Membership
Britain	1867	50,000
Switzerland	1870	6,000
France	1871	More than 30,000
Belgium	1871	More than 30,000
United States	1872	4,000
Germany	1870	11,000 (including the members of the Social Democratic Workers' Party)
Spain	1873	About 30,000
Italy	1873	About 25,000
Netherlands	1872	Less than 1,000
Denmark	1872	A couple of thousands
Portugal	1872	Less than 1,000
Ireland	1872	Less than 1,000
Austria-Hungary	1872	A couple of thousands

== Legacy ==
"It is not ... a mere improvement that is contemplated, but nothing less than a regeneration, and that not of one nation only, but of mankind. This is certainly the most extensive aim ever contemplated by any institution, with the exception, perhaps, of the Christian Church. To be brief, this is the programme of the International Workingmen's Association."

— The Times in a leading article, September 1868, during the Brussels Congress of the First International.

Although the First International had a short lifespan and did not achieve its primary goal of leading a successful social revolution, its historical significance is immense. It was the first mass international movement of the working class and served as a powerful vehicle for disseminating socialist and communist ideas across Europe and America. It established the theoretical foundations of revolutionary communism, moderate socialism, and anarchism as the three fundamental trends within the international workers' movement. It helped workers grasp that their emancipation was a "global objective" and that they had to achieve it "through their own capacity for organization".

The collapse of the International was a recognition that the era of nationally based socialist parties had begun. The destruction of the French working-class movement in the Paris Commune was a decisive factor, transferring the leadership of European socialism from France to Germany. Engels wrote in 1874 that the old International had outlived its usefulness, having accomplished the task of breaking the "simple harmony of all the factions" and preparing the ground for more theoretically mature and nationally consolidated parties. The experience of the IWA, particularly the lessons drawn from the Paris Commune and the struggle against anarchism, paved the way for the foundation of the Second International in 1889, which inherited its Marxist principles and continued its work on a new historical basis. In this sense, as Wilhelm Liebknecht declared at the founding congress of the Second International, the new body was "indeed the offspring of the International Workingmen’s Association.”

== See also ==
- Group of Narodnik Socialists
- The Internationale anthem
