= César De Paepe =

Belgian doctor and syndicalist (1841–1890)

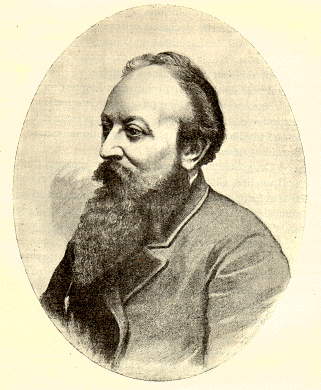
- Born: July 12, 1841; Ostend
- Died: December 19, 1890 (aged 49); Cannes
- Burial place: Brussels Cemetery
- Citizenship: Belgian
- Education: Free University of Brussels
- Occupations: Doctor, trade unionist, activist, politician, lawyer
- Political party: Belgian Labour Party
- Other political affiliations: International Workingmen's Association
- Movement: Freethought, socialism

César De Paepe (12 July 1841 in Ostend, Belgium – 1890 in Cannes, France) was a Belgian medical doctor, socialist activist and a prominent proponent of syndicalism whose work strongly influenced the Industrial Workers of the World and the syndicalist movement in general. Anticipating modern political philosophy, democracy according to de Paepe would inevitably spread to the economic segments of society and economic organizations: workplace democracy was inevitable. He graduated in medicine at the Free University of Brussels.

De Paepe was a leading member of the First International and was the principal leader of the Collectivist victory over the supporters of Proudhonian mutualism, like Henri Tolain, at the 1868 Brussels conference. Initially siding with the anti-Marxist side of the 1872 split, his subsequent debates with the anarchists of the Jura Federation such as Paul Brousse and Adhémar Schwitzguébel over the "Public Service Question" led him to defend the necessity of a workers' state to provide social services like a public health service.

At the end of 1877 De Paepe, Joseph Favre, Benoît Malon and Ippolito Perderzolli co-founded the review Le Socialisme progressif in Switzerland. Twenty three issues appeared between 7 January and 30 November 1878. Favre, Malon, Lodovico Nabruzzi and Tito Zanardelli had earlier founded the internationalist section of Lake Lugano. They rejected insurrection in favor of evolutionary solutions, and supported trade unions.

Because he flourished after The Communist Manifesto but before World War I, de Paepe's views are inevitably compared to those of Karl Marx. De Paepe was notably neutral on the question of a violent worker revolution by the proletariat. He thought it was possible, and maybe desirable in some countries, but that a slow gradual advancement of democratic values and norms in workplaces would have a pacifying effect and eventually make the methods by which the ruling class ruled obsolete: once everyone was a manager, management would lose mystique, just as once everyone could vote, political leadership had also.
