= Zanardelli =

Zanardelli is a surname. Notable people with the surname include:

- Giuseppe Zanardelli (1826–1903), Italian jurisconsult and politician, Grand Master of Italian Freemasonry
  - Zanardelli Code, the Italian Penal Code of 1889
  - Zanardelli Cabinet, Italian government from 15 February 1901 until 3 November 1903
- Tito Zanardelli (1848–?), Italian journalist and anarchist
- Fausto Zanardelli (born 1978), member of the Italian indie pop-hip hop musical duo Coma_Cose
