= La Plebe (newspaper) =

Italian newspaper

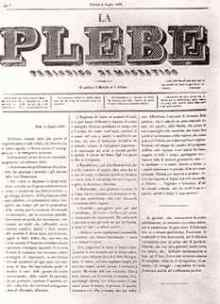
- Cover of the first issue, 4 July 1868
- Editor: Enrico Bignami
- Founded: 1868
- Political alignment: Socialist
- Language: Italian
- Ceased publication: 1883
- Headquarters: Lodi, Milan, Italy

La Plebe (The Worker) was an Italian newspaper that was published in Lodi from 1868 to 1875, then in Milan from 1875 to 1883. The editor was Enrico Bignami.

== Mazzinist journal ==
Enrico Bignami founded La Plebe in Lodi in 1868 to promoted Giuseppe Mazzini's ideas, financing the paper from his import business. The first issue appeared on 4 July 1868. At first it was published bi-weekly, although for periods during the years that followed it appeared more or less frequently. The paper would last until 1883, despite seizures of issues and several arrests of the editor. It gave continuity from the left wing of the Risorgimento to the post-unification labor movement and the later elaboration of socialist ideology in northern Italy.

Until the early 1870s La Plebe took a mainstream democratic position. However La Plebe was critical of the institutions ruling the new state of Italy, which it saw as opposed to the ideals of the Risorgimento.

On 11 August 1868, an article said "the papacy and the monarchy ... are bleeding specters still protesting against the enlightened thought which advances."

On 8 September 1868, Mazzini wrote in an article, "a people that has been enslaved for centuries to rotten powers .... does not rise as a nation without overthrowing those ghostly powers."

== Socialist journal ==
Bignami became enthusiastic about the 1871 Paris Commune, and from then the paper took a socialist line. In April 1872 La Plebe began to publish a series of letters from Friedrich Engels, which helped to stimulate circulation. This set of letters was suspended in early 1873 when the government took action against the paper. The former communard Benoît Malon contributed to the paper, and influenced it to take an anti-Bakunist position. A series of biographies of communards appeared in La Plebe between 1873 and 1876, written by authors such as Tito Zanardelli, Felice Cameroni, Giovanni La Cecilia and Amilcare Cipriani. These were often imaginative celebrations of the revolutionary acts in eulogic style. The paper also devoted considerable space to developments in the labor movement in Germany.

Bignami moved to Milan in 1875, taking the paper with him. The anarchist Carlo Cafiero briefly joined the editorial staff of La Plebe. In November 1875 Cafiero wrote an article in which he asserted that the times are never ripe for revolution – unless one is a true revolutionary. (Note: In April 1877 Cafiero, Errico Malatesta and others began an insurrection in the province of Benevento. They were arrested and held in prison for over a year before being brought to trial. They were eventually acquitted in August 1878. During his imprisonment Cafiero wrote his best-known work: A Compendium of Das Kapital, later published by La Plebe.) In November 1876 Bignami invited Osvaldo Gnocchi-Viani to move from Rome to Milan to work on the paper. That year Gnocchi-Viani and other evolutionist Socialists who wrote for La Plebe founded the Northern Italian Federation of the International, an organization that believed in using legal means and was opposed to anarchists and insurrectionists.

In May 1877 La Plebe published a manifesto by Bignami and Gnoocchi-Viani for the organization of the Socialist Party in Italy. Later that year at the September congress in Ghent the rift widened between the evolutionists led by Zanardelli and the Bakuninists who favored violent revolution. Bignami tried to organize a congress that would draw together the different factions, but did not succeed. La Plebe published further articles from Engels starting in 1877. In 1879 the paper reprinted some parts of Marx's Das Kapital. Cafiero's Compendium of Das Kapital was published in 1879 in Milan by La Plebe.

Starting in 1881 La Plebe became a monthly magazine. Gnocchi-Viani became a leading member of the Italian Workers Party (POI) founded in Milan in 1882, and was one of the drafters of the party's program. La Plebe played a central role in the formation of the party.

The paper stopped publication in 1883.
