= Osvaldo Gnocchi-Viani =

Italian politician and journalist (1837–1917)

- Born: 26 August 1837; Ostiglia, Mantua, Austrian Empire
- Died: 8 January 1917 (aged 79); Milan, Italy
- Occupations: Journalist, politician
- Known for: Chambers of labor

Osvaldo Gnocchi-Viani (26 August 1837 – 8 January 1917) was an Italian journalist and a member of the First International. Later he entered mainstream democratic politics as a Socialist. He is known for his work in introducing chambers of labor into Italy.

== Early years ==
Osvaldo Gnocchi-Viani was born in Ostiglia, Mantua, Austrian Empire on August 26, 1837. His parents were Giuseppe Gnocchi and Teresa Viani. He attended secondary school in Mantua, then was admitted to the faculty of law at the University of Padua. In 1859 he joined Giuseppe Mazzini's movement for Italian unification. He was prosecuted for taking part in an anti-Austrian demonstration and took refuge in Pavia, where he obtained a degree in law in March 1861.

Gnocchi-Viani became a journalist, and worked for the Mazzini papers L'Unità italiana (Italian Unity) and IlDovere di Genova (The Duty of Genoa). In 1863 he moved to Genoa. Between 1868 and 1870 he took over direction of IlDovere di Genova. Gnocchi-Viani's 1870 pamphlet Dal Concilio a Dio showed his growing independence from Mazzini's philosophical and religious views, and his adherence to materialistic concepts. In October 1870 he volunteered for the campaign in Vosges, France, as an officer in Giuseppe Garibaldi's forces.

== First International ==
Gnocchi-Viani became disillusioned with Mazzini when the latter would not support the Paris Commune, and disagreed with Mazzini's belief in cooperation between social classes. He became increasingly sympathetic with the International Workingmen's Association (IWA - often called the First International). In the summer of 1871 he settled in Rome, working as a proofreader at the Rechiedei printing house. He organized the 12th Workers' Congress, held in Rome in November 1871. In 1872 he founded the Workers' League of Crafts and Trades, affiliated to the IWA, and became the first secretary. In Rome in 1872 he worked with Tito Zanardelli in organization and in international propaganda.

In March 1873 Gnocchi-Viani made demands on behalf of the masons to the government of Rome. On 15 May 1873 the authorities arrested him and other IWA members, charging them with conspiracy against the security of the state. He was released on 8 August 1873. He found that the anarchists had taken control of the Roman IWA section, and decided to join the anti-Bakunin faction. In November 1876, he moved to Milan at the invitation of Enrico Bignami, director of La Plebe. That year he and other evolutionist Socialists who wrote for La Plebe founded the Northern Italian Federation of the International, an organization that believed in using legal means and was opposed to anarchists and insurrectionists. In his belief in gaining political power through elections he was at odds with anarchists such as Errico Malatesta, who said, "Gnocchi Viani cannot ignore that logic imposes other methods of struggle to those who want to abolish political power instead of occupying it."

== Later career ==
Gnocchi-Viani believed that history had to be seen as more than just a chronicle of events, but also as an account of ideas, schools, theories and doctrines. He was in favor of formation of labor unions and the right to strike. He was opposed to the middle-classes taking too active a role in the workers' movement. He believed that socialism should not just eliminate exploitation of man by man, but should seek broader goals, eliminating all forms of injustice. In this he disagreed with Karl Marx. Gnocchi-Viani criticized the Second International (1889–1916) and defended democracy as being essential to socialism.

Gnocchi-Viani became a leading member of the Italian Workers Party (POI) founded in Milan in 1882, and was one of the drafters of the party's program. He was the candidate for the POI in October 1882, but was not elected. At the end of 1885 Gnocchi-Viani went to France to study labor relations for the journal Il Sole. He was the guest of Benoît Malon, and learned about bourses du travail from him. He began to push for setting up Italian chambers of labor on the French model.

Gnocchi-Viani was elected to the Milan Chamber of Deputies on a left-wing platform in 1890. In 1991 he helped found the Milan chamber of labor. In 1892 Gnocchi-Viani was one of the founders of the Party of Italian Workers, later the Italian Socialist Party (PSI). In 1893 he was the first secretary of the Humanitarian Society of Milan, which aimed to improve the education and conditions of the working classes. In 1901 he and Angelo Filippetti, later to be mayor of Milan, created the Popular University of Milan, which aimed to educate adult workers.

Osvaldo Gnocchi-Viani died in Milan on 8 January 1917. His Dieci anni di camere del lavoro is an important source of the early history of the chamber of labor in Italy.

== Bibliography ==
A selection of publications:

- Gnocchi-Viani, Osvaldo (1865). Tradizioni storiche. Tipografia sociale.
- Gnocchi-Viani, Osvaldo (1874). La Comune Di Parigi E L'Internazionale. Avvenire Sociale.
- Gnocchi-Viani, Osvaldo (1882). Il nostro idea e. Estratto dalla Conferenza tenuta al Teatro Castelli, Milano, la sera del 27 ottobre 1882.
- Gnocchi-Viani, Osvaldo (1885). Il Partito operaio italiano, 1882-1885. Industriale di Stefani e Pizzi.
- Gnocchi-Viani, Osvaldo (1889). Le Borse del Lavoro. Panizza.
- Gnocchi-Viani, Osvaldo; Turati, Filippo (1892). Il socialismo e le sue scuole. Con introd. di F. Turati. Critica sociale.
- Gnocchi-Viani, Osvaldo (1893). L'Internazionale nella Comune di Parigi. Tip. Cooperativa.
- Gnocchi-Viani, Osvaldo; Cabrini, Angiolo (1893). Delle Camere del lavoro in Italia. Tipografia degli operai.
- Gnocchi-Viani, Osvaldo (1897). Le peripezie delle Camere del lavoro: conferenza. Spandre e Lazzari (tip.).
- Gnocchi-Viani, Osvaldo (1995). Dieci anni di Camere del Lavoro e altri scritti sul sindacato italiano: 1889-1899. Ediesse. ISBN 9788823001671.
- Osvaldo Gnocchi-Viani (1989). Oltre la politica: valori e istituzioni per una società nuova. Franco Angeli. ISBN 978-88-204-3433-5.
