= Louis Bignon =

French chef

- Louis Bignon
- Born: 26 June 1816; Hérisson, Allier department, France
- Died: 18 May 1906 (aged 89); Macau, Gironde department, France
- Occupation: Chef
- Known for: Café Riche

Louis Bignon (26 June 1816 – 18 May 1906) was a famous French chef whose Café Riche became the most fashionable in Paris. He was also a noted agriculturalist, won prizes for his products and was awarded the Legion of Honour.

== Early years ==
Louis Bignon was born on 26 June 1816 in Hérisson in the Allier department. He began work in Paris in the kitchen of the Ministry of Foreign Affairs in the Quai d'Orsay. Later he was a waiter at "La Minerve" at the corner of the rue Montpensier. He apprenticed as a cook in various fashionable restaurants.

In 1843 Bignon acquired and reorganized the Café Foy. In a few years he had made it a leading center of gastronomy. The Café Foy, which later became the Paillard, was at the corner of the Rue de la Chaussée-d'Antin and the Boulevard des Italiens. In 1847 Bignon handed over the Café Foy to his brother, who had recently married one of the directors of Les Freres Provencaux, another leading Parisian restaurant.

== Café Riche ==
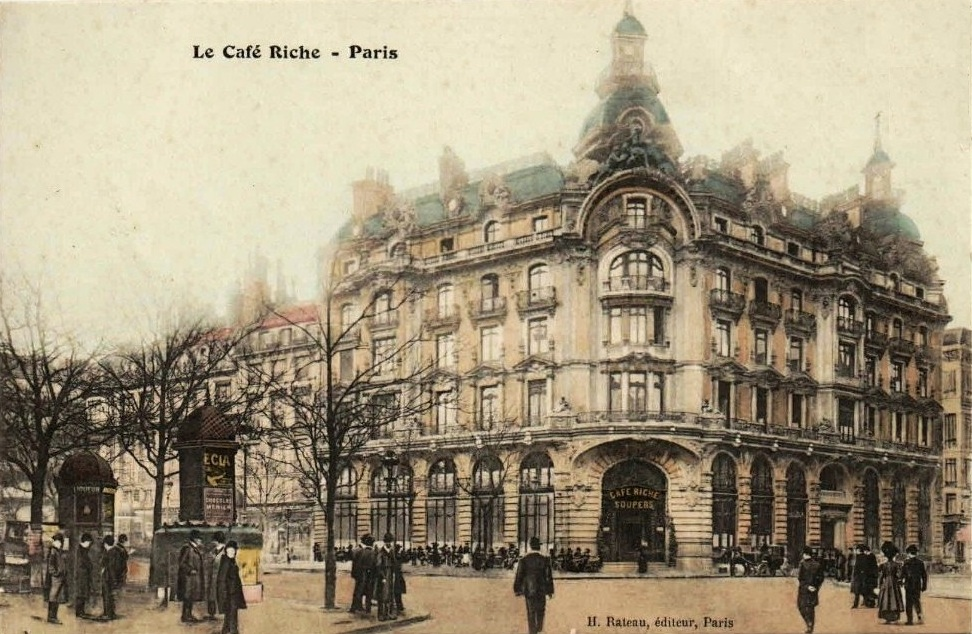
Café Riche, postcard around 1890

Bignon then bought the Café Riche, which had become run down, for the huge sum of one million francs. It soon became the most fashionable restaurant in Paris. It was frequented by leading figures of French society, and by great artists and writers. Some splendid dishes were first created at the Café Riche, including Sole à la Riche and Bécasse à la Riche. Alexandre Dumas was a frequent visitor, and used many of Bignon's recipes in his Petit dictionnaire de cuisine. Bignon was succeeded as chef by Vauquelin, Fèvre and Seroulle. Their names were engraved on a plaque. Joseph Favre, later to become a famous chef in his own right, apprenticed at the Café Riche around 1869.

Louis Bignon was a pioneer in hygiene, and made this an important consideration in the design and operation of the kitchens of the Café Riche. Bignon took care to stock his cellars with the best wines in the world. He said that all his wines were pure, and were each the best of their type. He had never served a wine under a false name. Bignon kept his prices high. When questioned about this, he said that it was in the interests of his clientele, since the high prices kept out the vulgar and ensured an atmosphere of quiet intimacy.

== Agriculturalist ==
Bignon invested in farms and vineyards in his native Allier, and took an active part in the fight against phylloxera, which destroyed many of the French vineyards from 1863. Louis Bignon was a founding member of the Société des agriculteurs de France, a corresponding member of the Société impériale et centrale d'agriculture de France (later the Societe Nationale d'Agriculture), and a member of the Conseil supérior de l'agriculture, du commerce et de l'industrie. He received high awards for his wines and agricultural products at the world exhibitions in London and Paris between 1862 and 1880. In 1867 he was awarded the Legion of Honour for his agricultural work.

Louis Bignon retired at the end of the century and died some time later. The "Café Riche" closed in 1916 and was demolished to make way for a bank.
