= Hérisson =

- Commune
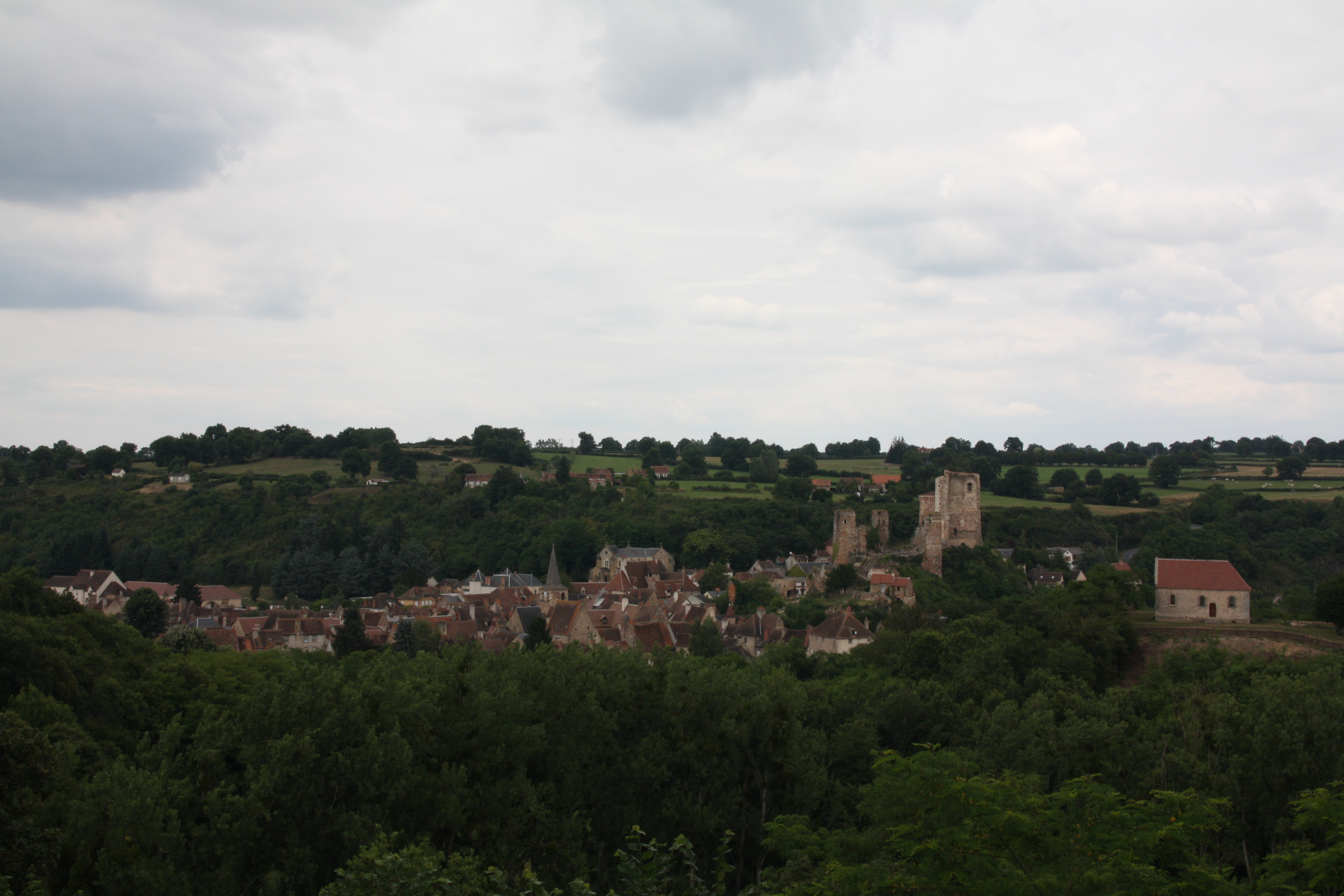
- A general view of Hérisson

- Coat of arms
- Location of Hérisson
- Location within France Location within Auvergne-Rhône-Alpes
- Coordinates: 46°30′34″N 2°42′44″E
- Country: France
- Region: Auvergne-Rhône-Alpes
- Department: Allier
- Arrondissement: Montluçon
- Canton: Huriel
- Intercommunality: CC du Pays de Tronçais

Government
  - Mayor (2026–32): Stéphanie Cusin-Panit
- Area^{1}: 32.57 km^{2} (12.58 sq mi)
- Elevation: 199 m (653 ft)
- Highest elevation: 327 m (1,073 ft)
- Lowest elevation: 177 m (581 ft)
- Population (2023): 555
  - Density: 17.0/km^{2} (44.1/sq mi)
- Time zone: UTC+01:00 (CET)
  - Summer (DST): UTC+02:00 (CEST)
- INSEE/Postal code: 03127 /03190
- ^{1} French Land Register data, which excludes lakes, ponds, glaciers > 1 km^{2} (0.386 sq mi or 247 acres) and river estuaries.

Hérisson (French pronunciation: [eʁisɔ̃]; Occitan: Eiriçon) is a town in the Allier department in central France.

== Population ==
Historical population
Year	Pop.	±% p.a.
1968	1,043	—
1975	979	−0.90%
1982	872	−1.64%
1990	801	−1.06%
1999	709	−1.35%
2007	680	−0.52%
2012	636	−1.33%
2017	622	−0.44%
2023	555	−1.88%
Source: INSEE

== Notable people ==
- Henri Harpignies (28 June 1819 – 28 August 1916), 19th century painter of the Barbizon school who made many pictures of Hérisson and the surroundings.
- Louis Bignon (26 June 1816 - 18 May 1906), restaurateur, who made the Café Riche the most fashionable in Paris.
- Olivier Perrier (born 15 September 1940), actor, codirector of the "Théâtre des Fédérés".

== Gallery ==
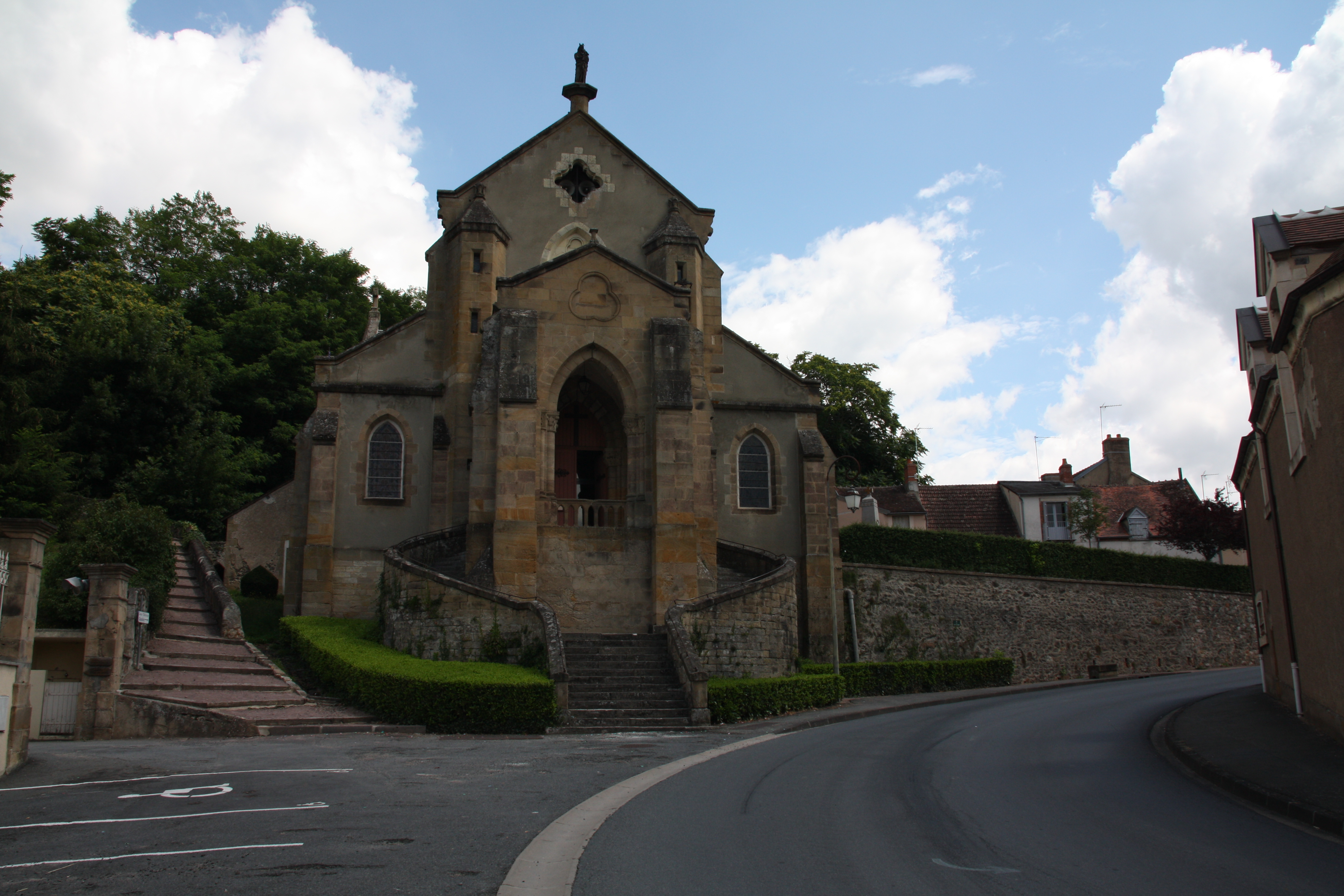
Church of Notre-Dame

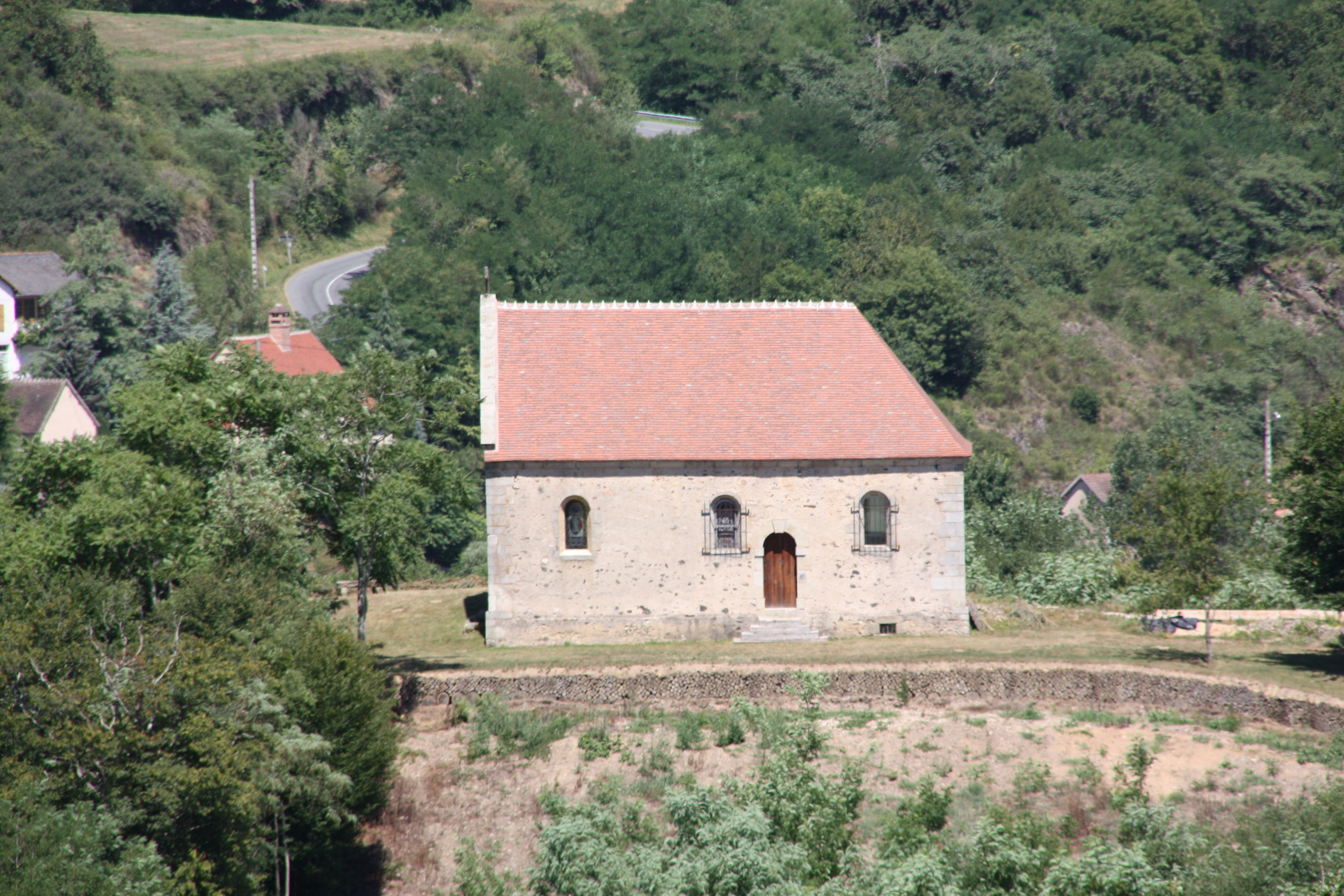
Chapelle du Calvaire

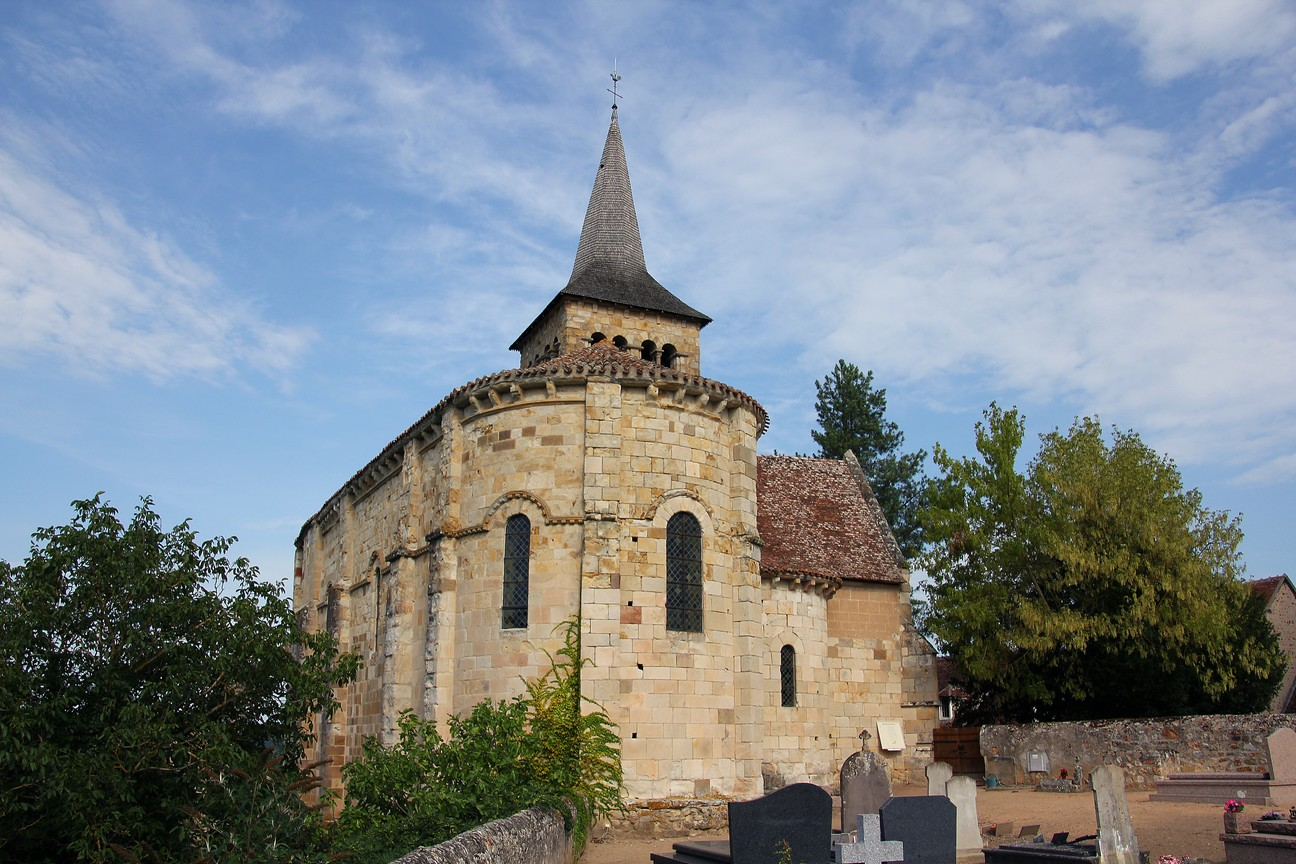
Église de Châteloy
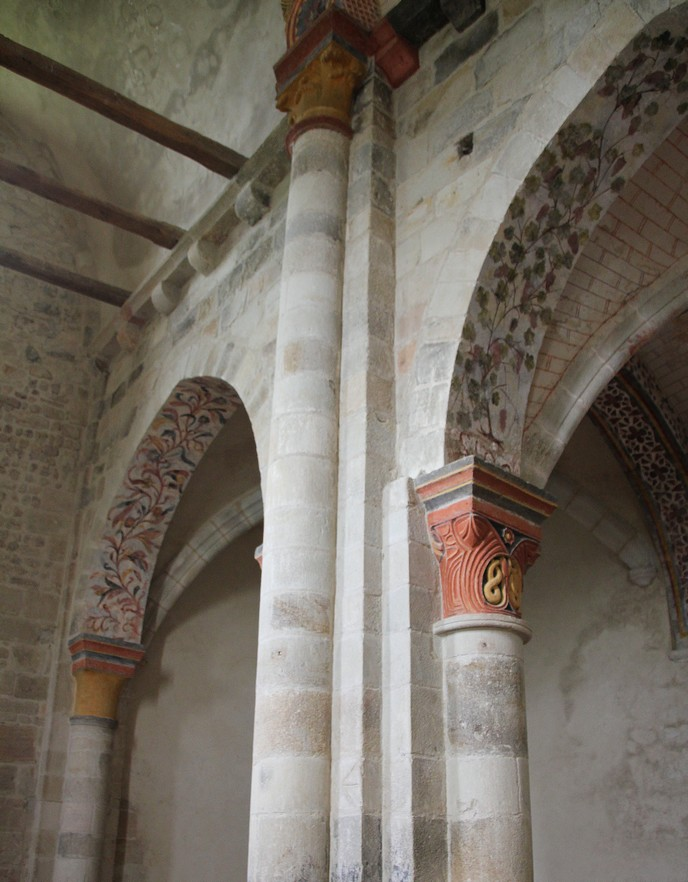
Église de Châteloy: Interior

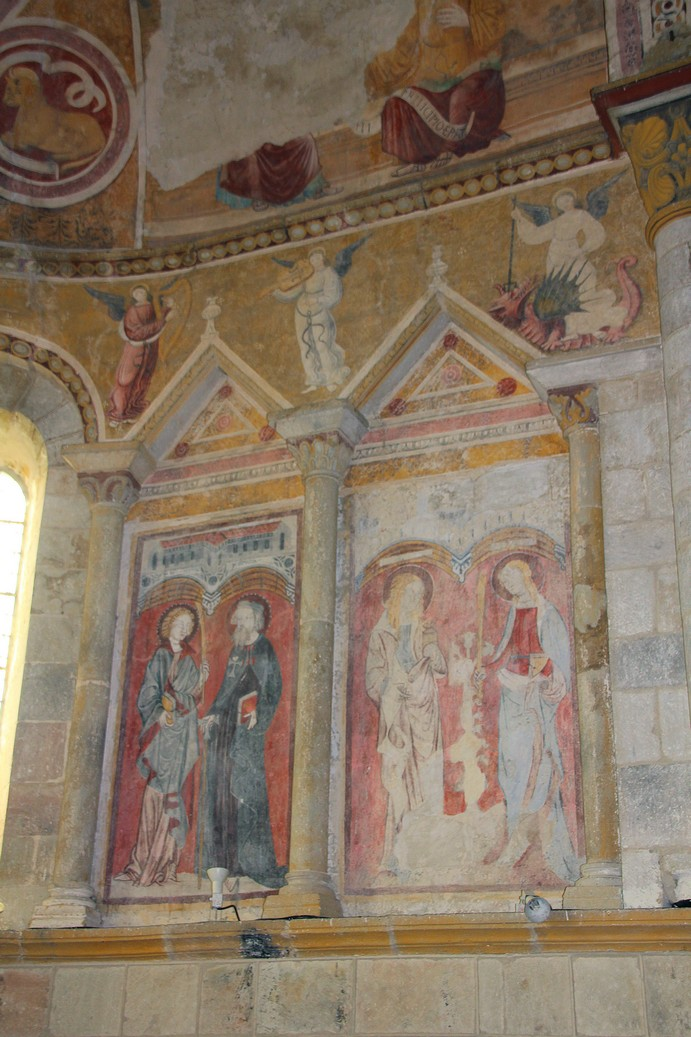
Église de Châteloy: Fresco

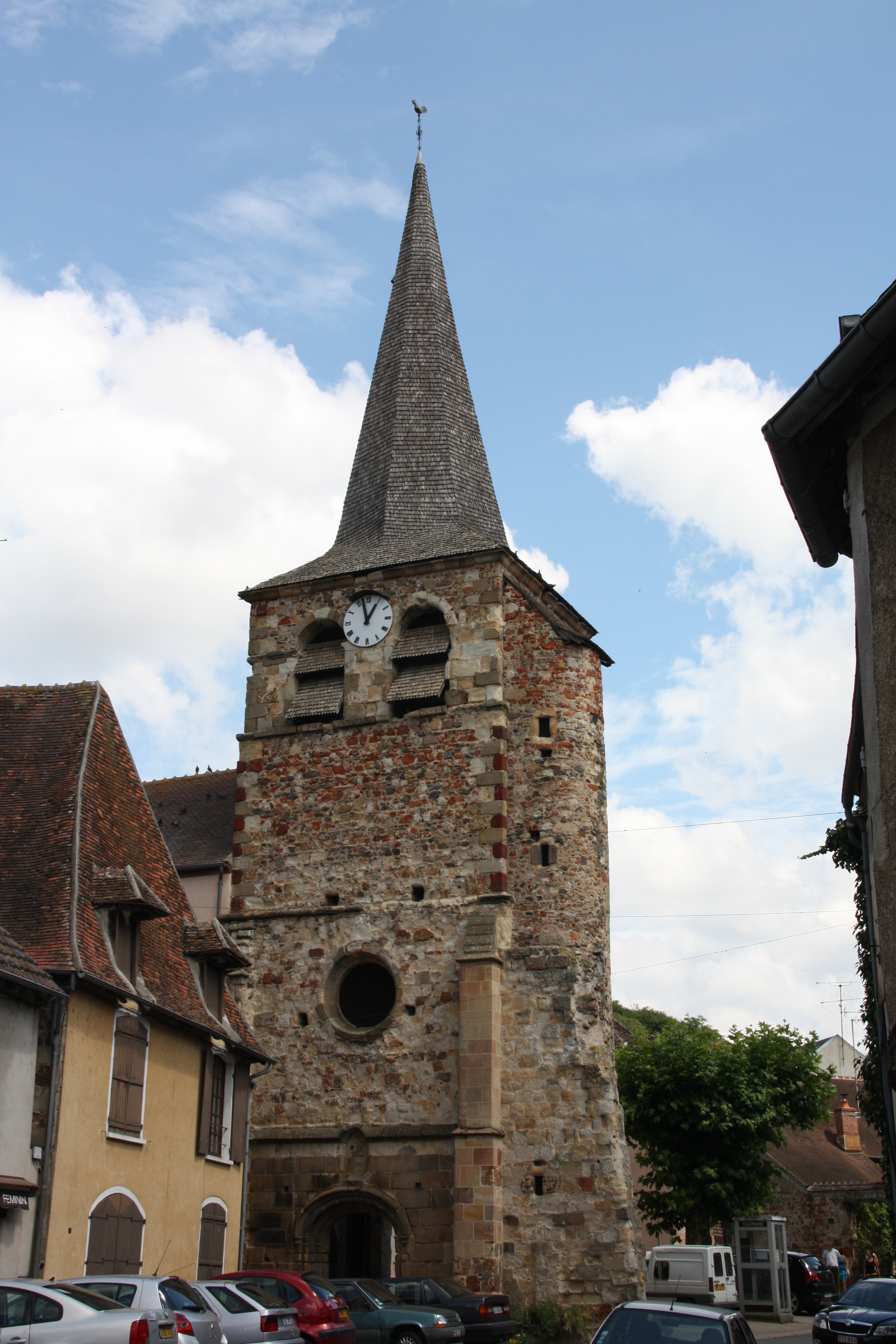
Old church of église Saint-Sauveur

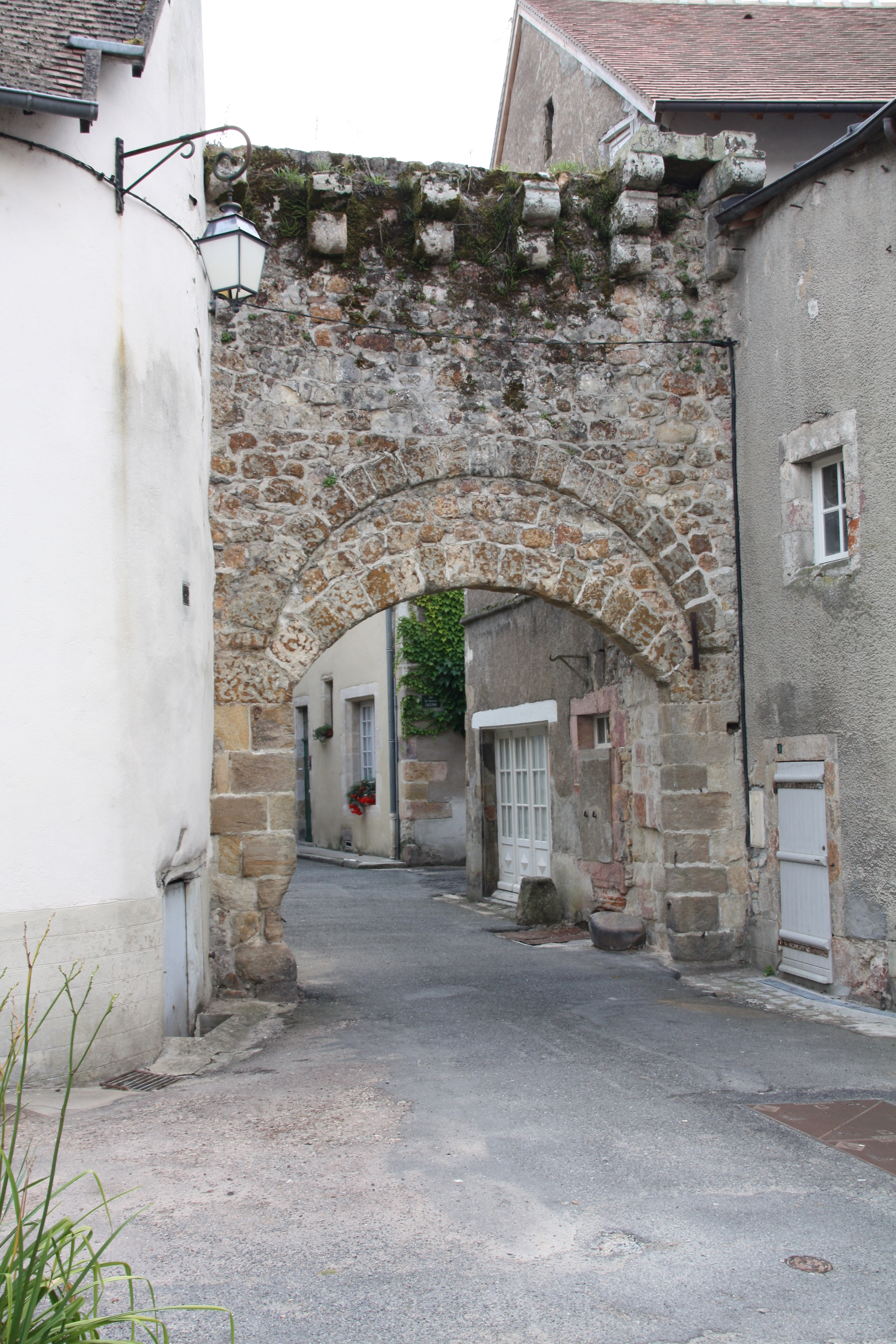
Porte de Varenne

== See also ==
- Communes of the Allier department
