= Enrico Bignami =

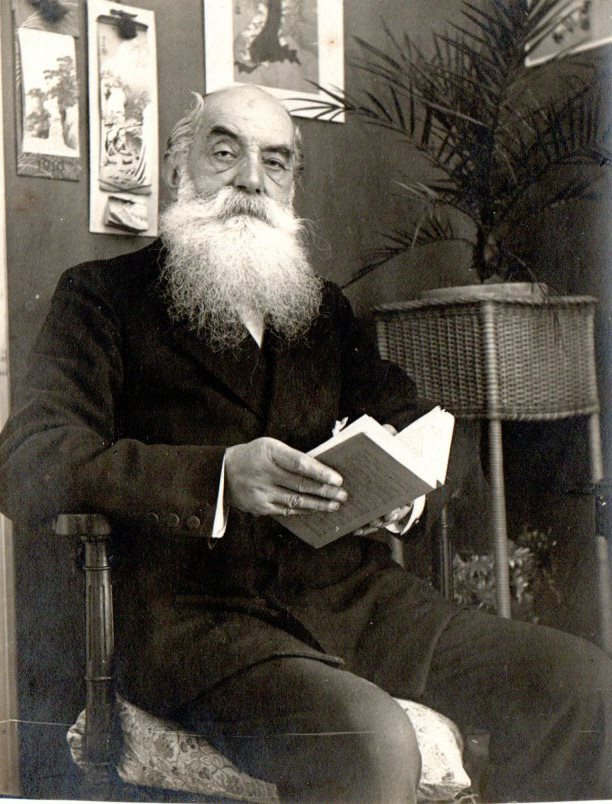
- Born: 3 December 1844; Lodi, Lombardy, Austrian Empire
- Died: 13 October 1921 (aged 76); Lugano, Switzerland
- Occupations: Journalist, politician
- Known for: La Plebe

Enrico Bignami was an Italian merchant, and the editor of La Plebe, a socialist newspaper.

Enrico Bignami was born in Lodi, Lombardy, on 3 December 1844. He came from a poor family. In 1866 and 1867 he fought with Giuseppe Garibaldi. He founded La Plebe in Lodi in 1868 to promote Giuseppe Mazzini's ideas, financing the paper from his import business. The first issue appeared on 4 July 1868. At first, it was published bi-weekly, although during the following years, it appeared more or less frequently. The paper would last until 1883, despite seizures of issues and several arrests of the editor. It gave continuity from the left wing of the Risorgimento to the post-unification labour movement and the later elaboration of socialist ideology in northern Italy.

Until the early 1870s La Plebe took a mainstream democratic position. However La Plebe was critical of the institutions ruling the new state of Italy, which it saw as opposed to the ideals of the Risorgimento. Bignami became enthusiastic about the 1871 Paris Commune, and from then the paper took a socialist line. Bignami moved to Milan in 1875, taking the paper with him. He helped to found a number of worker's leagues in the years that followed, and in 1876 was one of the founders of the North Italy Federation of the International. He became a close friend of Osvaldo Gnocchi-Viani. At several times, particularly in 1879-80, he tried to organize a congress at which all left-wing democratic and socialist movements would be united, but he did not succeed.

La Plebe played a central role in the formation of the Italian Workers Party (POI) in Milan in 1882. La Plebe stopped publication in 1883. In the late 1880s Bignami was a promoter of establishing the Milan Chamber of Labor. He founded the socialist publishing house Biblioteca socialista in 1895. In 1898 he moved to Lugano in Switzerland to avoid being arrested. From 1906 to 1918 he edited Coenobium (Common Life).

Bignami died in Lugano on 13 October 1921. He was Grand Master of the regular Scottish Rite Masonic Lodge "Lincoln" of Lodi, affiliated to the Grand Orient of Italy.
