= Zéphyrin Camélinat =

French socialist (1840–1932)

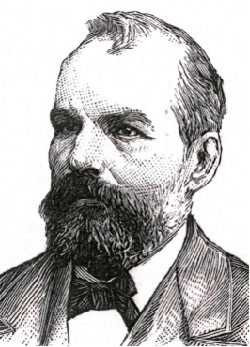
Camélinat in 1885

Zéphyrin Camélinat (variously spelled Zéphirin, Zéphyrenne; 5 March 1840 in Mailly-la-Ville, Yonne – 14 September 1932 in Paris) was a French politician, communard, socialist and communist.

== Biography ==
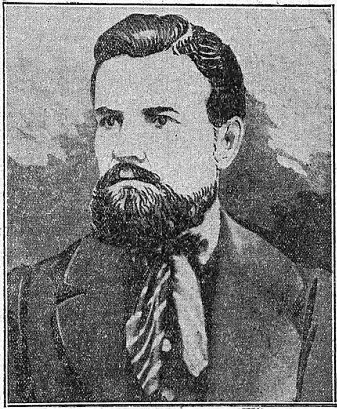
Z. Camélinat in 1864

Zéphyrin Rémy Camélinat was born into a poor peasant family and became a metal worker by trade. He was a friend of the anarchist writer and social critic P.-J. Proudhon. In 1864, Camélinat was one of the signatories of the 'Manifesto of the Sixty', together with Henri Tolain and other Proudhonists. It abandoned political abstentionism and called for elections of workers to the National Assembly, and for the establishment of economic as well as political democracy.

Camélinat was instrumental in organising the French section of the First International and recruited Benoît Malon, among others. In 1871 Camélinat participated in the Paris Commune, serving as its treasurer. After the suppression of the Commune, he fled to England, where he remained until a general amnesty enabled him to return to France in 1880. From 1885 to 1889 he was a Socialist deputy in the Chamber of Deputies. Soon after the 1885 session opened Antide Boyer, Émile Basly, Camélinat and others formed the "workers' group", a small socialist group independent of the extreme left. The members of the workers' group summarized their demands in a manifesto on 12 March 1886:

Our intervention will deal with questions already clarified by conscientious studies for which the solution is unanimously recognized by the interested parties as urgent. We will demand: national and international labor legislation; repeal of the law against the International Workingmen's Association; recognition of the right of the child to full development of his mind and body by regulation of work; social guarantee against unemployment, sickness, accidents and old age; reorganization, on a more equitable basis, of industrial tribunals; independence guaranteed to miners' delegates and the improvement of the seamen's lot; removal of the monopolies which have delivered a large part of the national domain to private enterprises; organization of credit at work and all necessary modifications to the social interest in public works, industry, agriculture, ...

Camélinat defended compensation for work accidents, social assistance for the disabled, limiting child labor, separation of church and state and free justice. He was involved in the unification of the French Socialist party (SFIO) in 1905.

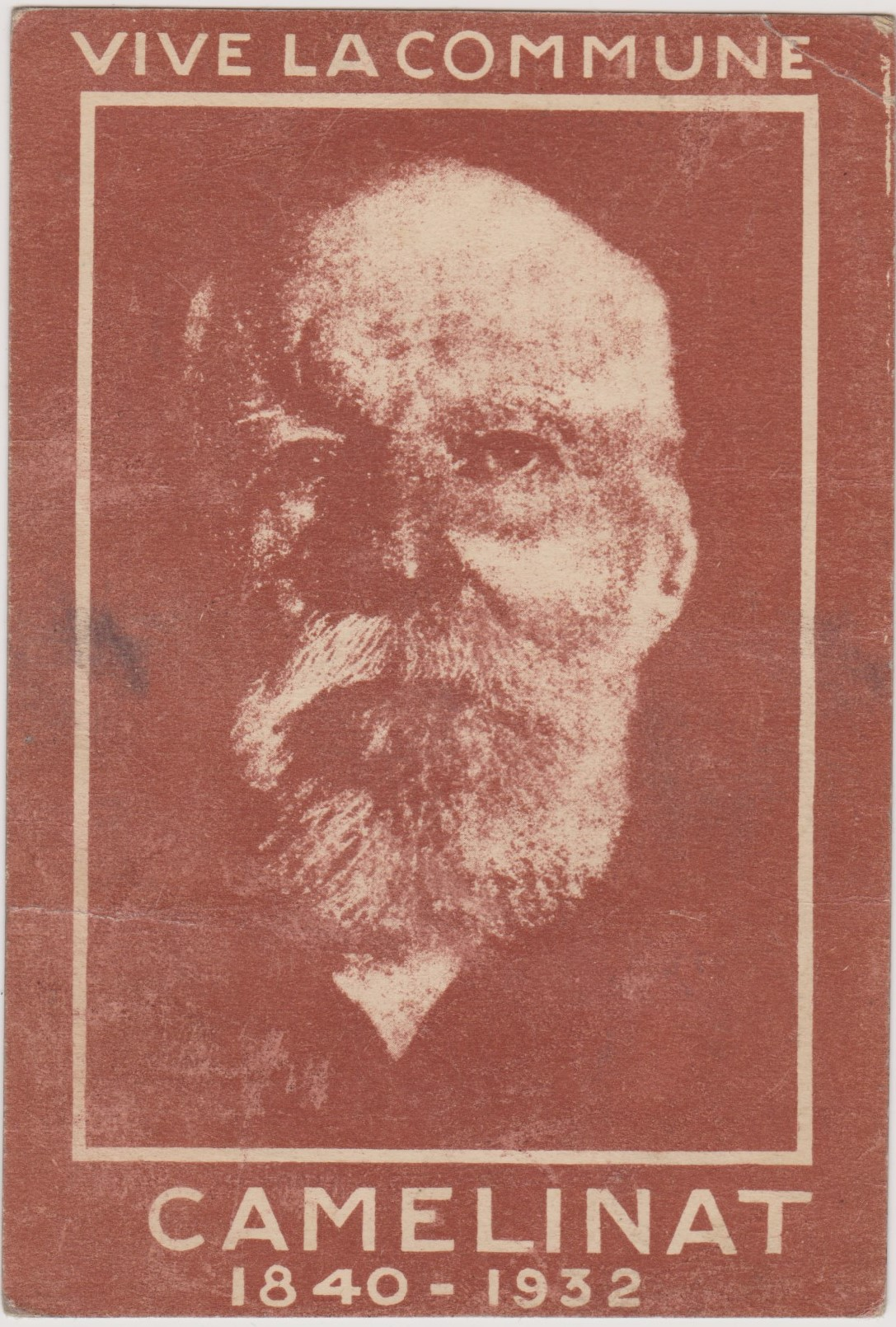
Postcard of the French Communist Party for Camélinat after his death

During the First World War, Camélinat moved increasingly to the left of the Socialist Party and came to oppose its pro-war stance. In 1920 he became a founding member of the new French Communist Party (PCF), serving as its first presidential candidate in the French presidential election of 1924.

Camélinat died on 14 September 1931, aged 91. His funeral was organized by FCP and according to L'Humanité, it was attending by over 120,000 workers.

== Sources ==
- Bruno Fuligni, La France rouge. Un siècle d’histoire dans les archives du PCF, Les Arènes, 2011
- Robert, Adolphe; Cougny, Gaston (1889–1891), "BOYER (ANTIDE)", Dictionnaire des parlementaires français de 1789 à 1889 (in French), Edgar Bourloton
- The Great Soviet Encyclopedia. Moscow, 1979.
