= Émile Basly =

Émile Joseph Basly
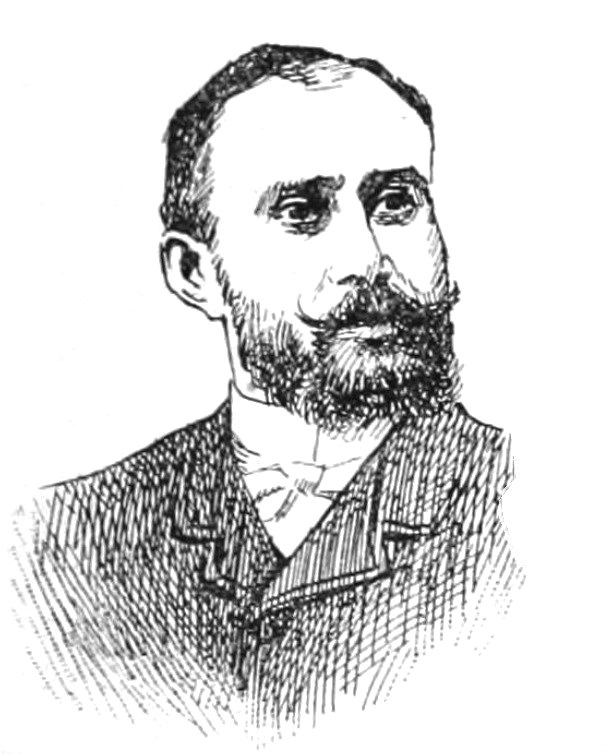
- Basly from Le Monde moderne, December 1898

Deputy for Pas-de-Calais
- In office 4 October 1885 – 11 February 1928

Personal details
- Born: 29 March 1854 Valenciennes, Nord, France
- Died: 11 February 1928 (aged 73) Lens, Pas-de-Calais, France
- Occupation: Miner, labour leader, politician

Émile Basly (29 March 1854 – 11 February 1928) is one of the great figures of trade unionism in mining in the mineral field of Nord-Pas-de-Calais, France, along with Arthur Lamendin. He is primarily known for his participation in the strike of 1884, when he became known as "the untameable miner" and "the tsar of Lens". He was the inspiration for the character Etienne Lantier in Émile Zola's novel Germinal.

== Early years ==
Émile Joseph Basly was born on 29 March 1854 in Valenciennes, Nord. Basly entered mining as a galibot (minor) at the age of twelve. He was one of the leaders of the 1880 strike at the Compagnie des mines d'Anzin, which led to the creation in 1883 of the Union of Miners (Syndicat des ouvriers mineurs), of which Basly became general secretary. After the creation of the Trade union of the minors of Anzin in 1882, Basly became its secretary, and subsequently its president in 1891. He was delegate for the miners of Nord to the 1883 miners' congress in Saint-Étienne, where he vigorously supported their demands.

Another strike began at Anzin in February 1884 after 140 workers, mostly union members, were dismissed. The company called in troops to defend the mines, and refused to make any concessions. The strike lasted 56 days, and was headline news in France, but failed completely. During this strike Basly emerged as a leader of the miners. He became secretary general of the Nord miners' union, president of the Pas-de-Calais miners' union. During the 1884 Anzin strike he came to Paris to defend the miners' grievances and demands before the Parliamentary Committee established to examine the strike. He spoke in several public meetings, and became well known in the press for his strong socialist views.

== National deputy ==
Basly was elected deputy for Pas-de-Calais on 4 October 1885. Soon after the 1885 session opened Antide Boyer, Émile Basly, Zéphyrin Camélinat and others formed the "workers' group", a small socialist group independent of the extreme left. The members of the workers' group summarized their demands in a manifesto on 12 March 1886:

Our intervention will deal with questions already clarified by conscientious studies for which the solution is unanimously recognized by the interested parties as urgent. We will demand: national and international labor legislation; repeal of the law against the International Workingmen's Association; recognition of the right of the child to full development of his mind and body by regulation of work; social guarantee against unemployment, sickness, accidents and old age; reorganization, on a more equitable basis, of industrial tribunals; independence guaranteed to miners' delegates and the improvement of the seamen's lot; removal of the monopolies which have delivered a large part of the national domain to private enterprises; organization of credit at work and all necessary modifications to the social interest in public works, industry, agriculture, ...

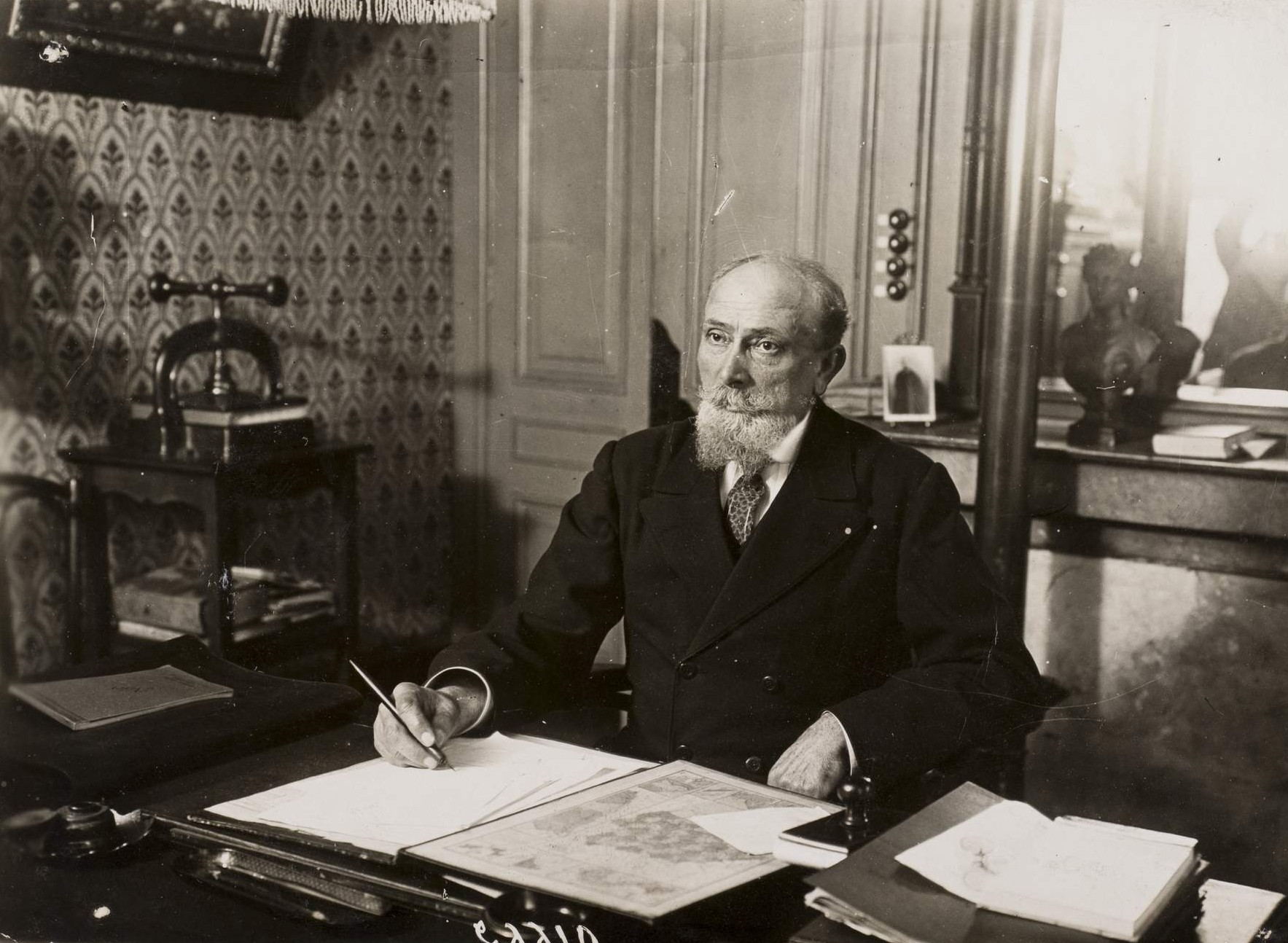
Basly as deputy-mayor of Lens, early 20th Century.

Basly was reelected as Deputy for Pas-de-Calais on 22 February 1891, 20 August 1893, 8 May 1898, 27 April 1902, 6 May 1906, 24 April 1910, 26 April 1914, 16 November 1919 and 11 May 1924, holding office until his death on 11 February 1928. Basly became mayor of Lens in 1900, and devoted the last ten years of his life to rebuilding the city, which had been completely destroyed during First World War. He continued to serve as mayor until his death there in 1928. Émile Basly died on 11 February 1928 in Lens, Nord. Rue Émile Basly is a street in Avion, named in his honor.

== Sources ==
- Emile, Joseph Basly (in French), Assemblée nationale
- Leroy, Jean-François (2002-02-08). "Émile Basly". Nordmag (in French).
- "Les trois âges de la mine". Bulletin de Liaison des Professeurs d'Histoire-Géographie de l'Académie de Reims (in French) (27). 2002.
- Robert, Adolphe; Cougny, Gaston (1889–1891), "BASLY (ÉMILE JOSEPH)", Dictionnaire des parlementaires français de 1789 à 1889 (in French), Edgar Bourloton
- Robert, Adolphe; Cougny, Gaston (1889–1891b), "BOYER (ANTIDE)", Dictionnaire des parlementaires français de 1789 à 1889 (in French), Edgar Bourloton
