= Lodovico Nabruzzi =

Italian anarchist journalist (1846–1916)

- Born: 27 June 1846; Ravenna, Italy
- Died: 12 February 1916 (aged 69); Ravenna, Italy
- Occupation: Journalist
- Known for: Anarchism

Lodovico Nabruzzi (25 June 1846 – 12 February 1916) was an Italian journalist and anarchist. He played a leading role in the dissensions between the revolutionary and evolutionary Italian socialists. He spent several years in exile in Switzerland and France, often forced to undertake menial work and often in trouble with the authorities. After returning to Italy his life continued to be difficult, and he suffered from mental health problems. Although he married and had four children the marriage did not last. He died alone in a public hospital.

== Early years ==
Lodovico Nabruzzi was born in Ravenna on 27 June 1846, the son of Ettore Nabruzzi and Clotilde Rossi. He came from a middle-class family. He took the name of his grandfather, who had been a municipal engineer and architect. His family included an 18th-century bishop of Molise, Antonio Lucci. He graduated from the municipal high school in 1866, and at the end of that year passed the entrance exam to enroll in the University of Bologna to study jurisprudence.

== Activist (1867-1873) ==
In 1867 Nabruzzi became secretary of the governing council of the Republican Democratic Union of Ravenna. From 1868 to 1870 he worked on this organization's paper Il Romagnolo, while also studying at university and obtaining excellent results. However, he did not graduate, perhaps for political reasons. The paper closed down when Nabruzzi and others on the staff left to defend the Paris Commune. It resumed publication in June 1871, and Nabruzzi was in charge for a few months. The paper was now oriented to the ideals of the commune. The editors called themselves "communists and internationalists" and rejected the authority of Giuseppe Mazzini.

As a socialist, Nabruzzi now engaged in often violent disputes with the followers of Mazzini. Garibaldi was still respected by socialists elsewhere in Italy, but it was only in the Romagna that his leadership was seen as essential for a people's republic. At first Lodovico Nabruzzi shared this view with Celso Ceretti and Paride Suzzara Verdi. Towards the end of 1871 Nabruzzi wrote to Friedrich Engels, saying conditions were ripe for revolution, particularly in the Romagna. However, Nabruzzi became a follower of Mikhail Bakunin. In January 1872 Bakunin wrote to him saying that the Romagna, with its landless peasants, was the ideal place for an anarchist revolt. In a series of letters Bakunin undermined Marx, with his authoritative tendencies, and Garibaldi and Mazzini with their lack of true socialist convictions.

Garibaldi had planned to call a democratic congress, but cancelled it due to the factional squabbles. With Bakunin's support, Nabruzzi, Ceretti, Andrea Costa and others arranged a conference in Bologna on 17 March 1872 where most of the internationalist sections of Romagna were represented. The congress rejected Mazzini's view that the question of social reform could follow creation of a republic, and also voted against participating in elections, in effect moving towards Bakunin's position. In June 1872 Nabruzzi went to Lucarno to meet Bakunin. A conference of all Italian sections of the International Workingmen's Association (IWA - often called the First International) was held in Rimini on 4–6 August 1872. Nabruzzi was elected vice-president of the Congress. In September 1872 he again met Bakunin, now in Zürich, where he became affiliated with the International Association of Revolutionary Socialists. He participated in the IWA conference in Saint-Imier in which the anarchists broke away from Karl Marx and the General Council in London. He moved to Bologna in the fall of 1872. In March 1873 there was a wave of arrests when delegates arrived for a conference in Mirandola, but he was not included.

== Exile ==
In September and October 1873 Nabruzzi took refuge in Locarno with his mother and a girl whom Bakunin called "very hard to classify". The climate back in Bologna was increasingly difficult, with many internationalists arrested and jailed, including Nabruzzi's brother. Nabruzzi moved to Lugano where he found work as a writer in a commercial agency, then as editor of Il Repubblicano. With Tito Zanardelli he was one of the main editors of the Agitatore.

Encouraged by Benoît Malon, Zanardelli and Nabruzzi published their Almanacco del proletario per l'anno 1876 in which they criticized the 1874 insurrection. In 1875, he and Tito Zanardelli published a guide to the three capitals of the Ticino canton. He was joined by his brother, who got a job at the Hôtel du Parc, where Joseph Favre was the chef. He distanced himself from Bakunin and Carlo Cafiero. In November 1875 Nabruzzi, Zanardelli and Favre, along with Benoît Malon, founded the internationalist section of Lake Lugano. They rejected insurrection in favor of evolutionary solutions, and supported trade unions.

A conservative government was installing in Ticino between the end of 1876 and start of 1877. Nabruzzi and his brother were dismissed from the staff of Il Repubblicano. In 1877 Nabruzzi went to France, where he and Zanardelli found work in a dry cleaners. The next year he was arrested along with Andrea Costa and Anna Kuliscioff after a demonstration to commemorate the Paris commune, and was expelled from the country. He moved to Geneva, then returned secretly to Paris. In December 1880 he participated in the Congress of Chiasso with a manifesto written by Zanardelli and suggested by Amilcare Cipriani in which they returned to their former position of promoting insurrection in Italy. Nabruzzi was arrested again in Paris, and in April 1881 went to Geneva and then to Italy.

== Later years ==
In Ravenna Nabruzzi worked as a writer and sometimes as a part-time municipal employee, and again moved in anarchist circles. In 1886 the authorities refused to grant him permission to stage a rally in support of Cipriani. In 1887 he signed a manifesto advocating revolutionary action. He continued to be active at meetings and conferences, distributing pamphlets and newspapers, and at times getting in trouble with the law.

He married Amalia Frignani, many years younger than him, and they had four children. After his uncle Francesco died, in 1886 he had to stand trial for threatening his uncle's executor and accusing him of fraud. The court recognized that Nabruzzi was not just plagued by financial distress, but from a disease that made him impressionable and inclined to do strange things. In 1908, separated from his wife, he obtained a passport for America and moved to Genoa. He was admitted to hospital there. He was discharged at the end of 1912 and returned to Ravenna, where he took a room in an inn. Lodovico Nabruzzi died in Ravenna in the public hospital on 12 February 1916 aged 69.
