= Antide Boyer =

French manual worker, Provençal dialect writer and journalist

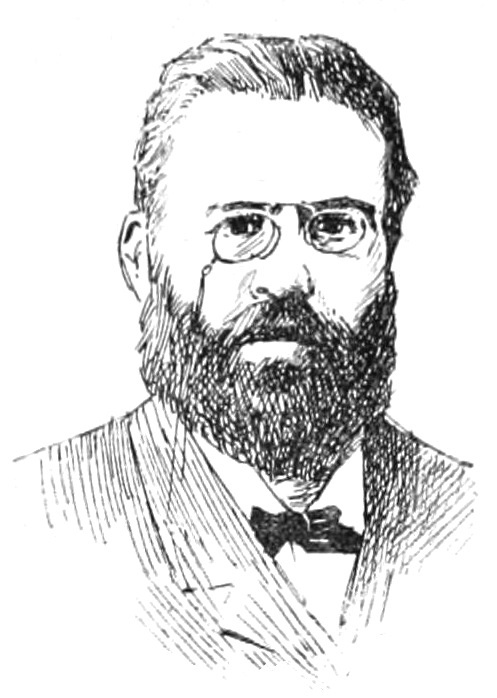
- Antide Boyer: Le Monde moderne (December 1898)

Deputy for Bouches-du-Rhône
- In office 18 October 1885 – 25 January 1909

Senator for Bouches-du-Rhône
- In office 1 January 1909 – 1 January 1912

Personal details
- Born: Antoine Jean-Baptiste Boyer; 26 October 1850 Aubagne, France
- Died: 24 July 1918 (aged 67) Marseille, France
- Occupation: Railway worker, politician

Antide Boyer (26 October 1850 – 24 July 1918) was a French manual worker, Provençal dialect writer and journalist from the south of France who became a socialist deputy. He supported strikes and was involved in the fight for workers' rights around the turn of the 19th century. He participated as a volunteer in the Greco-Turkish War of 1897.

== Early years ==
Antoine Jean-Baptiste Boyer (later known as Antide (Note: Antide: Anti-Dieu (Anti-God).) Boyer) was born on 26 October 1850 in Aubagne, Bouches-du-Rhône. As a child, he helped his father, a potter. He spent four years at the minor seminary of Marseille, where he lost his faith in Christianity. He met Pierre Mazière at the seminary, who later wrote under the nom-de-plume Peire Simoun. He worked for the Chemins de fer de Paris à Lyon et à la Méditerranée (PLM), then at the La Ciotat shipyards, and then ran a wholesale oil and soap store with his first wife. He was one of the founders of the Bouches-du-Rhone Socialist Party.

Boyer contributed to various local left-wing newspapers while editing Lou Tron de l'er. As editor-in-chief of Lou Tron de l'er from issue 26 (30 June 1877) he fought with the Félibrige, rejecting their spelling and saying their language was artificial. He called it a society of mutual admiration, and mocked its ceremonies. The mockery ended with the disappearance of Prouvençau, and he was on good terms with Guitton-Talamel's Lou Brusc. Boyer wrote for Provençal dialect publications under no less than 37 noms de plume. In 1884 he became deputy mayor of Marseille. From 1888 to 1892 he was Mayor of Aubagne.

== Deputy ==
In the 18 October 1885 legislative elections Boyer ran as a socialist on the radical list, and was elected Deputy of Bouches-du-Rhône, the last of the list. Although there more than 35,000 votes for the Socialist-Radical list in Bouches-du-Rhône, only Clovis Hugues and Antide Boyer could be called socialists. Soon after the session opened Boyer, Émile Basly, Zéphyrin Camélinat and others formed the "workers' group", a small socialist group independent of the extreme left. The members of the workers' group summarized their demands in a manifesto on 12 March 1886:

Our intervention will deal with questions already clarified by conscientious studies for which the solution is unanimously recognized by the interested parties as urgent. We will demand: national and international labor legislation; repeal of the law against the International Workers' Association; recognition of the right of the child to full development of his mind and body by regulation of work; social guarantee against unemployment, sickness, accidents and old age; reorganization, on a more equitable basis, of industrial tribunals; independence guaranteed to miners' delegates and the improvement of the seamen's lot; removal of the monopolies which have delivered a large part of the national domain to private enterprises; organization of credit at work and all necessary modifications to the social interest in public works, industry, agriculture, ...

A strike began on 26 January 1886 in Decazeville, Aveyron, among the workers of the Société des Houllères et Fonderies de l'Aveyron. It lasted 108 days and drew national attention. The engineer Watrin was thrown out of a window and died. Duc-Quercy went to Decazeville to support the strike and to draw national attention to the social issues in his Cri de peuple. Ernest Roche also went, as did the socialist politicians Zéphyrin Camélinat, Clovis Hugues and Antide Boyer. Duc-Quercy and Ernest Roche were charged by the police. In the session on 11 February 1886 Boyer strongly supported the interpellation by Basly, Camélinat on the government's attitude to the Decazeville strike and the proposals from the workers' group.

Boyer, with Camélinat and Clovis Hugues, proposed to revoke the railway tariff agreements and if necessary to revoke the railway concessions. On 27 November 1886 he voted for suppression of the Vatican Embassy. On 2 December 1886 he voted for the Colfavru amendment to abolish sub-prefects. At the start of 1887 he proposed the suppression of permanent armies. In the first part of 1889 he voted for reinstatement of first-past-the-post elections, against indefinite postponement of the revision to the constitution, against prosecution of the three members of the Ligue des Patriotes and against the draft Lisbonne law restricting freedom of the press. He abstained on 4 April 1889 from the vote on prosecuting General Boulanger.

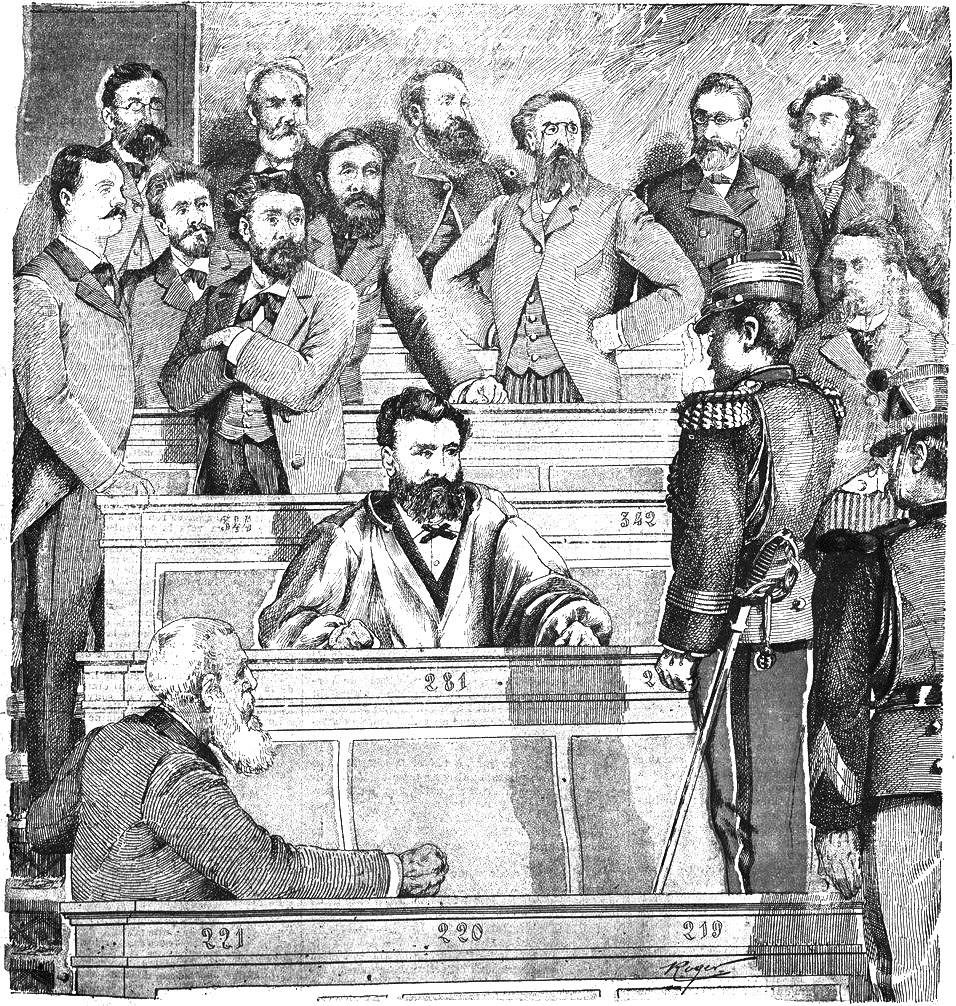
Expulsion of Christophe Thivrier from the Chamber (February 1894). Boyer is in the rear row, 3rd from left.

Boyer was reelected in the second round for the 5th district of Marseille in the general elections of 22 September and 6 October 1889. He joined several special committees, including one responsible for examining proposed laws on freedom of association. On 19 November 1889 Eugène Baudin, Joseph Ferroul, Antide Boyer and Valentin Couturier proposed that the mines should be nationalized, and demands for nationalization of regulation grew as strikes spread across France. Boyer was active in debates on the match monopoly (1889), May Day demonstrations and subsequent strikes (1890), industrial working conditions of women, children and underage girls, improved primary education, the May Day demonstration of 1891, and many other issues. Around 1890 Boyer directed the socialist workers' paper Le Combat, which was published at the same address as La Revue socialiste.

Boyer was reelected in the first round on 20 August 1893. He was compromised by Léopold Émile Aron^{(fr)} in the Panama scandals, but was acquitted. In 1897 he took part in the Greco-Turkish War with the rank of captain. He was wounded at the Battle of Domokos. He returned to France to run for reelection in the first round on 8 May 1898. In the 1902 general elections Boyer represented the Socialistes parlementaires. He was reelected in the first round on 27 April 1902 for the 6th district of Marseille. He was made a member of the committees of the Navy and of Posts and Telegraphs. He was once more elected in the first round on 6 May 1906, and again joined the Navy committee. On 3 January 1909 he was elected senator of Bouches-du-Rhône in a by-election following the death of senator Victor Leydet.

Boyer failed to be reelected to the Senate in January 1812 and retired to Marseille. Antide Boyer died on 24 July 1918 in Marseille, Bouches-du-Rhône, at the age of 67.

== Publications ==
- Baudin; Boyer; Cluseret (1890), Proposition de loi contre l'intervention de l'armée entre le capital et le travail (19 Novembre 1889), Paris: Motteroz / France. Chambre des députés
- Baudin; Boyer; Cluseret (1890), Proposition de loi sur les conditions du travail dans les fabriques d'allumettes chimiques (25 Novembre 1889), Paris: Motteroz / France. Chambre des députés
- Baudin; Antide Boyer; Calvinhac; Carnaud (1897), Proposition de loi relative à l'organisation du monopole de la raffinerie et à la réglementation de la production du sucre en vue de protéger les intérêts des travailleurs agricoles et industriels (16 January 1897), Paris: Motteroz / France. Chambre des députés

== Sources ==
- Antoine, Jean-Baptiste, dit Antide Boyer (in French), Assemblée nationale
- Bonifassi, Georges (2003), La presse régionale de Provence en langue d'Oc: des origines à 1914, Presses Paris Sorbonne, ISBN 978-2-84050-269-2
- Chapman, Guy (1962-06-18), Third Republic of France, Palgrave Macmillan UK, ISBN 978-1-349-00463-8
- Fonvieille-Vojtovic, Aline (1993), Paul Ramadier, 1888–1961: élu local et homme d'état (in French), Publications de la Sorbonne, ISBN 978-2-85944-226-2
- Goldberg, Harvey (1962), The Life of Jean Jaurès, Univ of Wisconsin Press, ISBN 978-0-299-02564-9
- Jolly, Jean (1960–1977), "BOYER (ANTOINE, JEAN-BAPTISTE, dit ANTIDE)", Dictionnaire des parlementaires français de 1889 à 1940, Paris: Presses universitaires de France, ISBN 2-1100-1998-0
- Robert, Adolphe; Cougny, Gaston (1889–1891), "BOYER (ANTIDE)", Dictionnaire des parlementaires français de 1789 à 1889 (in French), Edgar Bourloton
- Ward, Martha (1996), Pissarro, Neo-Impressionism, and the Spaces of the Avant-Garde, University of Chicago Press, ISBN 978-0-226-87324-4
