= Tito Zanardelli =

Italian anarchist and philologist

- Born: 1848; Vittorio Veneto
- Died: Unknown
- Occupations: Journalist, philologist
- Known for: Anarchism

Tito Zanardelli (1848–?) was an Italian journalist and anarchist. At first a proponent of revolution, later he became more moderate and advocated legal means to achieve the goals of the workers. He then retired from politics and spent many years in Belgium as a professor of mnemonics and a prolific author on philological subjects.

== Early years ==
Tito Zanardelli was born in Vittorio Veneto in 1848. His family were strolling players who traveled around Italy giving mnemonic demonstrations and spreading the gospel. His step-sister was Emilia Tronzio, a native of Cosenza who had lost her parents in a cholera epidemic . In the 1870s she was the mistress of Errico Malatesta, during the period of his activity with the First International. Later she married Giovanni Defendi in London. Zanardelli stayed for long periods in Naples, and became active in Giuseppe Mazzini's movement for Italian unification. In 1869 he was editor of the Gazzettino del popolo (People's gazette).

In 1871 Zanardelli joined the International Workingmen's Association (IWA) and joined the editorial staff of Il Motto d'ordine. In January 1872 he was one of the founders in Naples of the internationalist periodical La Campana. In August 1872 he attended the constitutive congress of the Federazione Alta Italia dell'Associazione Internazionale dei Lavoratori (FIAIL: Northern Italian section of the International Workingmen's Association) in Rimini, then was active in Venice where he and Pietro Magri co-founded the local workers' Federation. He worked in Trieste, in Austria-Hungary and in Rome where he worked with Osvaldo Gnocchi-Viani in organization and in international propaganda.

Zanardelli prepared an almanac to be printed at the start of 1873 that gave the biographies of prominent people of the International who had died, arranged in alphabetical order. He was one of the contributors to the series of biographies of communards that appeared in La Plèbe between 1873 and 1876. These were often imaginative celebrations of the revolutionary acts in eulogic style. In March 1873 he participated in the FIAIL Congress in Bologna, where he was elected to the Propaganda commission. Returning to Rome he became active in organizing construction workers. He was arrested, but released on bail, and in 1874 emigrated to Switzerland.

== Anarchist in exile ==
In August 1874 Zanardelli participated in the Geneva conference of the Universal League of Workers Guilds. He then settled in Lugano. With Lodovico Nabruzzi he was one of the main editors of the Agitatore. In November 1875 Zanardelli, Nabruzzi and Joseph Favre founded the Lake Lugano IWA section. Zanardelli began to move towards support of change through legal methods. Encouraged by Benoît Malon, Zanardelli and Nabruzzi published their Almanacco del proletario per l'anno 1876 in which they criticized the 1874 insurrection. During a news conference organized by his section in April 1876 Zanardelli spoke in favor of fighting for electoral reform.

Later in 1876 Zanardelli moved to Paris and joined the circle of Andrea Costa. In September 1877 he participated in the Universal Congress of Ghent, where he supported legal methods and opposed insurgency. He was a contributor to the journal Égalité, which promoted the view that workers could and should use the vote to further their interests, rejecting the more extreme view that political parties were only tricking the workers by giving them the franchise. He was arrested in March 1878 along with Costa and others, and expelled from France. He moved to London, where he launched the journal La Guerra sociale.

Zanardelli organized some of the Italians in London into a circle of social studies, which he later expanded it into an international club of social studies. On 3 November 1879 he spoke at a protest meeting arranged by the German club against the arrest in Germany of the anarchists Just and Kaufmann. Johann Most spoke at the same meeting. In 1879 he published a new paper, the Bollettino socialista rivoluzionario (Revolutionary Socialist Bulletin). He then secretly returned to Paris where he joined the group led by Amilcare Cipriani but did not talk. In December 1880 he participated in the Faiail Congress in Chiasso, where he supported Carlo Cafiero's anti-legal position. However, he began to be suspected as an agent provocateur. He returned to France, where he was again active in conferences.

== Later career ==
In October 1882 Zanardelli visited Italy to support Cipriani's candidacy, but was arrested in Turin. He was released the following month, and again was accused of assisting the police. He finally left the socialist and anarchist movement, moved to Brussels and devoted himself exclusively to the study of philology. He became a professor of mnemonic techniques in Brussels, and was a philologist and linguist in Brussels. He wrote many essays on language and place names, and even wrote two sonnets in French to Giovanni Pascoli. In 1891 he was editor of Langues & Dialectes, a quarterly philological review. He dedicated the review to his wife, Virginie Valentini.

== Bibliography ==
Zanardelli was a prolific author in his later years. A sample of his publications follows.

- Zanardelli, Tito (1872). La necropoli dei consorti: iscrizioni caustico-sepolcrali a molti pur troppo vivi gonfiaventri d'Italia a gonfianuvoli. F. Perrucchetti.
- Zanardelli, Tito; Nabruzzi, Ludovico (1875). Guida storico descrittiva-commerciale di Lugano, Bellinzona e Locarno. Franc. Veladini e Comp.
- Zanardelli, Tito (1882). L'operaio Italiano in Casa Sua E in Casa D'altri ... Conferenza, Etc.
- Zanardelli, Tito (1887). Traité comparé de prononciation italienne. Mayolez.
- Zanardelli, Tito (1887). Echi di lontane memorie: liriche italiane seguite da alcuni saggi di poesia francese. A. Lefèvre.
- Dubois, P. L. V.; Zanardelli, Tito (1888). Philologie wallonne. Monographie des patois du Luxembourg mériodional ... Avec une préface de T. Zanardelli.
- Zanardelli, Tito (1889). L'Origine du Langage expliquée par une nouvelle théorie de l'interjection, etc. (Extrait du Bulletin de la Société d'Anthropologie de Bruxelles.).
- Zanardelli, Tito (1890). Nouvelles stations préhistoriques des bords de la Meuse entre Profondeville et Annevoye, par Tito Zanardelli,... A. Moens.
- Zanardelli, Tito (1890). L'étrusque, l'ombrien et l'osque dans quelques uns de leurs rapports intimes avec l'italien. F. Hayez.
- Zanardelli, Tito (1892). In Morte Di Virginia Valentini-Zanardelli Da Macerata. Trecento Sonetti.
- Tito ZANARDELLI (1893). De la nature des noms abstraits et de leur concrescibilité, etc. (Extrait du Bulletin de la Société d'Anthropologie de Bruxelles.).
- Zanardelli, Tito (1895). Histoire de la Littérature Italianne: Les Premiers Siècles : Dante et ses Précurseurs. N. Dexonink, Imprimeur-éditeur.
- Zanardelli, Tito (1896). De Quelques suffixes d'origine celtique dans les noms de lieux de la Belgique, communication faite à la Société d'anthropologie de Bruxelles, dans la séance du 1er octobre 1895, par Tito Zanardelli. impr. de Hayez.
- Zanardelli, Tito (1898). La précelticite des noms de rivières en Belgique communication faite a la Société d'anthropologie de Bruxelles, dans la séance du 29 juin 1896. Hayez.
- Zanardelli, Tito (1898). Premier essai d'une carte de la Belgique, donnant les noms de lieux d'après leurs patois respectifs, communication faite à la Société d'anthropologie de Bruxelles, dans la séance du 31 mai 1897, par Tito Zanardelli. impr. de Hayez.
- Zanardelli, Tito; Wagner, Max Leopold (1900). Appunti Lessicali & Toponomastici, Etc.
- Zanardelli, Tito (1902). Sonetos en lengua castellana y en lengua portuguesa. N. Zanichelli.
- Zanardelli, Tito (1902). Etimologie di imola e meldola, con accenno all'antico "Castrum Mutilum". N. Zanichelli.
- Zanardelli, Tito (1907). I nomi di animali nella toponomastica emiliana. Ditta N. Zanichelli.
- Zanardelli, Tito; Wagner, Max Leopold (1910). Le Voci Sarde Zurpu, Turpu-cieco, Paperu Ed Altre. In Resposta Al Signor M.L. Wagner, Etc. (Supplemento Alla Puntata VII Degli Appunti.).
- Zanardelli, Tito (1910). Saggi Folklorici in Dialetto Di Badi (Appennino Bolognese). Con Glossario.
- Zanardelli, Tito (1910). Voci sarde. Zanichelli.
- Zanardelli, Tito (1911). Inventario di ferramenti del 1447 in dialetto bolognese con lessico illustrativo: Inomi di torrente Avesa e Anevo. N. Zanichelli.
- Zanardelli, Tito (1913). I Soprannomi di persone e di luogo a Lizzano in Belvedere ed altri siti dell'Appennino bolognese, per Tito Zanardelli. N. Zanichelli.
