= Benoît Malon =

French socialist and writer (1841–1893)

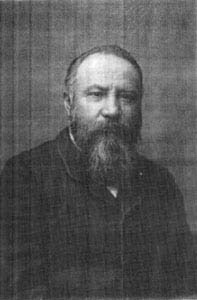
- Benoît Malon
- Born: 23 June 1841; Précieux
- Died: 13 September 1893 (aged 52); Asnières-sur-Seine
- Resting place: Père-Lachaise Cemetery

Benoît Malon (French pronunciation: [bənwa malɔ̃]; 23 June 1841 – 13 September 1893), was a French Socialist, writer, communard, and political leader.

== Biography ==
Malon came from a poor peasant family. An opportunity to escape the life of a rural labourer presented itself when Benoît was admitted to a seminary school in Lyon. However, instead of becoming a priest, Malon became interested in radical politics through the writings of P.-J. Proudhon. In 1863 he left the seminary and moved to Paris, where he worked in a factory as a dyer. He became a friend of Zéphyrin Camélinat. Camélinat was a friend of Proudhon and a collaborator of Charles Longuet, Karl Marx' son-in-law. Through Camélinat and Longuet, Malon became involved in the French section of the First International, which he joined in 1865. In the factional struggles within the International, Malon sided with the 'anti-authoritarian' followers of Proudhon and Bakunin, against the Marxists. Malon was active in organising factory workers and led several strikes. In 1868 and 1870, Malon was among the defendants in the sedition trials of the French Section of the International. He was sentenced to prison both times.

With the fall of Napoléon III in 1870, Malon was freed from prison and helped organise relief for the poor during the Prussian siege of Paris. He joined the 'Republican Central Committee', which united Proudhonists with followers of Auguste Blanqui. In 1871 Malon was elected to the National Assembly of the new Third Republic, but he resigned in protest against the peace treaty, which ceded Alsace-Lorraine to Prussia.

When the Paris Commune rose against the Thiers government at Versailles, Malon was elected to the Council of the Commune. He also served on the Committee on Labour and Trade. Malon opposed the Jacobin faction in the Commune, associated with Félix Pyat. Malon voted against the creation of a new Committee of Public Safety. He was horrified by the 'bloody week' when several hostages were shot. After the suppression of the Commune he escaped to Lugano, Switzerland, where he joined the Jura Federation, dominated by Bakuninists.

Around this time, Malon began a romantic relationship with Léodile Champseix (better known under her literary pseudonym André Léo), an author and feminist. They entered a 'free marriage' in 1872.

A general amnesty in 1880 enabled Malon to return to France, where he resumed work as a journalist and became involved in the new French Workers' Party (POF) of Jules Guesde. In 1882, the party split between 'orthodox' Marxists around Guesde and reformist 'possibilists' led by Paul Brousse. Malon sided with Brousse and helped organise the Federation of the Socialist Workers of France (FTSF).

In 1885, Malon founded the journal Revue Socialiste. Despite his affiliation with the Possibilists, Malon considered himself an independent socialist and called for the re-unification of the socialist movement (which he did not live to see). The Revue Socialiste opened its pages to all tendencies of French socialism. In 1889, he became editor of the newspaper Egalité. He also published several books, including a work on 'social economy' (1883), a five-volume history of socialism and a work outlining his theory of 'integral socialism' (1891).

When Malon died in 1893, his funeral at the Père-Lachaise cemetery was attended by a crowd of over 10,000 mourners. In 1913, a monument to Malon was established, and Jean Jaurès gave the dedication speech. In 1905, the various factions of French socialism united in the French Section of the Workers' International (SFIO).
