= Peace Conference =

A peace conference is a diplomatic meeting where representatives of certain states, armies, or other warring parties converge to end hostilities and sign a peace treaty.

Peace conference may also refer to:

- International Peace Conference, anti-war conference held on December 10, 2005
- Peace Conference of 1861, conference on the American Civil War
- Hague Conventions of 1899 and 1907, 1899 conference in the Hague

== See also ==
- List of Paris meetings, agreements and declarations
- Peace congress
