= Peace congress =

Forum to carry out dispute resolution in international affairs

A peace congress, in international relations, has at times been defined in a way that would distinguish it from a peace conference (usually defined as a diplomatic meeting to decide on a peace treaty), as an ambitious forum to carry out dispute resolution in international affairs, and prevent wars. This idea was widely promoted during the nineteenth century, anticipating the international bodies that would be set up in the twentieth century with comparable aims.

== History ==
The genesis of the idea of a meeting of representatives of different nations to obtain by peaceful arbitration a settlement of differences has been traced back as far as 1623 in modern history, to a French monk, Émeric Crucé, who wrote a work entitled "The New Cyneas", a discourse showing the opportunities and the means for establishing a general peace and liberty of conscience to all the world and addressed to the monarch and the sovereign princes of the time. He proposed that a city, preferably Venice, should be selected where all the powers had ambassadors and that there should be a universal union, including all peoples. He suggested careful arrangement as to priority, giving the first place to the pope.

Two years after this publication, in 1625, appeared in Latin the work of Hugo Grotius "On the Right of War and Peace", pleading for a mitigation of some of the barbarous usages of war.

William Penn had a plan for the establishment of a "European Dyet, Parliament or Estates". He was followed by other writers of different nationalities.

The concept of a peaceful community of nations had also been outlined in 1795, when Immanuel Kant’s Perpetual Peace: A Philosophical Sketch outlined the idea of a league of nations that would control conflict and promote peace between states.

International co-operation to promote collective security originated in the Concert of Europe that developed after the Napoleonic War in the nineteenth century in an attempt to maintain the status quo between European states and so avoid war. This period also saw the development of international law with the first Geneva Conventions establishing laws about humanitarian relief during war and the international Hague Conventions of 1899 and 1907 governing rules of war and the peaceful settlement of international disputes.

The forerunner of the League of Nations, the Inter-Parliamentary Union (IPU), was formed by peace activists William Randal Cremer and Frédéric Passy in 1889. The organization was international in scope with a third of the members of parliament, in the 24 countries with parliaments, serving as members of the IPU by 1914. Its aims were to encourage governments to solve international disputes by peaceful means and arbitration and annual conferences were held to help governments refine the process of international arbitration. The IPU's structure consisted of a Council headed by a President which would later be reflected in the structure of the League.

== Congresses ==
=== Vienna ===
After the defeat of Napoleon I of France an international peace congress took place in Vienna called the Congress of Vienna in 1815.

=== The Americas in the nineteenth century ===
In 1826, a congress composed of representatives of Spanish-American countries was planned by Bolívar for military as well as political purposes. One of its declared objects was "to promote the peace and union of American nations and establish amicable methods for the settlement of disputes between them". This congress failed, as only four Spanish-American countries were represented and only one ratified the agreement.

In 1831, however, Mexico took up the subject and proposed a conference of American Republics "for the purpose of bringing about not only a union and close alliance for defence, but also the acceptance of friendly mediation for the settlement of disputes between them, and the framing and promulgation of a code of penal laws to regulate their mutual relations". It does not appear that anything came of this congress, and in 1847 another was held at Lima, attended by representatives of Bolivia, Chile, Ecuador, New Granada, and Peru, for the purpose of forming an alliance of American republics. The United States was invited but as it was then at war with Mexico it sent no representative.

Another congress was held by representatives from the Argentine Republic, Bolivia, Chile, Colombia, Ecuador, Guatemala, Peru, and Venezuela, in 1864.

An effort to hold a congress was made by the governments of Chile and Colombia in 1880, "to the end that the settlement by arbitration of each and every international controversy should become a principle of American public law". This congress did not meet, however, owing to a war between Chile and Peru.

In 1881, the President of the United States invited the independent countries of North and South America to meet in a general congress at Washington, D.C., on 24 November 1882, "for the purpose of considering and discussing methods of preventing war between the nations of America". This meeting did not take place owing to a variety of reasons, but subsequently, by virtue of an Act of Congress of the United States an invitation was issued by the president to Mexico, the Central and South American Republics, Haiti, Dominican Republic, and Brazil to join in a conference to be held in the city of Washington, the project being to consider:

1. Measures tending to preserve the peace and promote the prosperity of the South American States;
2. measures looking to the formation of an American Customs Union;
3. the establishment of regular and frequent communication between the various countries;
4. the establishment of a uniform system of customs regulations, invoices, sanitation of ships, and quarantine;
5. the adoption of a uniform system of weights and measures, and of laws to protect patent rights, copyrights, and trade marks, and for the extradition of criminals;
6. the adoption of a common silver coin;
7. the adoption of a definite plan of arbitration of all questions, disputes, and differences; and
8. such other subjects relating to the welfare of the several States as might be presented by any of them.

The First International Conference of American States assembled at Washington on 2 October 1889. Eighteen American nations, including the United States, had their representatives. The conference adopted a plan of arbitration of international differences, together with various recommendations relating to trade, law, extradition, patents, customs, and sanitary regulations. It further declared arbitration to be a principle of American International Law and obligatory "in all controversies concerning diplomatic and consular privileges, boundaries, territories, indemnities, the right of navigation, and the validity, construction and enforcement of treaties; and that it should be equally obligatory in all other cases, whatever might be their origin, nature or object, with the sole exception of those which in the judgment of one of the nations involved in the controversy, might imperil its independence; but that even in this case, while arbitration for that nation should be optional, it should be obligatory on the adversary power" (7 Moore Int. Law Dig. p. 7). One notable result of the conference was the establishment of the Bureau of the American Republics. All the republics of South America are represented in this bureau, which continues for periods of ten years subject to renewal.

=== American Civil War ===
The Peace Conference of 1861 was a last-ditch effort to avert the coming Civil War.

=== Friends of Peace ===
Following an initial congress at London in 1843, an annual series of congresses called International Congress of the Friends of Peace or more informally "International Peace Congress" were organised from 1848 until 1853.

Elihu Burritt organized the Congress of 1848. The participants met at Brussels in September of that year. Among the distinguished delegates were Cobden, Thierry, Girardin, and Bastiat. The congress adopted resolutions urging limitation of armaments and the placing of a ban upon foreign loans for war purposes. Through the next decade, more congresses were convened in various cities without the development of anything new in principle or method.

- 1st congress: London (1843)
- 2nd congress: Brussels (1848)
- 3rd congress: Paris (1849)
- 4th congress: Frankfurt am Main (1850)
- 5th congress: London (1851)
- 6th congress: Manchester (1852)
- 7th congress: Edinburgh (1853)

=== The Hague ===
==== First Hague Conference ====
On 12 August 1898, in a circular letter addressed to the representatives of different nations, the Emperor of Russia proposed to all governments, which had duly accredited representatives at the imperial court, the holding of a conference to consider the problem of the preservation of peace among nations. During the summer of 1900 the conference assembled at The Hague and on 4 September the formal notification of the ratification of the convention for the pacific settlement of international disputes was given by the United States, Austria, Belgium, Denmark, United Kingdom, France, Germany, Italy, Persia, Portugal, Romania, Russia, Siam, Spain, Sweden, Norway, and the Netherlands, and subsequently by Japan. A Permanent Court of Arbitration was established at The Hague, composed representatives of each of the signatory powers appointed for a term of six years. Arbitrators called upon to form a competent tribunal may be chosen from a general list of the members of the court when any of the signatory powers desire to have recourse to the court for a settlement of any difference between them.

The South and Central American republics were not represented at the conference, but at the second International Conference of American States which was initiated by President McKinley and held in the City of Mexico, 22 October 1901, to 31 January 1902, a plan was adopted looking to adhesion to The Hague convention, the protocol being signed by all of the delegations except Chile and Ecuador, who subsequently gave their adhesion. The conference authorized the Governments of the United States and Mexico to negotiate with the other signatory powers for the adherence of other American nations. At this conference the project of a treaty for the arbitration of pecuniary claims was adopted, and the signatories agreed for a term of five years to submit to arbitration (preferably to the permanent court at The Hague) all claims for pecuniary loss or damage presented by their respective citizens and not capable of settlement through diplomatic channels, where they were of sufficient importance to warrant the expense of a court of arbitration.

==== Second Hague Conference ====
A second international peace conference was held at The Hague from 15 June to 18 October 1907. Forty-four States were represented, including the principal nations of Europe, North and South America, and Asia. The conference drew up thirteen conventions and one declaration. They are as follows: for the pacific settlement of international disputes; respecting the limitation of the employment of force for the recovery of contract debts relative to the opening of hostilities; respecting the laws and customs of war on land; respecting the rights and duties of neutral powers and persons in case of war on land; relative to the status of enemy merchant-ships at the outbreak of hostilities; relative to the conversion of merchant-ships into war-ships; relative to the laying of automatic submarine contact mines; respecting bombardment by naval forces in time of war; for the adaptation to naval war of the principles of the Geneva Convention; relative to certain restrictions with regard to the exercise of the right of capture in naval war; relative to the creation of an International Prize Court; concerning the rights and duties of neutral powers in naval war; and a declaration prohibiting the discharge of projectiles and explosives from balloons.

=== International League of Peace and Liberty ===
The International League of Peace and Liberty organised a series of international peace congresses.

- 1st congress: Geneva (1867)
- 2nd congress: Bern (1868)
- 3rd congress: Lausanne (1869)

=== Universal Peace Congress ===
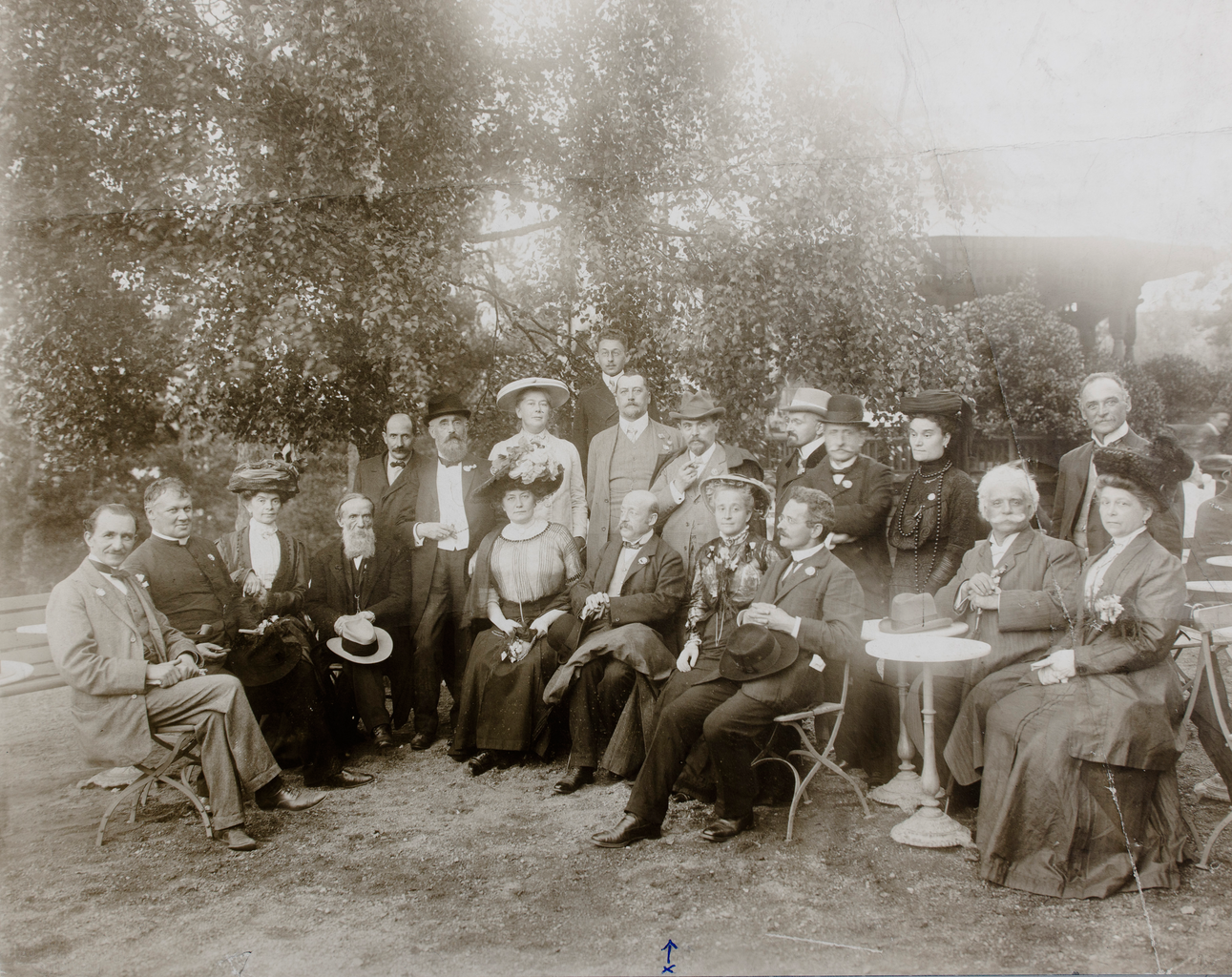
Universal Peace Congress in Stockholm, 1910

A series of international peace congresses called Universal Peace Congress (French: Congrès universel de la paix) took place between 1889 and 1939.

- 1st congress: Paris (1889)
- 2nd congress: London (1890)
- 3rd congress: Rome (1891)
- 4th congress: Bern (1892)
- 5th congress: Chicago (1893)
- 6th congress: Antwerp (1894)
- 7th congress: Budapest (1896) (Presided by István Türr)
- 8th congress: Hamburg (1897)
- 9th congress: Paris (1900)
- 10th congress: Glasgow (1901)
- 11th congress: Monaco (1902)
- 12th congress: Rouen (1903)
- 13th congress: Boston (1904). Speakers included Jane Addams and William James.
- 14th congress: Luzern (1905)
- 15th congress: Milan (1906)
- 16th congress: Munich (1907)
- 17th congress: London (1908)
- 18th congress: Stockholm (1910)
- 19th congress: Geneva (1912)
- 20th congress: The Hague (1913)
- 21st congress: Luxembourg (1921)
- 22nd congress: London (1922)
- 23rd congress: Berlin (1924)
- 24th congress: Paris (1925)
- 25th congress: Geneva (1926)
- 26th congress: Warsaw (1928)
- 27th congress: Athens (1929)
- 28th congress: Brussels (1931)
- 29th congress: Vienna (1932)
- 30th congress: Luzern (1934)
- 31st congress: Cardiff (1936)
- 32nd congress: Paris (1937)
- 33rd congress: Zürich (1939)

=== World War I ===
The Paris Peace Conference, that sought a lasting peace after World War I, approved the proposal to create the League of Nations (French: Société des Nations, German: Völkerbund) on 25 January 1919. The Covenant of the League of Nations was drafted by a special commission, and the League was established by Part I of the Treaty of Versailles. On 28 June 1919, the Covenant was signed by 44 states, including 31 states which had taken part in the war on the side of the Triple Entente or joined it during the conflict. Despite American President Woodrow Wilson's efforts to establish and promote the League, for which he was awarded the Nobel Peace Prize in 1919, the United States did not join the League.

The League held its first council meeting in Paris on 16 January 1920, six days after the Versailles Treaty came into force. In November, the headquarters of the League moved to Geneva, where the first General Assembly was held on 15 November 1920 with representatives from 41 nations in attendance.

=== Contemporary ===
- Congrès mondial des partisans de la paix, Paris 1949
- International Peace Conference, London, 10 December 2005)

== See also ==
- Peace conference
- International Peace Society
- List of peace activists
