= Geneva Peace Congress =

1867 international peace conference

Congress of Peace and Freedom
- Native name: Congrès de la paix et de la liberté
- Date: 9–12 September 1867
- Location: Palais Electoral, Geneva
- Also known as: Geneva Peace Congress
- Type: Peace congress
- Cause: Luxembourg Crisis
- Motive: European peace and the establishment of a United States of Europe
- Participants: 6,000
- Outcome: Establishment of the League of Peace and Freedom

The Geneva Peace Congress, also known as the First Congress of Peace and Freedom, was the inaugural congress of the League of Peace and Freedom. Called by French republicans in 1867, in response to the burgeoning Luxembourg Crisis, its stated aim was to foment peace between European states and to establish a United States of Europe. The Congress received support from more than 10,000 people and was attended by 6,000 delegates.

It began on 9 September 1867, with a speech from Italian revolutionary Giuseppe Garibaldi, who called for the Congress to become an adjudicator for inter-state disputes in Europe, denounced the papacy and proclaimed that peace and freedom could only be established by democratic republics. On the second day, the Russian anarchist Mikhail Bakunin proclaimed that nationalism and the existing order of large, centralised states were the principle obstacles to a United States of Europe; he called for a social revolution to overthrow existing states and establish a decentralised European federation.

Debates about the social question and religion caused the congress to break down, but it was able to pass a resolution establishing the League of Peace and Freedom, which sought to abolish the conditions for war and improve the wellbeing of the working class.

== Convocation ==
In 1866, the Kingdom of Prussia annexed the duchies of Holstein and Schleswig, creating the North German Confederation. The French Empire under Napoleon III responded by threatening to annex Luxembourg, which caused a diplomatic crisis. People throughout Europe protested the emperor's pronouncement, which French republicans took as an opportunity to put out an international call for peace and democracy. They received support from the Swiss politician James Fazy and established an organising committee, with Jules Barni as president. In June 1867, the organising committee issued a manifesto, inviting "all friends of free democracy" to participate in a congress in Geneva, with the aim of maintaining "liberty, justice and peace". The following month, they published an additional programme, which announced that the Congress would have a more specific objective: "to determine the political and economic conditions of peace among the nations, and in particular to establish the United States of Europe".

In the months leading up to the congress, 10,000 people co-signed the manifesto and each contributed a small fee to fund the Congress, which received sponsorship and public support from the English liberals John Bright and John Stuart Mill, the French republicans Louis Blanc, Victor Hugo and Edgar Quinet, the Italian nationalist Giuseppe Garibaldi, and the Russian socialists Alexander Herzen and Nikolay Ogarev. In contrast, Polish revolutionary leader Ludwik Mierosławski turned down the invitation, replying that he would not talk about peace in Europe until Polish independence was restored. Karl Marx, the leader of the International Workingmen's Association (IWA), also objected to the absence of class warfare from the programme.

== First day ==
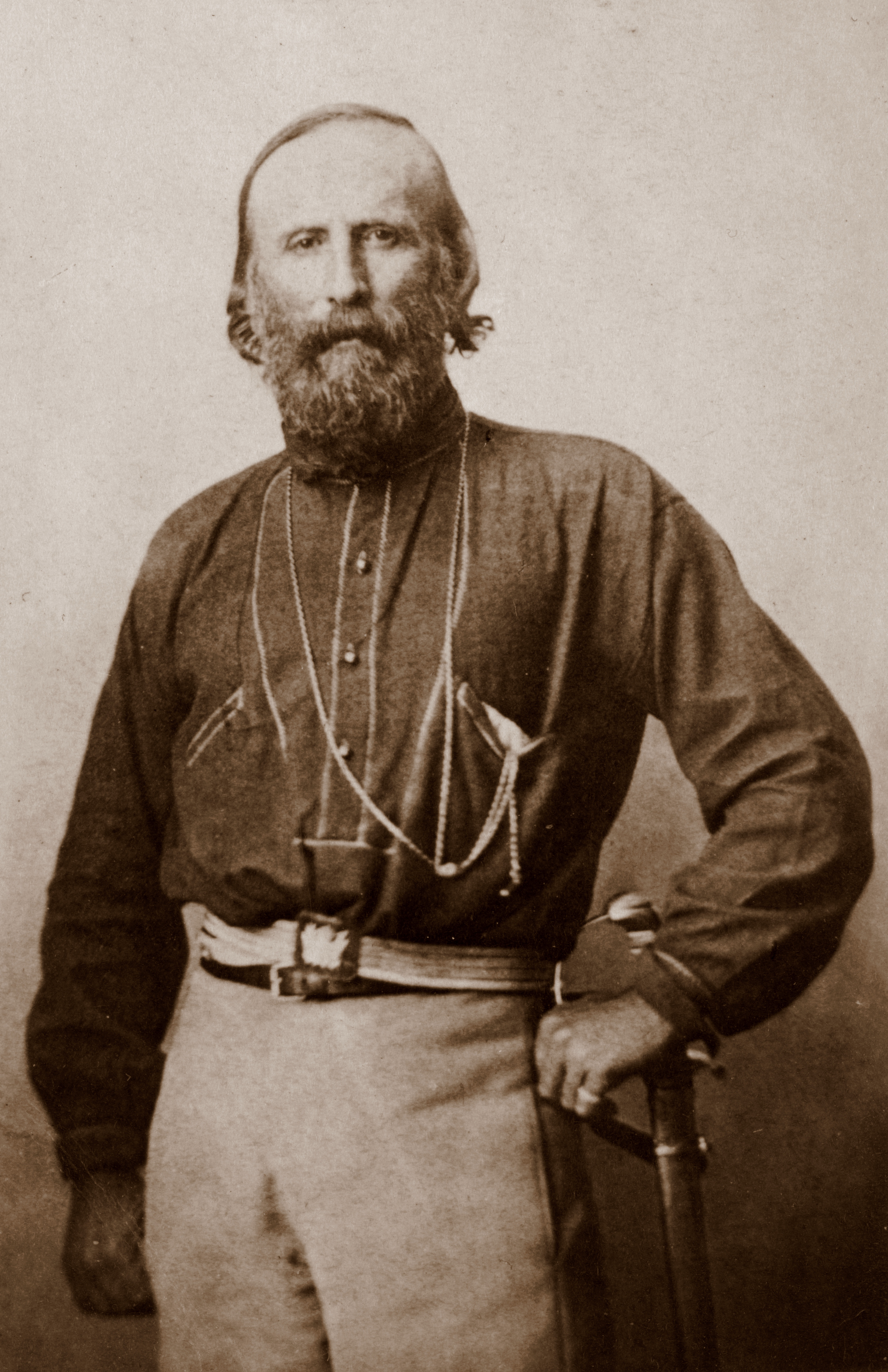
Giuseppe Garibaldi, the guest of honour at the Congress and principle speaker on its first day

The Geneva Congress began at 14:00 on 9 September 1867, in the Palais Electoral. It was attended by 6,000 people, most of whom came from Geneva. Delegates also came from France, including Quinet, and Germany. Neither Bright nor Stuart Mill attended, leaving England to be represented by trade unionists Randal Cremer and George Odger. Italian delegate Giuseppe Garibaldi, who had led the unification of Italy, was the guest of honour. Garibaldi had been an internationalist for most of his life, and hoped that the establishment of confederations could promote peace between nation and establish a United States of Europe. His arrival received a standing ovation from the assembled delegates. Of the Russian sponsors, Herzen did not attend the Congress, so his place was taken by the anarchist Mikhail Bakunin. The entry of Bakunin, who had become famous as a revolutionary enemy of the Tsarist autocracy in Russia, caused excitement in the chamber. He was greeted warmly by Garibaldi, who embraced him to applause from the attendees. Despite the outsized role played by Polish revolutionaries in the international movements of the period, none were present for the Congress. Władysław Mickiewicz wrote to the Congress that he expected the issue of Polish independence to be on the agenda, and urged them to affirm the need for armed action to restore the Polish Republic. Several members of the IWA attended the Congress, despite Karl Marx's objections to it. Behind the speakers' platform, the flags of all European nations surrounded a large banner with the word "PAX". Upon seeing this, a French delegate immediately protested the inclusion of the imperial standard of Napoleon III. His protest received support, but it was ultimately ruled out of order, as the Swiss delegates were concerned that removing it would compromise Swiss neutrality.

As its first decision, the Congress appointed a bureau to lead the new movement for European democracy, on which every nationality would be represented by two delegates; the Swiss democrat Pierre Jolissaint was elected as its president. Jolissant quoted the French anarchist Pierre-Joseph Proudhon as an authority on contemporary economic and political matters. The Congress then agreed on its "preliminary manifesto", which set as its goal the establishment of peace between European nations and a Federal Europe. The floor was subsequently opened to a general debate. Garibaldi began the debate by proposing a twelve-point programme. He started by declaring an end to war between European nations and proposing that any disputes between nations should be adjudicated by the Congress, which would be elected by democratic associations of all nations. Surprise was expressed at the forcefulness of this proposal, to which Garibaldi remarked "you will tell me perhaps that I am going rather fast". He also proposed that the Papacy be abolished, to applause from most of the chamber. Then he called for the Congress to adopt and preach "the religion of truth and reason", to stunned silence from the crowd, and for the Congress to appoint scientists and intellectuals as its priests and propagate this new religion by "training, education and example". These pronouncements alienated both Catholics and atheists in the crowd. His next proclamations, that republics were the only acceptable form of government and that only democracies could achieve peace, were warmly received. And his final point, which declared that "the slave alone has the right to make war on tyrants", received the most support, as it outlined a right of self-defense that was amenable to all nationalities assembled. Following Garibaldi's speech, the Congress adjourned for the day.

== Second day ==
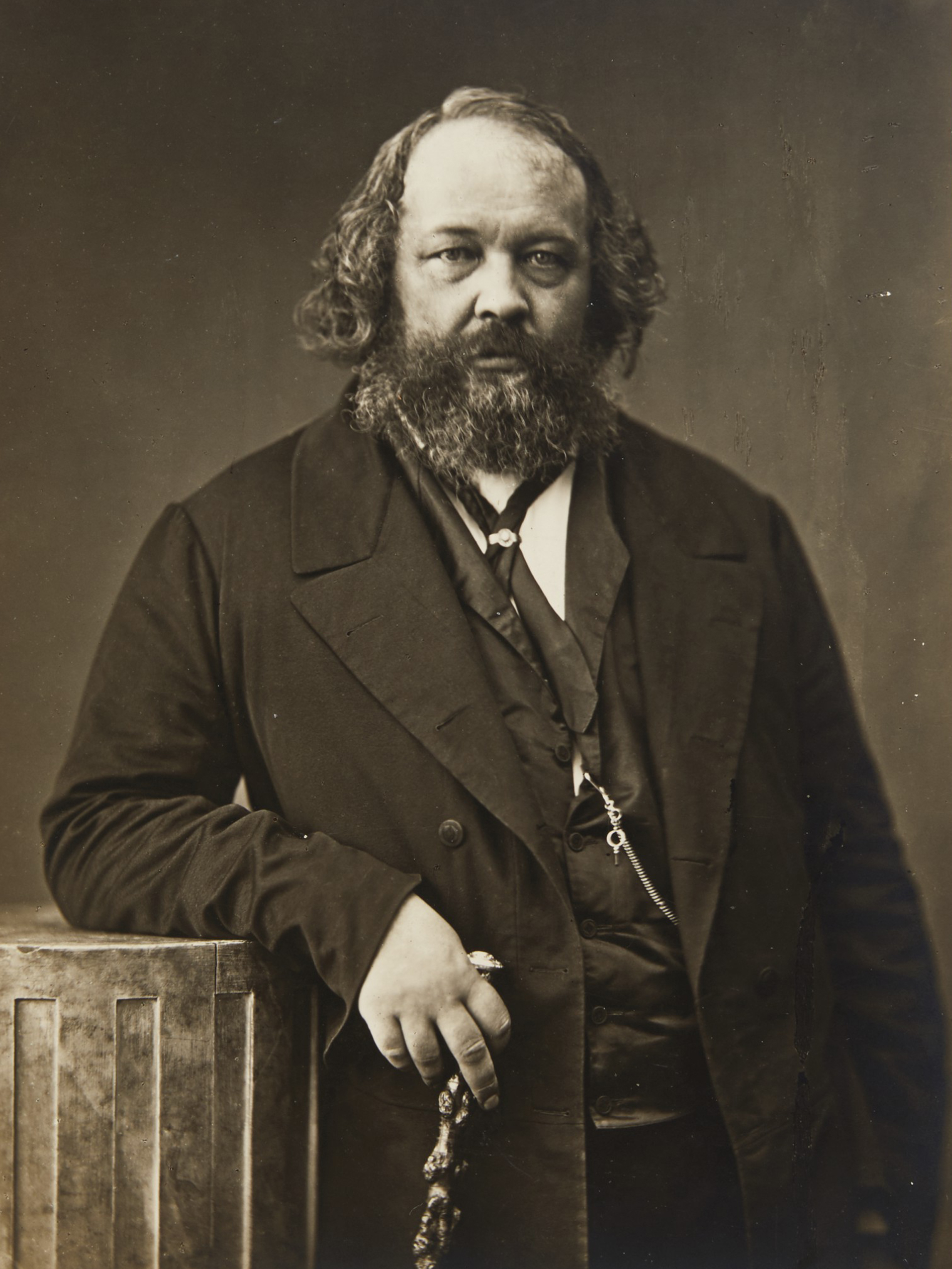
Mikhail Bakunin, Russian delegate to the Congress and principle speaker on its second day

During the second day of the Congress, the initial cordiality of the first day gave way to fierce debates over the social question and matters of religion. The proceedings began with a declaration by delegates of the IWA, which had just concluded its Lausanne Congress. The IWA stated that war most greatly affected the wellbeing of the working class, whose aspirations were constrained by being force to fight and die in the state's wars, and proclaimed that peace could only be achieved through the abolition of class stratification. Belgian IWA delegate César De Paepe insisted that war would continue so long as capitalism and patriotism existed, as he believed wars were a product of what he called a "lack of equilibrium" in politics and the economy. French IWA delegate Eugène Dupont argued that peace could be brought about by a social revolution, which would consolidate citizens of all nations into a single working class. Another French IWA member, Eugène Chemalé, warned that war would lead to the centralisation of power under a single despot and further wealth accumulation by capitalists, which he concluded would exacerbate social inequality and poverty. As a solution, he argued for federalism, freedom and socialism. Gustave Chaudey claimed that international peace could not be achieved between states that held a monopoly on violence, particularly monarchies and militarised states such as France and Prussia. In an attempt to bring together the programmes of the IWA and the League, he called for decentralisation, federalism and the improvement of conditions for the working classes as a way to build peace; his speech received a standing ovation. Swiss socialist James Guillaume announced that the IWA would adhere to the Congress's programme, on the condition that the Congress in turn adopt the IWA's own socialist and anti-capitalist programme. The IWA pronouncements were protested by more conservative delegates. They were followed by the German delegate Sigismund Ludwig Borkheim, who proclaimed that the only way to achieve a European peace was through a war against the Russian Empire.

Mikhail Bakunin spoke next, beginning by seconding Borkheim's proposal; Bakunin predicted that Russia's military defeat would trigger a social revolution, which would replace the Tsarist autocracy with a socialist federation. He then questioned how the conditions for an international peace would be achieved, given the limited power that the Congress had at its disposal. He believed that the main thing preventing international peace was nationalism, or what he called the "false principle of nationality". He rejected the use of nationality, which he considered to be a mere fact of ethnography, by nation states to justify expansionism. He proposed that national interests ought be supplanted by a system of international justice, under which the self-determination of all nationalities would arise naturally from the establishment of universal freedoms. He also condemned the existing order of large, centralised states, which he believed to be the main obstacle to the United States of Europe, as they implicitly constituted a threat to smaller nations. He posited that a stable federation could not be formed by states of unequal power, pointing to the power disparities that would exist in a federation between the large states of France and Russia and the small states of Baden and Romania respectively. He therefore called for the overthrow of existing centralised states, so that the United States of Europe could be constructed from the bottom-up - from the municipal to the international level - as a decentralised federation. Bakunin's speech was not recorded, as the stenographers were unable to keep up with how fast he spoke, so he later wrote it down from memory and published it as Federalism, Socialism, Anti-Theologism. Nikolai Wrangel reported that Bakunin's speech made a "tremendous impression" and remarked that "if he had asked his hearers to cut each other's throats, they would have cheerfully obeyed him".

== Third day ==
On the third day of the Congress, debates between the delegates began to break down, with speeches constantly being interrupted. Garibaldi had left Geneva, having departed to lead the Battle of Mentana against the Papal States. The remaining Italian delegates continued to condemn the Papacy, which they considered the main threat to world peace. One French delegate went further, arguing that Christianity itself was the main cause of war, which caused an uproar among the conservative delegates. One conservative delegate from Neuchâtel argued against the idea that political freedom was interconnected with peace, pointing out that stateless societies in Africa and the Americas often warred with one another, while the United States had just fought a bloody civil war despite its liberal constitution.

== Fourth day ==
On the fourth day, the Congress looked set to break up due to the discord between its delegates. To resolve the disputes, the organisational bureau put forward a resolution that omitted any objectionable content, such as references to socialism or religion. Conservative and clericalist factions attempted to prevent the resolution from passing, but it was ultimately approved by a majority vote. The resolution declared that existing European governments were incapable of preserving peace or assuring economic and political development, and that the existence of standing armies was incompatible with the freedom and wellbeing of all sectors of society. With a view to establishing peace in Europe, on the basis of liberty and democracy, the Congress established a League of Peace and Freedom, with a central committee to run the organisation between annual congresses. It called on every member of the League to shape public opinion against the ignorance and prejudices that caused war, agitate for the abolition of standing armies and replace them with a militia system, and to improve the welfare of the working and propertyless classes. The Congress ended with an excursion to Lake Geneva, where the new League held a banquet. The assembled delegates took the opportunity to hold toasts, in which the radicals relitigated issues from the congress, provoking any remaining conservative delegates to leave in protest. Although most of the radical delegates left the Congress believing it to have had a bourgeois and conservative character, Mikhail Bakunin was optimistic about the prospects for using it to advance his revolutionary aims of federalism, socialism and anti-theism.

== Aftermath and legacy ==
After the Congress, the League's new permanent executive committee began meeting and published a journal under the name of The United States of Europe. The League's Second Congress, which took place in Berne in September 1868, was attended by only 100 delegates; the social question again caused a fierce debate, culminating with Mikhail Bakunin's radical faction splitting away the League after his resolution on the abolition of class stratification was rejected by a majority vote. In 1869, a third congress was held in Lausanne, where it was attended by a small number of Swiss delegates and presided over by Victor Hugo. The outbreak of the Franco-Prussian War resulted in the effective dissolution of the League. Its executive committee reorganised into the International Bureau of Peace, which maintained its seat in Berne, before moving to Geneva in the early 1930s.

The Geneva Peace Congress was the first significant attempt to foster international cooperation and promote peace between European nations. Although issues of social equality and religion had caused discord, Garibaldi's pronouncement against nationalism and Bakunin's against centralisation did not receive substantial opposition. Although a revolutionary new idea for the time, Garibaldi's proposal that international disputes be judged by a Congress of democratic representatives of all nations was likewise not subject to dispute. E. H. Carr pointed to it as a radical experiment in multilateralism, one which anticipated the later League of Nations.

== Bibliography ==
- Anta, Claudio Giulio (2021). "The Colors of Pacifism Between the XIX and XX Centuries". Online International Journal of Philosophy. XVI (31). doi:10.7413/18281567198.
- Carr, E. H. (1935). "The League of Peace and Freedom: An Episode in the Quest for Collective Security". International Affairs. 14 (6): 837–844. doi:10.2307/2601913. JSTOR 2601913.
- Carr, E. H. (1975) [1937]. Michael Bakunin. London: Macmillan Press. doi:10.1007/978-1-349-02632-6. ISBN 978-1349026326. OCLC 1004387682. SBN 333 18425 4.
- Castleton, Edward (2017). "The origins of 'collectivism': Pierre-Joseph Proudhon's contested legacy and the debate about property in the International Workingmen's Association and the League of Peace and Freedom". Global Intellectual History. 2 (2): 169–195. doi:10.1080/23801883.2017.1350114.
- Guida, Francesco (2020). "The Confederal Idea in the Context of the Common Struggle for the Nationall of the Italians and the Peoples of Center and Eastern European". Romanian Journal of History. LIX (1–4): 57–68. ISSN 0556-8072.
- Marshall, Peter H. (2008) [1992]. Demanding the Impossible: A History of Anarchism. London: Harper Perennial. ISBN 978-0-00-686245-1. OCLC 218212571.
- Musto, Marcello, ed. (2014). Workers Unite!: The International 150 Years Later. Bloomsbury Publishing. ISBN 9781628922462.
- Ostrowski, Marius S. (2018). "League of Peoples or League of States: An Investigation". Eduard Bernstein on Social Democracy and International Politics. Palgrave Macmillan. doi:10.1007/978-3-319-70781-5_16.
- Schrupp, Antje (2018). "Bringing Together Feminism and Socialism in the First International". In Bensimon, Fabrice; Quentin, Deluermoz; Moisand, Jeanne (eds.). Arise Ye Wretched of the Earth": The First International in a Global Perspective. Studies in Global Social History. Vol. 29. Brill. pp. 343–354. doi:10.1163/9789004335462_023. ISBN 978-90-04-33546-2.
