= Émile Acollas =

French jurist (1826–1891)

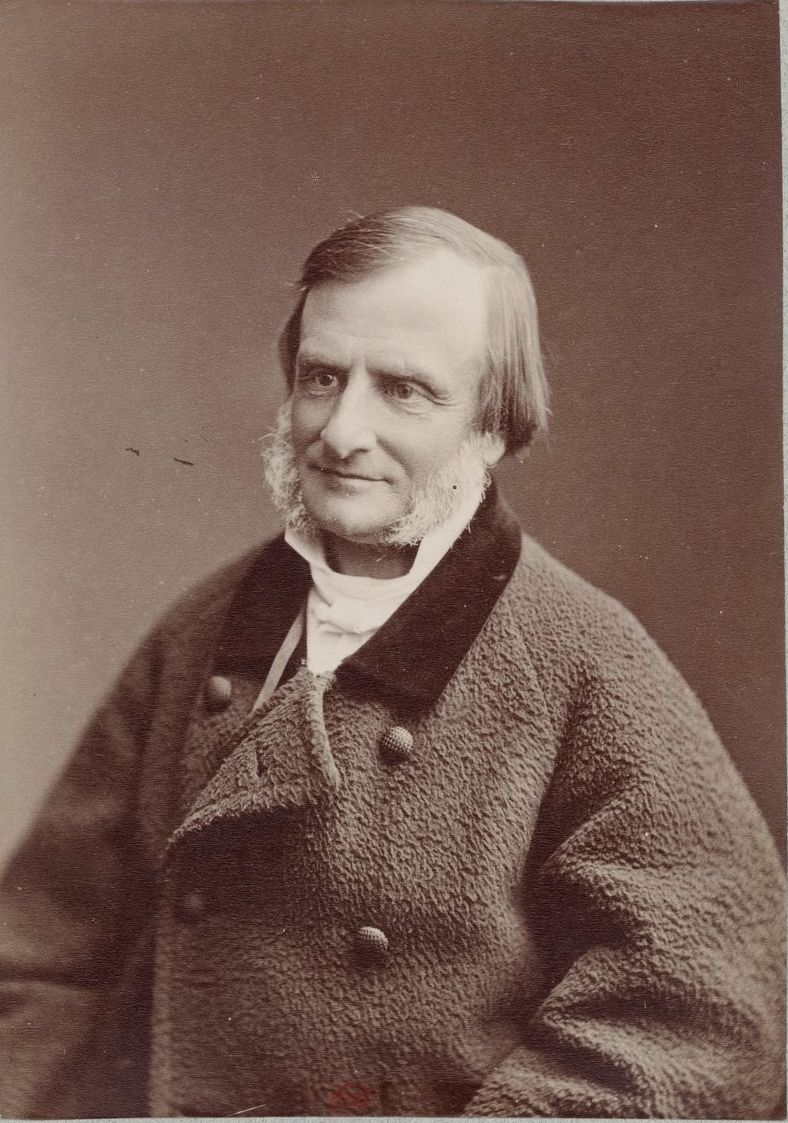

Emile Acollas (French: [akɔla]; 25 June 1826, La Châtre – 17 October 1891, Asnières) was a French professor of jurisprudence born in La Châtre, Indre and educated in Bourges and Paris.

He was one of the founders of the League of Peace and Freedom set up in 1867. His call for the conference gained 10,000 adherents including Victor Hugo, John Stuart Mill, Elisée Reclus, Giuseppe Garibaldi, Louis Blanc and Mikhail Bakunin. Karl Marx was dismissive and urged the newly formed International Workingmen's Association to have no official involvement. Acollas insisted that the first Conference, held in Geneva, should be called a "revolutionary conference". At the subsequent conference held in 1869 in Lausanne, Acollas attacked the very idea of monarchy. But the League was to collapse with the outbreak of the Franco-Prussian War.

In 1870, Acollas had the post at the University of Berne, when the Paris Commune appointed him Dean of the Law Faculty of the University of Paris. However he never took up the post and avoided any recriminations, returning to Paris in 1871. He set up the Acollas Law School primarily for foreign students wishing to attend the University of Paris.

Georges Clemenceau and the Japanese noble Saionji Kinmochi were both linked to the school. Saionji was to continue to visit Acollas, and later described him as his best friend in Europe. Acollas was interested in oriental language and became a member of the Japanese Research Society. Other Japanese students included Nakae Chomin who was active in the Japanese Freedom and People's Rights Movement.

Acollas took a critical view of Rousseau's theory of rights, arguing that his ideas on individual autonomy would lead to a dictatorship of the majority. Rather he proposed a republican system of representative government. His student Nakae translated Rousseau's Social Contract and became known as the "Rousseau of the East".

Acollas ran unsuccessfully in the French general election in 1876 calling for a complete amnesty for the communards, calling for a decentralised federalism, revocable mandates for elected representatives and free association a way of gaining an equitable distribution of goods. These demands were similar to Bakunin's proposals at the League for Peace and Freedom and are also present in the demands of the Japanese Popular Rights Movement.

Acollas is mentioned in Nakae's book A Discourse by Three Drunkards on Government 1887, where a character called "Shinshikun" (Highbrow) remarks:

Recently when the French philosopher Emile Acollas classified all the various kinds of laws, he ranked international law in terms of morality rather than jurisprudence. According to Acollas . . . (m)orality, unlike law, is made effective by the dictates of individual conscience. Similarly international law has no officials to enforce it, but depends instead only on the 'consciences' of the nations involved.
