= Émeric Crucé =

French writer (1590–1648)

Émeric Crucé (1590–1648) was a French political writer, known for the Nouveau Cynée (1623), a pioneer work on international relations. He advocated for an international pacific body of representatives of many countries.

== Life ==
Little specifics are known about him. He taught in a college in Paris, is said to have been a monk, and is supposed to have been from a humble background.

== The "New Cyneas" ==
The Nouveau Cynée ou Discours d'Estat représentant les occasions et moyens d'establir une paix générale et la liberté de commerce pour tout le monde takes its name from Cyneas, a diplomat-statesman of the ancient world who was active around 300 BC and known for his emphasis on peace. Crucé, in accordance with Cyneas, made peace central to his philosophical and political thought.

Crucé took the position that wars were the result of international misunderstandings and the domination of society by the warrior class, both of which could be reduced through commerce which brought people together.

He is pacifist in tone, and envisages an international body to maintain peace. It should be a permanent gathering of princes, or their representatives, in session at Venice, whose task would be to resolve national or international disputes. Radically, he suggests that the Islamic powers would participate in this permanent peace congress; Crucé's thinking runs along the lines of a common humanity. Membership of this body would be completely voluntary.

His system relies on a measure of free trade, and proposes a single currency and standardized weights and measures. There is an emphasis on social and economic objectives, as well as public spending.

Crucé's ideas are in sharp contrast to those of Jean Bodin, whose ideas are based on national sovereignty and the acceptance of war.
