= Virginie Barbet =

French anarchist and feminist (1824–1883)

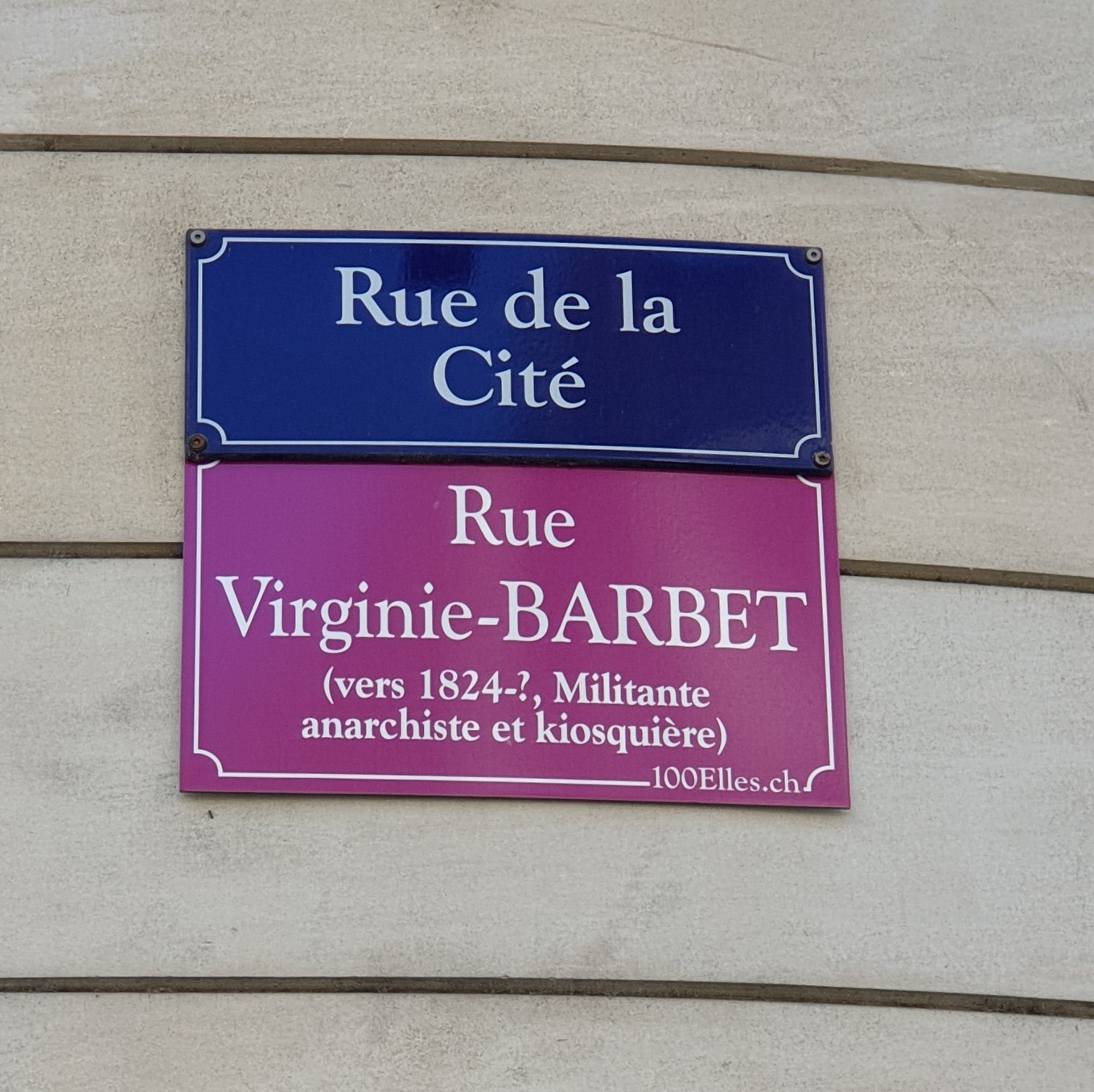
- Commemorative road sign dedicated to Barbet, in Geneva (2019)
- Born: Magdeleine Barbet; 20 February 1824; Saint-Denis-lès-Bourg, Ain, France
- Died: 8 September 1883 (aged 59); Sidi M'Hamed, Algeria
- Organizations: International Workingmen's Association (1868–1872); International Alliance of Socialist Democracy (1869–1871); Jura Federation (1872–1881)

Virginie Barbet (1824–1883) was a French anarchist and feminist. A proponent of social democracy in Lyon in the late 1860s, she joined the International Alliance of Socialist Democracy with Mikhail Bakunin and participated in the Lyon section of the First International. She and other Lyon exiles lived in Geneva during the 1870s.

== Biography ==
Virginie Barbet was born Magdeleine Barbet in the Arpitan town of Saint-Denis-lès-Bourg, on 20 February 1824. She married Philibert Nesme in 1844, but they soon separated and Barbet opened a pub in Lyon, where she ran a cabaret. Together with Marie Richard, she established a feminist group in Lyon, which called for the abolition of all forms of gender inequality.

In July 1868, Barbet signed a manifesto of the Société de la revendication du droit des femmes, which called for gender equality and women's rights. That same year, she attended the Brussels Congress of the International Workingmen's Association (IWA), as the treasurer for the Lyon delegation. In October 1868, she attended the Bern Congress of the League of Peace and Freedom, where she represented the social democrats from Lyon. She later joined the International Alliance of Socialist Democracy, which split from the League, founding its Lyon group in June 1869. The Alliance's programme on gender equality aligned closely with Barbet's own feminist manifesto. She became close with the Alliance's leader Mikhail Bakunin, for whom she wrote articles on the abolition of inheritance and resistance to conscription. These articles have since been attributed to Bakunin. She also wrote a piece about atheism.

Following the repression of an ironworkers' strike in Seraing in April 1869, she signed a letter on behalf of the Lyon section expressing solidarity with the Belgian section of the IWA. In the summer of 1869, she organised a strike of women in Lyon's textile industry, during which she recruited several more women into the IWA. In April 1870, she signed an address in support of a metalworkers' strike in Le Creusot, and urged them to win over the 5,000 soldiers garrisoned in the town. Following the suppression of the Paris Commune, she issued a response to Giuseppe Mazzini criticising his condemnation of the commune. Due to her involvement in the short-lived Creusot Commune, in the summer of 1871, she and other Lyonaisse revolutionaries fled into exile in Switzerland. Barbet was sentenced in absentia. From 1873, Barbet was living in Geneva. There she joined a local revolutionary socialist group, publishing the bulletin of the Jura Federation and gave a number of radical speeches, notably calling for the death of Alexander II of Russia. For this last act, she was questioned by the Swiss police, although they ended up noting that she "did not seem very dangerous."

Barbet was not well known during her own time. Two of her books were later published in 1901.

== Selected works ==
- Déisme et athéisme, profession de foi d’une libre penseuse, Lyon 1869, in-8°, 15 p.
- Réponse d’un membre de l’Internationale à Mazzini, Assoc. typo. de Lyon, 1871, in-8°, 16 p.
- Religions et libre-pensée, Genève, Imprimerie jurassienne, 1881, 36 p.
- Rayon d’avenir, l’abolition du paupérisme, par V. Barbet, Meulan, 1901, 28 pp. (8° R, Pièce 8774)
- La veuve rouge et ses amants, par V. Barbet, Meulan, 1902, 27 pp. (8° R, Pièce 9279)

== Bibliography ==
- Barry, David (1996). "The Commune of 1871: the Great Venture in Female Citizenship". Women and Political Insurgency: France in the Mid-Nineteenth Century. Palgrave Macmillan. doi:10.1057/9780230374362_7.
- Eckhardt, Wolfgang (2016). The First Socialist Schism: Bakunin vs. Marx in the International Working Men's Association. Oakland, California: PM Press. ISBN 978-1629630427. LCCN 2014908069. OCLC 1242987176.
- Enckell, Marianne (5 October 2021). "BARBET Virginie (Magdelaine, dite), épouse Nesme". Le Maitron (in French). Paris: Maitron/Editions de l'Atelier.
- Schrupp, Antje (2018). "Bringing Together Feminism and Socialism in the First International". In Bensimon, Fabrice; Quentin, Deluermoz; Moisand, Jeanne (eds.). Arise Ye Wretched of the Earth": The First International in a Global Perspective. Studies in Global Social History. Vol. 29. Brill. pp. 343–354. doi:10.1163/9789004335462_023. ISBN 978-90-04-33546-2.

== External link ==
- Biography on Le Maitron (in French)
