= Peace conference =

Meeting organised to seek resolution to conflict and sign a peace treaty

A peace conference is a diplomatic meeting where representatives of states, armies, or other warring parties converge to end hostilities by negotiation and signing and ratifying a peace treaty.

Significant international peace conferences include:

- St. Petersburg Declaration of 1868
- Algeciras Conference (1905)
- Hague Conventions of 1899 and 1907
- Versailles (1919)
- Good Friday Agreement (1998)
- Conference of San Remo of 1920

== See also ==
- Peace congress
- Peace treaties by country (list)
- List of peace activists
- Nobel Peace Prize
