= League of Peace and Freedom =

European federalist and pacifist organisation

- Ligue de la paix et de la liberté
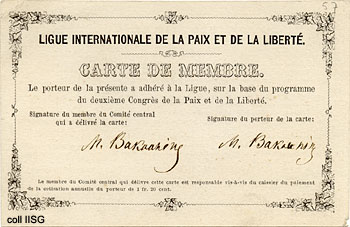
- Mikhail Bakunin's membership card
- Predecessor: International Peace Congress
- Established: 30 May 1867; 159 years ago
- Founders: Émile Acollas; Frédéric Passy
- Dissolved: 1874; 152 years ago
- Type: Political international
- Headquarters: Bern
- Members: 10,000 (1867)
- Official languages: French and German
- President: Jules Barni (1867); Gustav Vogt (1867–1869); Jules Barni (1869–1870)
- Key people: Victor Hugo; Giuseppe Garibaldi; Mikhail Bakunin; Gustave Chaudey
- Main organ: The United States of Europe
- Secessions: International Alliance of Socialist Democracy

The International League of Peace and Freedom (French: Ligue internationale de la paix et de la liberte) was a political international dedicated to building peace and freedom through the establishment of a United States of Europe. Founded by French republicans in the wake of the Luxembourg Crisis, the League aimed to unite European democrats of all tendencies under the platform of democratic republicanism, decentralisation and federalism. At the League's first congress in Geneva, the Italian revolutionary Giuseppe Garibaldi and the Russian anarchist Mikhail Bakunin spoke about the establishment of a European federation by asserting the primacy of international justice against the interests of the nation state; it concluded with a call for the abolition of standing armies and the improvement of the wellbeing of the working classes.

Under Bakunin's influence, the League's central committee then adopted a programme that advocated for freedom of religion and secularism, the creation of a decentralisated European federation with full equality before the law, and the abolition of social classes and the redistribution of wealth. The social question caused a split within the League's second congress, where Bakunin unsuccessfully pushed for the organisation to adopt the platform of the International Workingmen's Association (IWA), which called for social equality and the abolition of private property; he subsequently left the League and established the International Alliance of Socialist Democracy (AIDS).

Following the Franco-Prussian War, the League effectively collapsed to its internal divisions and its attempts to organise further peace congresses were stillborn. The League's advocacy of a Federal Europe was later taken up in the 20th century and its attempts to foment peace constituted a precursor to those of the League of Nations.

== Background ==
In the wake of the suppression of the Revolutions of 1848, radicalism and republicanism entered into a period of decline over the course of the 1850s. But during the early 1860s, radical tendencies of anti-authoritarianism, secularism and Pan-Europeanism began to flourish again, with a number of international associations being established to promote democracy and international cooperation. Meanwhile, in 1866, the Schleswig–Holstein question was resolved on the side of the Kingdom of Prussia, which annexed the duchies of Holstein and Schleswig, creating the North German Confederation. This provoked a response from the French Empire, with Napoleon III threatening to annex Luxembourg, which caused a diplomatic crisis. People throughout Europe protested the emperor's pronouncement, which French republicans took as an opportunity to put out an international call for peace and democracy. Seeking to prevent conflict between France and Prussia, Émile Acollas and Frédéric Passy moved to establish a "League of Peace and Freedom". On 30 May 1867, Passy announced the establishment of this new League, which received support from pacifists throughout Europe.

This League received support from the Swiss politician James Fazy and established an organising committee, with Jules Barni as president. In June 1867, the organising committee issued a manifesto, inviting "all friends of free democracy" to participate in a congress in Geneva, with the aim of maintaining "liberty, justice and peace". The following month, they published an additional programme, which announced that the Congress would have a more specific objective: "to determine the political and economic conditions of peace among the nations, and in particular to establish the United States of Europe". From its founding, the nascent League took on a staunchly progressive and republican political orientation, advocating for the extension of civil liberties, the decentralisation of state power to the regional and municipal levels, the replacement of standing armies with militias and the creation of a Federal Europe.

The League's call for democracy was a radical one, but was broadly defined enough as to accommodate for a range of different political tendencies. In the months leading up to the congress, 10,000 people co-signed the manifesto and each contributed a small fee to fund the Congress. Its members would largely be liberal democrats and philanthropists. The Congress received sponsorship and public support from the English liberals John Bright and John Stuart Mill, the French republicans Louis Blanc, Victor Hugo and Edgar Quinet, the Italian nationalist Giuseppe Garibaldi, and the Russian socialists Alexander Herzen and Nikolay Ogarev. In contrast, Polish revolutionary leader Ludwik Mierosławski turned down the invitation, replying that he would not talk about peace in Europe until Polish independence was restored. Karl Marx, the leader of the International Workingmen's Association (IWA), also objected to the absence of class warfare from the programme.

== Geneva Congress (1867) ==
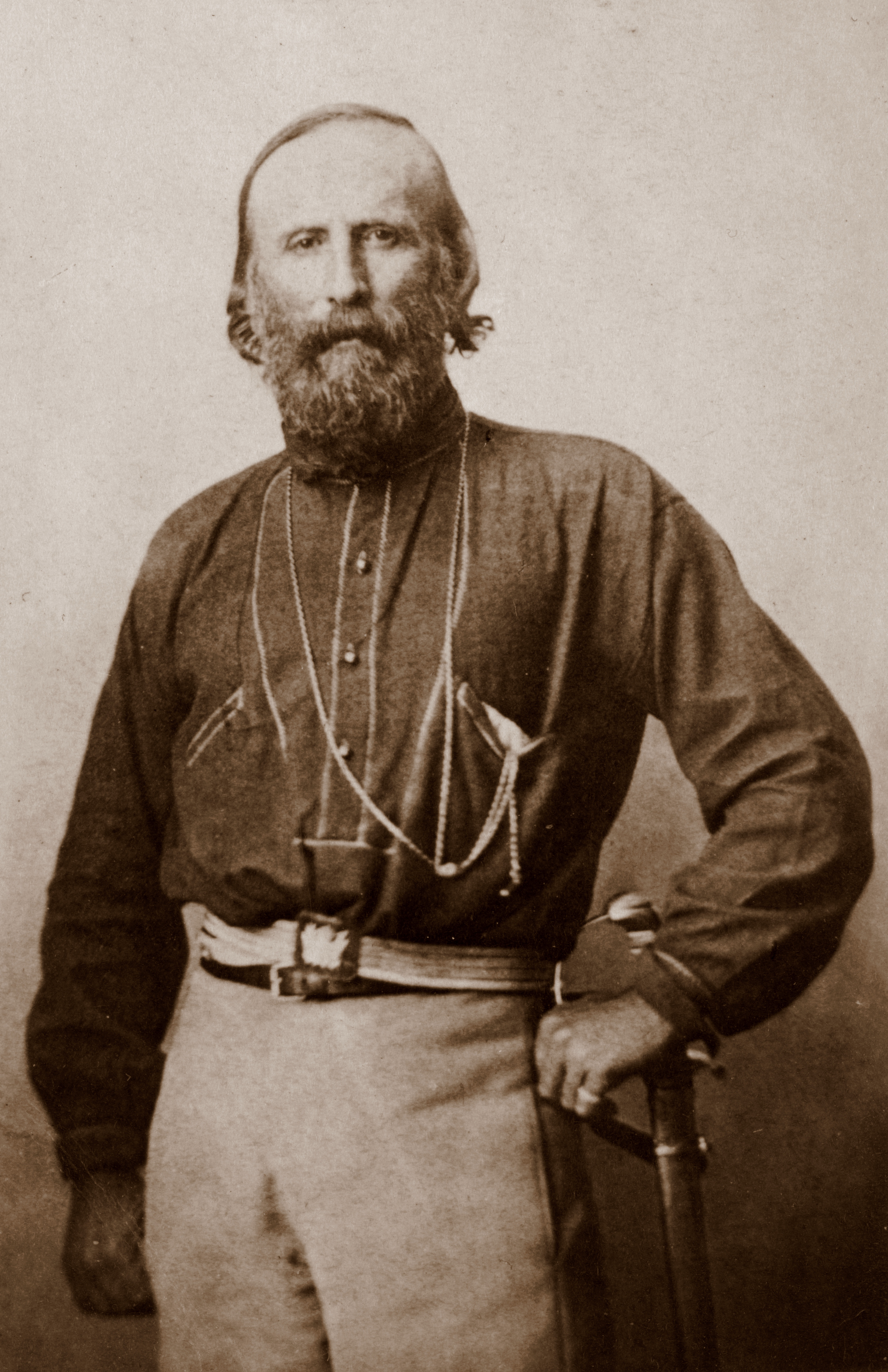
Giuseppe Garibaldi, the guest of honour at the Geneva Peace Congress and principle speaker on its first day

The Inaugural Congress began at 14:00 on 9 September 1867, in the Palais Electoral in Geneva. It was attended by 6,000 people, most of whom came from Geneva. The Congress appointed an organisational bureau, on which every nationality would be represented by two delegates; the Swiss democrat Pierre Jolissaint was elected as its president. The Congress then agreed on its "preliminary manifesto", which set as its goal the establishment of peace between European nations and a Federal Europe.

The guest of honour, the Italian delegate Giuseppe Garibaldi, was the first to speak. He put forward a twelve-point programme, proposing that: any disputes between nations should now be ajudicated by the Congress; that the Papacy be abolished and that the Congress adopt and preach a "religion of truth and reason"; that only democratic republics could achieve peace; and that every nationality maintained a right of self-defense. Delegates from the Lausanne Congress of the IWA then spoke, proclaiming that inter-state wars could only be solved through the abolition of class stratification and capitalism. Russian anarchist Mikhail Bakunin spoke next, declaring that the main thing preventing international peace was nationalism, as maintained by the existing order of large, centralised states. He believed this to be the main obstacle to the United States of Europe, due to the inherent imbalance of power between large and small states, and thus that larger states would have to be overthrown.

As the Congress went on, debates about the social question and religion caused relations between the radical and conservative delegates to break down. To resolve the disputes, the organisational bureau put forward a resolution that omitted any objectionable content. With a view to establishing peace in Europe, on the basis of liberty and democracy, the Congress established the League of Peace and Freedom, with a central committee to run the organisation between annual congresses. It called on every member of the League to shape public opinion against the ignorance and prejudices that caused war, agitate for the abolition of standing armies and their replacement with a militia system, and to improve the welfare of the working and propertless classes.

== First Committee (1867-1868) ==
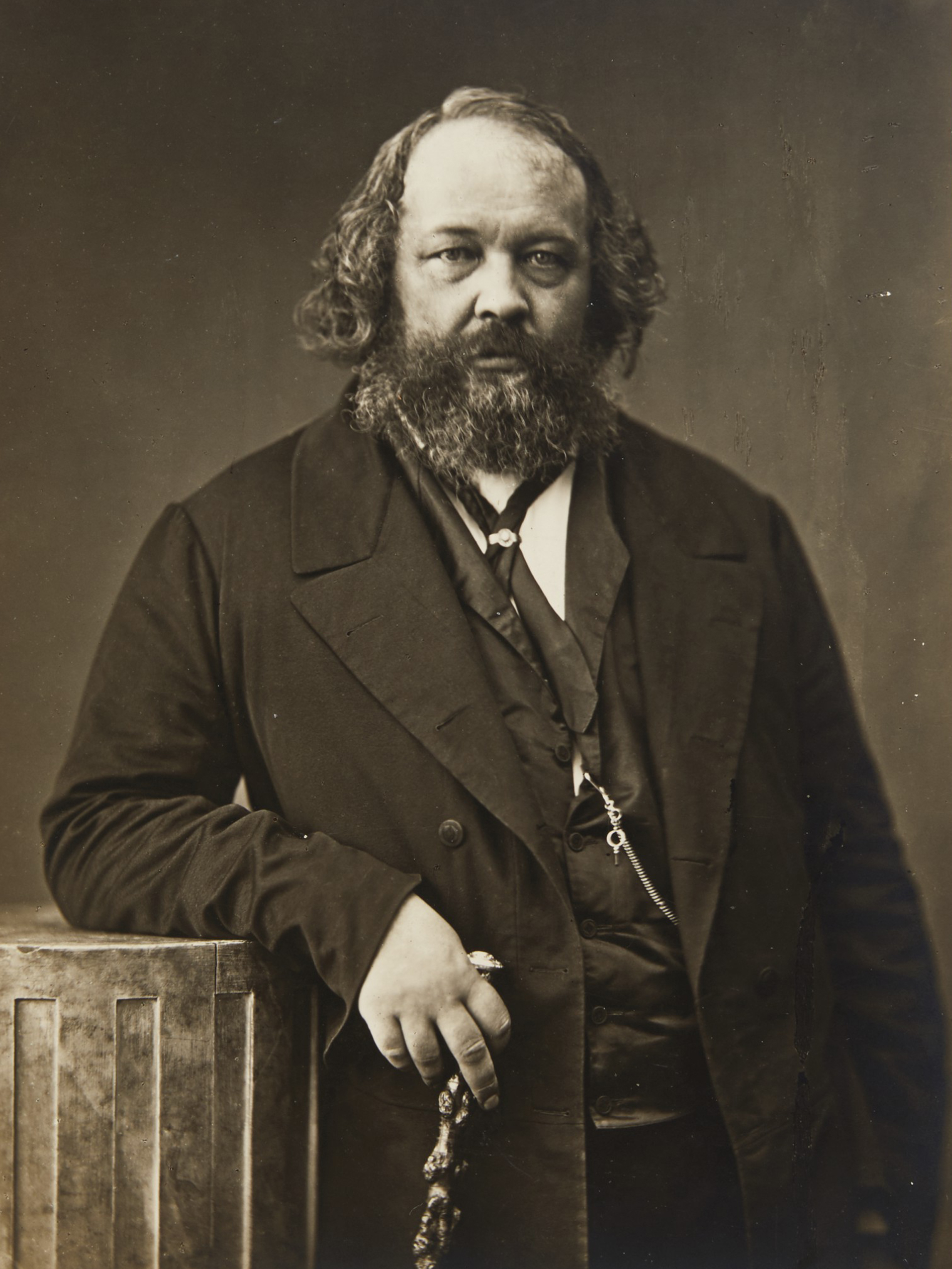
Mikhail Bakunin, leader of the left-wing of the League's executive committee

After the Congress, the League's new executive committee began meeting in Bern. It published The United States of Europe (French: Les Etats-Unis d'Europe), a weekly newspaper published in French and German. Its president was Gustav Vogt and consisted of two representatives for each nationality. The left-wing of the committee was led by Mikhail Bakunin, and also consisted of the Polish delegates Walery Mroczkowski and Włodzimierz Zagórski, and Russian delegate Nikolay Zhukovsky. The right-wing was formed by its French, Italian and Swiss delegations. The English delegates Randal Cremer and George Odger were largely unable to attend meetings, as they did not have the funding to travel the distance between England and Switzerland. The German delegates often fell into infighting, which prevented them from forming a voting bloc.

Mikhail Bakunin's voice dominated the committee meetings, to the chagrin of Vogt, who complained of the anarchist's obscurantism. In the committee's first meeting, Bakunin proposed the adoption of his draft manifesto Federalism, Socialism, and Anti-Theologism as the League's official programme, but he was ultimately unable to convince the majority of the committee to adopt it, and the manifesto remained unfinished and unpublished. He managed to pass a motion for the committee to reject religion and adopt a humanist conception of morality and justice, but his motion for "a radical transformation of the economic position of the working class" was defeated by a single vote by Vogt. His proposal that the organisation be renamed to the "Democratic and Republican League for Peace and Freedom" was defeated by a large majority. At the committee's second meeting, on 31 May 1868, it began making preparations for the League's second congress, which they decided would be held in Bern in September of that year. The committee also adopted a radical three-point programme put forward by Bakunin, which called for: freedom of religion, the separation of church and state and the establishment of a secular education system; the creation of a United States of Europe as a federation of autonomous and self-governing municipalities and regions, on the basis of equality before the law; and an equitable redistribution of wealth, the division of the working day into time for labour, leisure and education, and the abolition of social classes. The third point closely paraphrased Karl Marx's own programme for the IWA.

With the programmes of the League and the IWA beginning to align, in June 1868, Bakunin joined the IWA and began laying plans for an alliance between the two organisations, with himself assuming leadership of both. He proposed that the League could be the political counterpart to the IWA's socio-economic organisation, with the League's aim being to explore how to resolve the social question through political means. At the committee's third meeting in August 1868, it approved Bakunin's proposal for an alliance between the League and the IWA. Vogt sent out letters of invitation for the upcoming Bern Congress, including to members of the IWA, which was preparing for its Brussels Congress. Bakunin personally invited IWA members Johann Philipp Becker and César De Paepe, and sent a letter to the Brussels Congress laying out his "programme of Russian social democracy". Bakunin was enthusiastic about a resolution of the Brussels Congress, which had called for the abolition of class stratification and hereditary property; he believed that the political implementation of this would necessitate the transformation of existing state structures. But the IWA proved to be apathetic towards the League's overtures, with Karl Marx dismissing the League as the "Geneva wind-bag". The Brussels Congress rejected the invitation for an alliance and passed a resolution calling for the League to dissolve itself into the IWA. Bakunin was castigated by other members of the League, including Vogt, for the failed attempt at establishing an alliance. Bakunin himself blamed Marx for the decision of the Brussels Congress and promised he would speak on behalf of the committee to respond to the IWA's "insolent proposal". In a letter to Vogt, sent on 16 September, Bakunin assured him that he had no intention of dissolving the League into the IWA but still hoped they could unify their objectives while remaining separate organisations with their own individual focuses.

== Bern Congress (1868) ==
Gustave Chaudey, the principle opponent of Bakunin's collectivist programme at the Bern Congress

On 21 September 1868, the League's Second Congress assembled in the Swiss capital of Bern. It was attended by only 100 delegates, substantially fewer than the preceding congress; the delegates were predominantly "bourgeois", in contrast with the radicalism of the central committee. At Karl Marx's direction, the IWA did not send an official delegation, although some of its members attended in an individual capacity, still hoping to build an alliance between the two. The Congress began with a reading of a letter from eight imprisoned IWA members. The Congress was presided over by the French author Victor Hugo and among its attendees were Giuseppe Garibaldi and Jules Favre. A number of women were also in attendance, including Virginie Barbet, who represented a group of social democratic women from Lyon. Bakunin circulated his manifesto, Federalism, Socialism and Anti-Theologism, ahead of the congress, aiming to influence it towards his goals.

At the Bern Congress, the social question again caused a fierce debate, with Bakunin's attempt to radicalise the League dominating the proceedings. The Proudhonist Gustave Chaudey, who was attending the congress as a raporteur for the German socialist Karl Grün, argued against the League adopting the demands of the IWA. He believed that international peace and federalism were necessary prerequisites for working-class emancipation, rather than the other way around. He proposed that the League focus on the development of a federalist political and economic system, which he believed would be favourable to the workers' aspirations. Bakunin countered with his belief that peace and freedom were not possible without first achieving social equality, and that the League therefore needed to discuss methods to bring it about. He called for the League to abandon bourgeois and classist attitudes, and to endorse the radical socialist principles advocated by the IWA. The Blanquist Victor Jaclard identified himself even more closely with the IWA's proposals regarding the abolition of private property, citing Proudhon's own views on the subject, and criticised Chaudey's tacit endorsement of existing property arrangements as "monopolistic". Chaudey responded by saying he was more familiar with Proudhon's work than Jaclard and again called for the League to focus on other matters, emphasising that the Congress had not been called to discuss the issue of property ownership.

On the third day of the congress, Bakunin and the committee pushed forward their programme of radical change to the existing economic system, but they found that Bakunin's influence did not extend to the League's rank-and-file membership. He therefore put forward a relatively moderately-worded resolution, which declared peace and freedom to be "unobtainable" without the abolition of class stratification, but left open the methods for settling the social question. Speaking in favour of the motion, Bakunin proclaimed himself in accordance with the programme of the IWA and on the side of socialism. He declared that, if the Congress failed to take the side of social justice for the working class, then the workers would likewise refuse to associate with them, and the League would lose all popular support for its programme. Bakunin's speech drew criticism, with some delegates accusing him of being a communist. He denied the accusations, proclaiming that he hated communism because it concentrated power and property in the hands of the state; in contrast, he declared his desire for the abolition of the state and all forms of authority and private property. Instead, Bakunin put forward his vision for society to be organised from the bottom-up, on the basis of free association, and for all property to be held under collective or social ownership. He expressed regret for using the communist terminology regarding the "equalisation of classes", clarifying that he believed social classes and inequalities should be abolished entirely, as the overturning of existing property relations would give way to an equality of opportunity and set the groundwork for a new social order. He concluded by characterising his economic views as collectivism; according to E. H. Carr, this speech was also Bakunin's first public articulation of anarchist principles.

Bakunin's resolution on social equality was ultimately defeated by a majority of the delegates: the delegations from Britain, France, Germany, Mexico, Spain, Switzerland and Sweden voted against it, while the delegations from Italy, Poland, Russia and the United States voted in favour. The Russian positivist Grigory Vyrubov believed that the resolution likely would have been passed, had Bakunin not chosen to speak in its favour. Despite this setback, Bakunin was convinced to remain at the Congress while it debated the issues of religion and nationalism. On the former, the Congress called for the separation of church and state, believing that this was the only relationship between the two that was compatible with democracy and civil liberty, and proposed that secular education be provided for free by the state. In Bakunin's speech on the issue, he declared that education was insufficient to overturn religious superstitions, which he believed necessitated a social revolution.

On the fourth day of the congress, discussion turned towards nationalism and federalism. A brief speech by Walery Mroczkowski on the subject was followed by another lengthy diatribe by Bakunin. Bakunin proclaimed the Russian Empire to be the world's greatest threat to freedom and called for its destruction. He declared himself in opposition to Russian imperialism, recognising the right to self-determination of Estonia, Finland, Latvia, Lithuania, Poland and Ukraine. He even called for Russians themselves to be granted a form of self-determination by decentralising the Russian state down to the regional and municipal levels. Bakunin's understanding of self-determination separated the concept of the "nation" from that of the state. Bakunin declared that it would be naive for the Congress to call for international justice, peace and freedom, while also accepting the preservation of the state. He proclaimed that all states were inherently evil, as they rested on the negation of freedom and justice. He directly compared the atrocities openly committed by the Russian Empire with those committed covertly by other European states, which he said were only held back by the forces of public opinion and working class solidarity. He therefore called on German delegates to renounce their own territorial claims over Poland, as well as Schleswig and Trieste, and to recognise their right to independence. He concluded by calling for all who advocated for peace and freedom to support the destruction of all states and their replacement with a global federation based on free association. His advocacy of decentralisation went even further from regions and municipalities, down to the individual level.

On the final day of the Congress (25 September), Bakunin handed in a Collective Protest by delegates from the radical left-wing minority, which condemned the congressional majority's pronunciations against social equality and declared that they would be leaving the League in protest. Bakunin gave the League an ultimatum to either declare themselves in favour of abolishing class stratification or admit to their support of social inequality. According to Bakunin, Gustave Chaudey responded by removing the word "equality" entirely from the League's programme. The document contained 15 signatures, including: the Russian delegates Mikhail Bakunin and Nikolay Zhukovsky, the Polish delegates Walery Mroczkowski and Włodzimierz Zagórski, the French delegates Elisée Reclus, Aristide Rey, Albert Richard and Virginie Barbet, and the Swiss delegate James Guillaume. Three others, including Nikolai Utin, co-signed the manifesto at a later date, bringing the total number of resignations to 18. Bakunin declared that the League's "bourgeois" sentiments had made it into a "laughing stock", and that a better place for a revolutionary would be in the IWA. Bakunin and his comrades thus split from the League and established the International Alliance of Socialist Democracy (AIDS), which later merged into the IWA. In a letter to Marx in December 1868, Bakunin declared that his experiences at the Bern Congress had forced him to finally break with the bourgeoisie and align with Marx's own views regarding the primacy of economic struggle over political reform. According to historian Edward Castleton, this marked the moment that Bakunin became a "founding father" of anarchism.

Following the Bakunin group's resignation, Chaudey reaffirmed his opposition to their attempts to subvert the League for radical aims. In a letter to Gustave Courbet, Chaudey bragged about defeating Bakunin in "hand-to-hand-combat" and reconstituting the League "on a serious and robust foundation". Relitigating previous debates they had over Proudhonist economic theory, Chaudey denounced Bakunin's platform of collectivism as "a new word for the old tune of communism". Chaudey also criticised Bakunin for reducing the concept of federalism to a "pure abstraction" outside the realms of reality.

== Lausanne Congress (1869) ==
The League's Third Congress was held in Lausanne, from 14 to 18 September 1869. It was attended by a small number of Swiss delegates and presided over by Victor Hugo. In a speech to the Congress, Hugo declared that eliminating tyranny, standing armies and monarchy would "open the door" to the establishment of a continental European Republic. Debates about the social question continued, with French IWA members Charles Longuet and Ernest Édouard Fribourg insisting that the League address the issue. Gustave Chaudey responded with mockery, saying they were acting as though France was already a decentralised, constitutional republic under the direction of the League. Chaudey argued that the League needed to focus on the implementation of mutualism and called for an end to discussions of the social question, which he worried would lead to the same "class baiting" which had characterised Bakunin's interventions in previous congresses; he believed discussions of the social question ought be left to those who claimed to represent the working class, until they had a concrete proposal for the League.

== Collapse ==
The outbreak of the Franco-Prussian War in 1870 resulted in the effective collapse of the League. The League became increasingly more moderate, with its discussions de-emphasising its previously held policies of decentralisation, federalism and self-governance, and focusing instead on promoting international law. Although the League condemned the German annexation of Alsace-Lorraine and called for Alsatian self-determination, it also forced the League to abandon its aims of peace and the establishment of a United States of Europe. League member Gustave Chaudey was killed during the subsequent suppression of the Paris Commune in March 1871, having defended the insurrectionary communes from the same position of federalism he had advocated in the League's congresses.

In the wake of the war, the League held another congress, between 25 and September 1871. There, when André Léo attempted to draw attention to the repression that had resulted in Chaudey's execution, she was jeered by delegates, who came out in support of the government of Adolphe Thiers. In 1874, when the League attempted to hold another peace congress in Geneva, Victor Hugo declined the invitation, expressing his belief that peace was no longer possible and that international justice would need to be promoted instead. Belgian lawyer Gustave Rolin-Jaequemyns likewise commented that the League's programme of peace and freedom was "absurd" under the present circumstances and called for something more tangible to take its place.

== Legacy ==
The League's executive committee later reorganised into the International Bureau of Peace, which maintained its seat in Bern, before moving to Geneva in the early 1930s. In the decades after the League's collapse, the idea of uniting Europe and establishing peace on the continent fell dormant. It was later revived at the turn of the 20th century, with the publication of The Federation of Europe by Russian writer Yakov Novikov and with the Hague Conventions of 1899 and 1907. E. H. Carr described the League as a "naive experiment in international pacifism", one which had anticipated the League of Nations. Historiography of the First International often overlooks the League and the role of Mikhail Bakunin within it.

== See also ==
- List of anti-war organizations

== Bibliography ==
- Abrams, Irwin Martin (1938). A History of European Peace Societies (PDF) (PhD thesis). Harvard University.
- Aleksoska, Natasha (2013). "Overview of the Projects for the Unification of Europe to the Vision of Victor Hugo for the United States of Europe". EVRODIJALOG Journal for European Issues (18): 147–159. ISSN 1857-6222.
- Baltazar, Isabel (2021). "The European Union is at a crossroads: An Europe of different speeds? A study of the history of European unity". Debater a Europa (25): 13–38. doi:10.14195/1647-6336_25_1. hdl:10316/113441. ISSN 1647-6336.
- Carr, E. H. (1935). "The League of Peace and Freedom: An Episode in the Quest for Collective Security". International Affairs. 14 (6): 837–844. doi:10.2307/2601913. JSTOR 2601913.
- Carr, E. H. (1975) [1937]. Michael Bakunin. London: Macmillan Press. doi:10.1007/978-1-349-02632-6. ISBN 978-1349026326. OCLC 1004387682. SBN 333 18425 4.
- Castleton, Edward (2017). "The origins of 'collectivism': Pierre-Joseph Proudhon's contested legacy and the debate about property in the International Workingmen's Association and the League of Peace and Freedom". Global Intellectual History. 2 (2): 169–195. doi:10.1080/23801883.2017.1350114.
- Durand, André (1996). "Gustave Moynier and the peace societies". International Review of the Red Cross (314): 532–550. doi:10.1017/S0020860400076129. ISSN 1560-7755. Archived from the original on 20 February 2009.
- Ijabs, Ivars (2012). "The Nation of the Socialist Intelligentsia: The National Issue in the Political Thought of Early Latvian Socialism". East Central Europe. 39 (2–3): 181–203. doi:10.1163/18763308-03903002.
- Marshall, Peter H. (2008) [1992]. Demanding the Impossible: A History of Anarchism. London: Harper Perennial. ISBN 978-0-00-686245-1. OCLC 218212571.
- Ostrowski, Marius S. (2018). "League of Peoples or League of States: An Investigation". Eduard Bernstein on Social Democracy and International Politics. Palgrave Macmillan. doi:10.1007/978-3-319-70781-5_16.
- Pacillo, Vincenzo (2024). Secularism in French Cultural Discourse: Timeless Laïcité. Cambridge Scholars Publishing. ISBN 9781036414153.
- Schrupp, Antje (2018). "Bringing Together Feminism and Socialism in the First International". In Bensimon, Fabrice; Quentin, Deluermoz; Moisand, Jeanne (eds.). Arise Ye Wretched of the Earth": The First International in a Global Perspective. Studies in Global Social History. Vol. 29. Brill. pp. 343–354. doi:10.1163/9789004335462_023. ISBN 978-90-04-33546-2.
