= International Peace Conference =

2005 event in London

The International Peace Conference was an anti-war conference held on December 10, 2005. It was organised by the Stop the War Coalition (StWC), and included speakers from Iraq, the United States, and Italy.

The conference sold out a week before its occurrence, leaving many people who wished to attend the conference disappointed. 1,500 tickets were sold for the event, which was held in the Royal Horticultural Hall in Vincent Square, London. The conference began at 10 a.m. and ended at 8 p.m. 33 people spoke from the platform in four different sessions. In an unusual move, media organisations were made to pay to attend the conference. According to a StWC spokesperson, this was because the coalition had little funds, and the conference was costing £25,000 to put on.

The conference was opened by the veteran Labour Party campaigner Tony Benn. Benn told the conference delegates that the anti-war movement which is calling for troops to be withdrawn from Iraq is the biggest he had seen in this lifetime.

Other speakers included Cindy Sheehan, the American anti-war activist whose son died in Iraq, who spoke in a session alongside other relatives of soldiers who have died in Iraq, including Reg Keys and Rose Gentle from Military Families Against the War. There were also speakers from Iraq representing different Iraqi groups that oppose the military occupation. Hassan Juma, president of the Iraqi Southern Oil Workers Union, condemned what he claimed were attempts by America to asset-strip Iraq through privatizing its services. Sheikh Hussein al Zagani, a representative of Muqtada al-Sadr was due to speak at the conference, but was denied a visa by the UK government. This move was condemned by the conference.

George Galloway, the Respect Party politician, ended the conference in which he urged people to build for a planned international demonstration on March 18, 2006.
