= James Galloway =

James or Jim Galloway may refer to:

- James Galloway (physician) (1862–1922), physician and dermatologist
- James Galloway (footballer) (1893–1918), Scottish footballer
- James Galloway (film editor) (1928–1996), film editor
- James Galloway (rower) (born 1964), Australian rower
- James Gilvray Galloway (1828–1860), Scots-Australian trade unionist
- James M. Galloway, American doctor
- Jim Galloway (baseball) (1887–1950), American baseball player
- Jim Galloway (soccer), Canadian soccer player
- James N. Galloway, American biogeochemist
- Jim Galloway (1936–2014), Canadian jazz musician
- Jim Galloway (golfer), golfer from New Zealand in New Zealand Open

== See also ==
- James Galway, flautist
