= George E. McNeill =

Labor leader, and writer

- Born: August 4, 1836; Amesbury, Massachusetts
- Died: May 17, 1906 (aged 69); Somerville, Massachusetts
- Occupations: Labor leader, journalist, insurance company executive
- Notable work: The Labor Movement, or, the Problem of To-day

George Edwin McNeill (1836–1906), was an American mill worker, labor leader, Christian socialist, and writer from New England. McNeill is best remembered for a pioneering study of the American labor movement, The Labor Movement, or, the Problem of To-day, published in 1892.

== Biography ==
=== Early years ===
George Edwin McNeill was born August 4, 1836, in Amesbury, Massachusetts. McNeill worked in various Amesbury textile mills from childhood, going to work in the Amesbury Woolen Company at the age of ten. This led McNeill to participation in an 1851 strike, when he was a boy of just 15. Strikers demanded a shortening of the working day to 10 hours at the mill, which the owner, the Salisbury Company, refused. When McNeill and the other workers abandoned their posts, mill owners terminated the employment of all, hiring a new crew of 50 Irish immigrants to operate the machinery of the facility.

Needing to find a new line of employment after termination in the strike, McNeill apprenticed as a shoemaker, learning that craft and moving to Boston in 1856.

=== Career ===
In Boston, McNeill became politically active and joined the Sons of Temperance, serving multiple times as an officer in that organization. He also became involved in the movement to institute the 8-hour day, co-founding the Grand Eight Hour League in Boston in 1863. This organization would change its name in 1868 to the Boston Eight Hour League. McNeill would serve as president of the Eight Hour League for eight years, taking part in that capacity in the successful lobbying of the state legislature for passage of a 10-hour day law in Massachusetts.

McNeill was the founder of the Working Men's Institute in Boston, and worked with abolitionist Wendell Phillips and Massachusetts Governor William Claflin to establish the Massachusetts Bureau of Statistics of Labor, the first labor bureau in the United States. Upon that body's formation he was named deputy chief by Governor Claflin.

McNeill became involved with the Sovereigns of Industry and was elected Massachusetts State Secretary of that organization. He was also involved in pioneer labor newspapers throughout the Northeastern United States, including the New York Labor Standard, the Fall River Labor Standard, and the Boston Voice, among others. He was also the founder of the Boston Labor Leader.

In 1874, McNeill served as a delegate to the Industrial Congress in Rochester, New York for which he wrote a declaration of principles which was later adopted by the Knights of Labor. He would himself join the Knights in 1883, assuming a prominent role in the leadership of District 30, the largest division of that organization. In 1884 he was elected Treasurer of District 30.

During this era there were few job safety rules and no provision for state workmen's compensation in the event of on the job accidents; insurance was frequently expensive and impossible for the working class to obtain. Consequently, in 1883 McNeill founded the Massachusetts Accident Company, designed to provide low cost insurance to factory workers in the state.

McNeill became directly involved in electoral politics in 1886, running as a labor candidate for Mayor of Boston.

McNeill studied the world of organized labor extensively and was the editor of and a contributor to the 1892 book, The Labor Movement, or, the Problem of To-day, regarded as one of the first comprehensive histories of the American labor movement.

A Christian socialist, McNeill was an active member of the Episcopal Christian Socialist Church of the Carpenter in Boston, becoming a senior warden of that body in 1891. He was a staunch Democrat in politics and was active in the 1896 Presidential campaign to elect William Jennings Bryan.

McNeill was also a poet of some renown and published a 1903 volume of his literary work.

=== Death and legacy ===
On May 17, 1906, McNeill was suddenly stricken by intestinal pain and was rushed to the hospital in Somerville, Massachusetts. An emergency operation was conducted, but McNeill was unable to survive the trauma, and he faded and died on May 19, 1906. McNeill was 69 years old at the time of his death.

Numerous leaders of the American labor movement were in attendance at his funeral, with the eulogy delivered by Samuel Gompers, President of the American Federation of Labor.

== See also ==
- Eight-Hour Leagues

== Works ==
- Factory Children: Report upon the Schooling and Hours of Labor of Children Employed in the Manufacturing and Mechanical Establishments of Massachusetts. Boston: Wright and Potter, 1875.
- Argument on the Hours of Labor, Delivered before the Labor Committee of the Massachusetts Legislature. New York: Labor Standard Publishing Co., n.d. [1870s].
- An Argument in Favor of a Legislative Enactment to Abolish the Tenement-House cigar factories in New York and Brooklyn. New York: n.p., 1882.
- The Labor Movement: The Problem of To-Day. New York: M.W. Hazen Co., 1892.
- Evolution in the Boot and Shoe Industry. Boston: n.p., n.d. [1890s].
- A Study of Accidents and Accident Insurance. Boston: Insurance Topics Co., 1900.
- "The Democracy of Labor Organization," The Arena, vol. 1, whole no. 1, pp. 69–81.
- Unfrequented Paths: Songs of Nature, Labor and Men. Boston: J.H. West Co., 1903. —poetry
- The Eight Hour Primer: The Fact, Theory and the Argument: Questions to the Unemployed, the Employed, the Employer, the Capitalist, the Clergyman, and the Observer. Washington, DC: American Federation of Labor, 1907.

Trade union offices
Preceded by Jeremiah Sullivan; Adolph Strasser	American Federation of Labor delegate to the Trades Union Congress; 1897; With: Martin Fox	Succeeded by James Duncan; Henry Demarest Lloyd
