= Ira Steward =

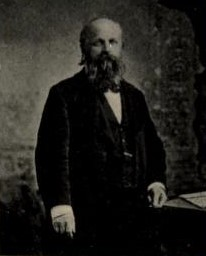
- Born: 1831
- Died: March 13, 1883 (aged 51–52)
- Known for: Machinist, Philosopher of Eight Hour Movement
- Notable work: The Eight Hour Movement: A Reduction of Hours Is an Increase in Wages (1865)
- Movement: Eight Hour Leagues

Ira Steward (1831–1883) was a key figure in labor movement in the United States during the late 19th century. He is best known as a leading advocate of the eight-hour work day. The effect would need to open jobs for more workers, and open new hours of leisure.

== Machinists' and Blacksmiths' Union ==
Though little is known of Steward's early life, he became more involved with the labor movement while working twelve hours a day as a machinist's apprentice. He would go on to use this working experience as a means to garner sympathy and credibility in the movement while speaking at labor union meetings, taking part in strikes and publishing pamphlets.

On the recommendation of Steward, the Machinists' and Blacksmiths' Union (to which he belonged) sent resolutions to the Boston Trades' Assembly, urging for a concentration on reduction of hours for working individuals.

Not satisfied with the efforts of the Boston Trades' Assembly in approaching the issue, Steward joined several other former Machinists' and Blacksmiths' Union members in forming the Labor Reform Association, which in 1865 would be reconstituted into the Grand Eight Hour League of Massachusetts.

== Grand Eight Hour League ==
Eight-Hour Leagues were established in cities all over the United States, with some politicians adopting a pro Eight-hour day stance and state-wide leagues forming in some cases. State laws for Eight-hour days were passed in several states including Illinois, New York and Connecticut, and city councils in Boston, Baltimore, Detroit and New York amongst others passed ordinances extending the eight-hour day to their employees. In 1868, government employees were granted the eight-hour day as a result of a law enacted by Congress.

Enforcement of the laws, however, was ineffective at best. In many cases workers were faced with the choice of either accepting longer work hours or striking. In reaction to a shift of emphasis that he saw as detrimental to the cause (from working hours to monetary issues), Steward served on the arrangements committee of the short-lived New England Labor Reform League, which split into two separate movements.

Steward said the greatest threat to overall prosperity was the poverty of workers, who competed with each other so as to lower the wage rate. The poverty of the many produced a state of stupefaction for the relentless toil primarily benefited the employers. Unity and struggle—especially the strike—was the tool but the goal was an eight hour day which would generate a revolution of rising expectations and ambitions, he argued.

== See also ==
- Eight-Hour Leagues
- International Labor Union
- Organized labor

== Sources ==
- Cahill, Marion Cotter. Shorter Hours: A Study of the Movement Since the Civil War (1932)
  - Maher, Amy G. "Shorter Hours: A Study of the Movement since the Civil War." Social Service Review 77#2 (1933), pp. 345–347 online
- Green, William. "The Five Day Week." The North American Review 223.833 (1926): 566-574. online
- Douglas, Dorothy W., "Ira Steward on Consumption and Employment" Journal of Political Economy 40 (1932): 532-543
- Kuritz, Hyman. "Ira Steward and the Eight Hour Day" Science & Society 20 (1956): 118-134
