= James Stephens (trade unionist) =

- 1889 engraving
- Born: 8 August 1821; Chepstow, Monmouthshire, Wales
- Died: 14 November 1889 (aged 68); Carlton, Melbourne, Victoria
- Occupations: Stonemason, Chartist, trade unionist
- Known for: Involvement in eight-hour day movement

James Stephens (8 August 1821 – 14 November 1889) was a Welsh-born stonemason, Chartist, and Australian trade unionist who was active in the eight-hour day movement in the 1850s.

== Early life and work in Britain ==
Stephens was born in Chepstow, Monmouthshire in south east Wales and, like his father (also James Stephens), became a stonemason. As a youth, he moved from Chepstow to nearby Newport, then a stronghold of formative Chartism. Stephens joined the Masons' Society in 1839, and later that year was seriously injured in a fall of thirty feet while working.

He joined the Chartist movement and was one of the participants in the Newport Rising, which led to a riot and retaliation at the Westgate Hotel on 4 November 1839 when soldiers fired on the crowd of rebels, killing twenty. Stephens was 'severely handled' but escaped to London. He worked as a stonemason at Windsor Castle but was dismissed when it became known that he was a Chartist. Working on the new Houses of Parliament in Westminster, he found himself among like-minded people. He remained active in Chartism, carried the banner at rallies, and was acquainted with such leaders as William Lovett and Feargus O'Connor, but like many other supporters of the cause increasingly directed his energies to craft unionism. He became a prominent leader of the masons, acquiring a wide experience as a union organiser. He married Eliza Cuthbert when living in London.

== Activities in Australia ==
When the Australian gold rush created an enormous demand for tradesmen and builders, Stephens, like many other Chartists, migrated to Victoria, arriving in July 1853. He continued working as a stonemason. In February 1855, the Operative Masons' Society, which had been suspended, was resuscitated, and, with James Gilvray Galloway, Stephens formed a local branch. This meeting is seen as the genesis of the "eight-hour day movement".

Many of the employers agreed to support the masons' demands. Stephens, using the language of the Chartists, proposed to persuade the recalcitrant by 'physical force' if necessary and to coerce the non-unionists; but a meeting of employers and operatives resolved that the eight-hour day must come into force in April 1856. On the "glorious 21 April" Stephens walked off his work as a stonemason helping to construct Melbourne University, and led a major demonstration to Parliament House. He wrote: "It was a burning hot day and I thought the occasion a good one, so I called upon the men to follow me, to which they immediately consented, when I marched them … to Parliament House, the men … dropping their tools and joining the procession".

The campaign was successful, and the employers agreed that the stonemasons would receive the same pay for eight hours work as they previously received for ten. On 12 May 1856, the stonemasons, joined by other workers, marched in celebration to Cremorne Gardens in what became known as the 8 Hours Procession. The date became a paid public holiday in Victoria in 1879, and the procession continued each year until the early 1950s. After its early successes in Australia and New Zealand, campaigns for the "eight hour day" continued around the world through the later 19th century, and the system was eventually widely adopted.

== Later life ==
Stephens remained an active trade unionist for a while, serving as Treasurer of the Trades Hall Committee in Melbourne from 1859 to 1861, but later claimed that he was blacklisted by his former colleagues for supporting sub-contracting, of which the unions disapproved. His public work reduced as a result and Stephens was largely forgotten, being regarded by the Operative Masons' Society as secondary to Galloway – who had died at the early age of 32 in 1860 – in having initiated the eight-hour agitation.

In 1880, Stephens wrote a pamphlet which asserted his claim to be the originator of the eight hours movement in Victoria, and downplayed the role of Galloway. He received a mixture of support and opposition, and founded the Eight Hours Pioneers' Association with another early protagonist, Ben Douglass, who was active in the Victorian Trades Hall Council. By 1883, Stephens was living with his wife but had been injured in another fall, was frail and almost blind, and destitute. The Trades Hall mounted an appeal on his behalf, which raised over £500.

== Death ==
He suffered from Bright's disease and died at his home in Carlton, Melbourne, in 1889, aged 68. He was buried at Melbourne General Cemetery.

== Memorials ==
A biography, Bluestone: The Story of James Stephens, by journalist Clive Turnbull, was published in 1945. Turnbull described Stephens as "the man to whom, more than any other individual, Australians owe the conditions under which they live today."

On Labour Day 1990, a ceremony was held at Stephens' grave, to mark its restoration through a trade union fund set up to repair the graves of Victoria's labour movement pioneers.
