= Eight-Hour Leagues =

American labor-reform organization in the 1860s–1870s

- Formation: 1860s
- Founders: Ira Steward, George E. McNeill, others
- Defunct: 1880s
- Type: Labour movement
- Purpose: Eight-hour day movement

Eight Hour Leagues were local, city, and state labor-reform organizations in the United States that campaigned for the eight-hour workday. They emerged during and immediately after the American Civil War and spread rapidly in the late 1860s and early 1870s. The best-documented leagues include the Grand Eight-Hour League of Massachusetts associated with Ira Steward; Chicago's Grand Eight Hour League; the Boston Eight-Hour League; and a large Eight Hour League in New York City during the 1872 strike.

The leagues popularized the eight-hour demand as a national labor reform objective by coordinating local agitation, legislative petitions, and strike support. Their organizational model influenced later campaigns even after many leagues collapsed in the 1870s, and the eight-hour cause revived in new forms in the 1880s.

== Size and membership ==
About eighty local leagues are recorded between 1865 and 1877, with the largest concentrations in Massachusetts, Michigan, and other industrial states. In significant cities, Leagues had numerous branches, such as Chicago's Grand Eight Hour League with fourteen branches.

Many Eight Hour Leagues were local and short-lived, so quantitative membership data is sparse. The largest Eight Hour League was probably the New York City Eight Hour League, which had 21,000 dues-paying members in June 1872 during the 1872 strike.

== Organization and activities ==
Eight Hour Leagues were advocacy organizations focused on reducing working hours through legislation, public agitation, and alliance-building with trade unions and reformers. Their activities included petitions and formal communications to legislatures. For example, the Boston Eight-Hour League submitted a 1872 communication to the Massachusetts Senate urging legislation to limit labor to eight hours for mechanics and day-laborers.

== History ==
=== Origins (1860s) ===
Ira Steward, a Boston machinist and theorist of the eight-hour day, is widely credited with initiating the first coordinated league strategy in Massachusetts. Sources differ on the exact founding date: One account says the Labor Reform Association was reconstituted into the Grand Eight Hour League of Massachusetts in 1865, while another says Steward organized the Grand Eight-Hour League in 1866 as a propagandist organization with secrets, passwords, and obligations.

In Chicago, printer Andrew C. Cameron organized the Chicago Grand Eight Hour League in 1865 as a political organization independent of the major parties. It operated through fourteen branches across the city and held mass meetings to press for eight-hour reform.

In Boston, a Boston Eight-Hour League was active by 1868, and George E. McNeill served as its president from 1869 to 1874.

=== Expansion (late 1860s–1873) ===
By the late 1860s, eight-hour leagues appeared in multiple states and cities. Selig Perlman's national survey reports about eighty local eight-hour leagues in existence between 1865 and 1877, including roughly twenty in Massachusetts, eight elsewhere in New England, at least twenty-five in Michigan, four or five in Pennsylvania, about seven in Illinois, and comparable numbers in Wisconsin, with smaller numbers in Missouri, Iowa, Indiana, and California. Perlman also reports that Michigan, Illinois, Iowa, and Pennsylvania each had a state "Grand Eight-Hour League."

Despite their growth, many eight-hour leagues were unsuccessful. In 1867, California employers, led by the Pacific Mail Steamship Company, expelled all workers who had fought for eight-hour days. Employers created the Ten Hour League Society to coordinate their efforts.

In 1868, Congress enacted an eight-hour day for federal workers, which was a massive rhetorical win for the Leagues.

The leagues intersected with broader labor reform politics. The National Labor Union (NLU) was founded in 1866 and adopted a national resolution calling for an eight-hour workday; this national program reinforced local league efforts to pursue legislative reform.

=== New York City general strike (1872) ===
The 1872 New York City strike was one of the largest eight-hour actions of the era, involving more than 100,000 workers out of 150,000 in the city, including virtually all manufacturing and building workers. The Eight Hour League reportedly had 21,000 dues-paying members by June 8, 1872, and served as a citywide coordinating body. The strike's early gains were reversed after businesses formed a centralized organization to oppose the Eight Hour League, and used police pressure to threaten the arrests of anyone associated with the League. The league's influence declined sharply after the defeat.

=== Decline and demise (1873—1880s) ===
Many eight-hour leagues were short-lived. The National Labor Union folded in 1873, and Perlman reports that "practically all" of the local eight-hour leagues disappeared soon after the Panic of 1873. In Milwaukee, an Eight-Hour League formed in 1865 but dissolved during the 1870s depression, illustrating how local leagues could rise quickly and then disappear in economic contractions.

In Massachusetts, McNeill and other leaders continued to press for legal reforms. Still, contemporary accounts noted that eight-hour statutes were "rarely enforced" and employers often found ways around them, weakening the leagues' legislative strategy.

In New York City, the 1872 strike initially won gains for some trades, but a police crackdown and employer resistance reversed many of those gains, underscoring how fragile eight-hour victories could be in the early 1870s.

== Notable leagues ==
Name	Place	Year created	Notes	Refs
Grand Eight-Hour League of Massachusetts	Massachusetts (Boston-centered)	1865 or 1866	Organized by Ira Steward as a propagandist organization; part of a state-wide chain of subordinate leagues	
Boston Eight-Hour League	Boston, Massachusetts	1868	George E. McNeill served as president 1869–1874; petitioned for eight-hour legislation	
Chicago Grand Eight Hour League	Chicago, Illinois	1865	Political organization with fourteen branches, holding mass meetings for reform	
Eight Hour League of New York City	New York City, New York	by 1872	21,000 dues-paying members by June 8, 1872; tied to citywide strike of over 100,000 workers; sometimes called "North American Eight Hour League"	
Eight-Hour League of Milwaukee	Milwaukee, Wisconsin	1865	Dissolved in the 1870s depression; eight-hour agitation revived in the 1880s	
State Grand Eight-Hour Leagues	Michigan, Illinois, Iowa, Pennsylvania	by late 1860s–1870s	Reported by Perlman as state-level leagues within a broader network	

== Legacy ==
The Eight Hour Leagues helped embed the eight-hour demand in U.S. labor politics, supplying organizers, slogans, and legislative strategies that later movements adopted. Although many leagues declined in the 1870s, the eight-hour cause revived in new forms in the 1880s and remained a core labor objective into the 20th century.

By the mid-1880s, the eight-hour cause revived in new organizational forms. For example, the Federation of Organized Trades and Labor Unions (FOOTLU) called on affiliated unions to seek an eight-hour day by May 1, 1886, a major revival after the 1870s decline. This 1886 push would lead to the Haymarket affair and the creation of International Workers' Day, also known as Labor Day, on May 1st.

== See also ==
- Eight-hour day movement
- Ira Steward
- George E. McNeill
- National Labor Union
- 1872 New York City eight hour day strike
- 1913 Paterson silk strike
