= 1872 New York City eight hour day strike =

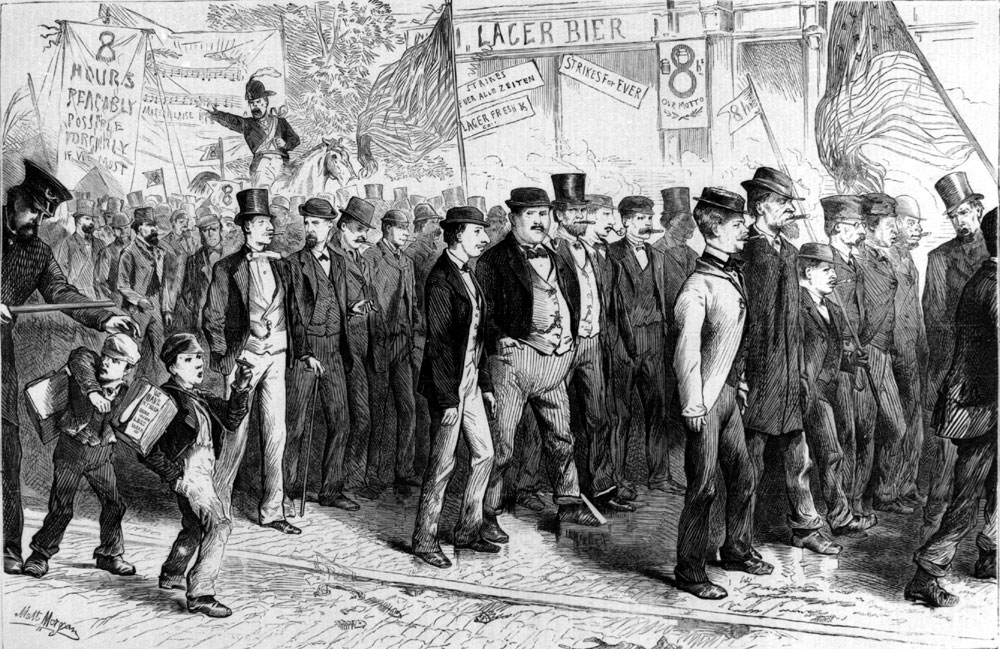
- The Eight-hour Movement. Procession of workingmen on a strike in the Bowery, June 10th, 1872
- Date: March 1872 - June 1872
- Location: New York City
- Goals: Eight-Hour Day with no reduction in pay

Parties
Workers	Employers; Police

Units involved
100,000 workers	

The 1872 New York City eight hour day strike was one of the first citywide strikes for the eight hour day in North America. More than 100,000 workers in total, across building and manufacturing trades participated in the strike. Initially it was successful in winning the eight hour day for many workers. It culminated in a 20,000 person march in the city calling for the eight hour day. However following police crackdowns on picketing and a union busting campaign by large employers, it ended in defeat, with many of the initial gains reversed by employers.

== Background ==
Prior to the strike, the start of the American Civil War in 1861 and the subsequent upswing of wartime industrial production in the North, East and West, had brought with it greater labor power among industrial workers. Initially many workers were hesitant to strike due to its potential interference with the war effort, however after facing repeated wage reductions, strikes and union organizing more broadly proliferated. This included the notable Grand Eight-Hour League. By 1863 strikes were common in many industries.

The draft of 1863 would also cause uproar among those in the Union, it gave an exemption to any who could pay $300 (equivalent to $7,845 in 2025) to avoid it, which allowed the wealthy to avoid the draft. This would lead to the New York City draft riots. The conditions of draft caused some bitterness by some white workers against the Union. Racial hatred towards free Black Americans in the north was also a prevalent issue, with many White union workers viewing them as strikebreakers during the war.

Following the defeat of the Confederacy and end of the war, the labor movement and its efforts would greatly expand in the United States, labor newspapers began popping up across the country, statewide union conventions started to be held, and pressure for a limited workday greatly increased.

In 1866, a national congress of trade unions & associations (NLU) was organized in Baltimore, on August 20, with plans to meet next year for a general convention in Chicago, Ill. During this first meeting in Baltimore a general resolution around the eight hour workday was adopted:

WHEREAS, the history and legislation of the past has demonstrated that no dependence whatever can be placed upon the pledges and professions of representatives of existing political parties, so far as the interests of the industrial classes are concerned; therefore, be it
Resolved, That the time has come when the workingmen of the United States should cut themselves loose from all party ties and organize themselves into the National Labor Party, the object of which shall be to secure the enactment of a law making eight hours a day's work.

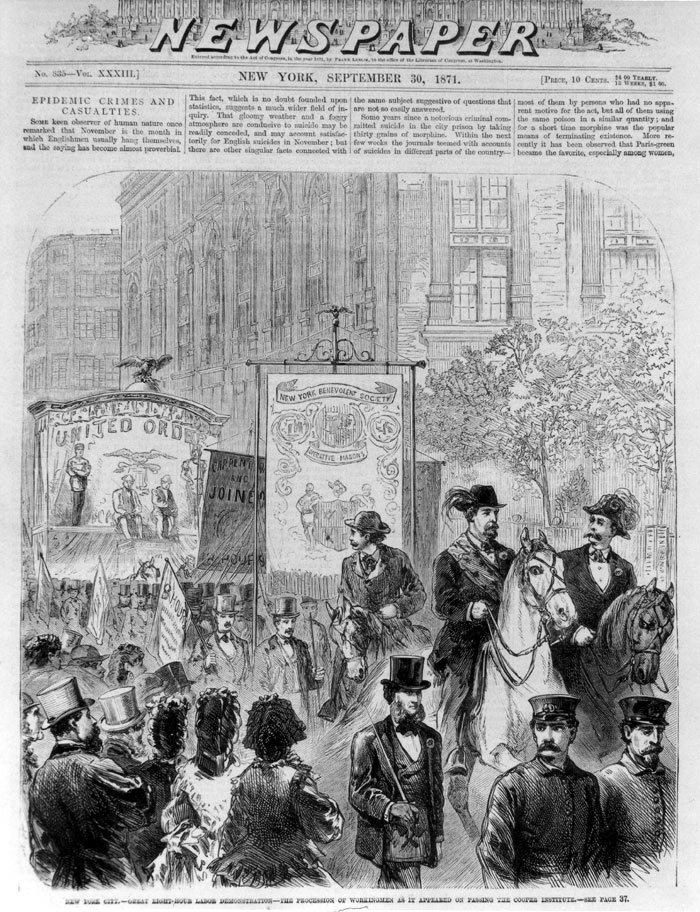
The procession of workingmen as it appeared on passing the Cooper Institute." Frank Leslie's Illustrated Newspaper, 9/30/1871

In 1869, The NLU passed a motion claiming it didn't recognize color, however black workers were largely excluded from the individual unions making up the NLU, and thus formed their own in response.

In 1868, an eight-hour day bill applying to all government workers was passed in Congress, overriding president Andrew Johnson's attempt to veto it. Its requirement was for all government workers to be paid their previous daily wage, but have their workday reduced to eight hours. However it was continually unenforced or subverted by government officials.

In 1867, the eight hour day was made law in New York, but was largely unenforced. Thus having little effect, and causing resentment among workers. Seeing the results of the Chicago general strike of 1866 for the eight hour workday, which was crushed by local militia, police and hostilely covered by press of the time; New York City workers initially avoided a strike for its enforcement and instead tried to apply pressure within the legislative system. 1870 was also a time of recession which was followed by an anti-union offensive by employers, but NYC unions survived the attack biding time.

After years of waiting and attempting a legislative solution by the fall of 1871 strikes for the eight hour day had begun in NYC. First by stone cutters who then were joined by a sympathy strike of 8,000 building trade workers. This would lead to the International Workingmen's union, NLU, Steward's Eight Hour League to organize a general strike in NYC.

== Strike ==
In early May 1872, building trades workers would strike in demand for the eight hour day. A few days later, furniture makers would join the strike. Aided by this time of the year being the busy season of the trades, employers gave into demands quickly, spurring more workers to join the general strike. By May 25, 20,000 were reported on strike.

By June 8, the Eight Hour League would have 21,000 dues paying members, and by the end of that month over 100,000 workers had participated in the city's general strike for an eight-hour day.

At first, the strike won several trades within the city the eight hour workday, including: bricklayers, carpenters, plasterers, painters, plumbers, brown and bluestone-cutters, stonemasons, masons' laborers, paper hangers, and plate printers. Smaller employers were the first to cede to the demands of striking workers, while larger manufacturers were more resistant, notably the Steinway & Sons piano manufacturing corporation. To break up pickets at their factory, William Steinway had arranged 300 policemen to guard factory gates. Steinway also had his friend Oswald Ottendorfer, and owner of city's leading German newspaper, to smear the strikers as violent and as manipulated by union agitators and communists.

While employers increased their attacks on strikers in June, workers organized a parade for June 10, to rally for the eight hour day. Around 20,000 workers reportedly participated in the march. Anti-strike papers of the time associated the march with the recent Paris Commune, and fear mongered the strikers as a violent threat.

The parade did not lead to any new victories for workers in securing the eight hour day. This was followed by some workers returning to work and a crackdown by police against the remaining picketers in the city. Police started to remove pickets with force, attacking workers with clubs. According to the New York Herald on June 17, at one sugar refinery:

The police, in their onslaught struck the men with their clubs, regardless of anything but the order they had received and the poor wretches scattered, groaning and bleeding."

That same day, the police threatened to arrest the president of the Eight Hour League, Richard Schluter. Following the police crackdown, employers heightened their union busting efforts and by the end of the month had largely clawed back the previous victories by workers for the eight hour day. Trades that had previously won the demand had it retracted by their employers and by October, only about 15,000 workers in NYC were working the eight hour day.

At the time, police in NYC were a relatively new institution, having been founded in 1845. As Nadel Stan notes, while police force against strikers would later become standard practice in breaking up strikes later in the century, at this point it was relatively new to NYC, and it played a deciding factor in the defeat of the strikers.

== Aftermath ==
=== Immediate ===
At first, the strike several trades within the city secured the eight hour workday, including: bricklayers, carpenters, plasterers, painters, plumbers, brown and bluestone-cutters, stonemasons, masons' laborers, paper hangers, and plate printers. However, after a severe police crackdown, these gains were largely reversed, ending in defeat for striking workers.

=== Long-Term ===
While unsuccessful, the strike had set a precedent for the eight hour strikes of 1886 of the Federation of Organized Trades and Labor. This movement would ultimately culminate to the Haymarket Affair in the fight for the eight hour day. Eventually the fight for the 8 hour workday would be partially won with the 1940 amendment to the Fair Labor Standards Act that mandated overtime one and a half for any time over 40 hours a week.

== See also ==
- Eight-Hour Leagues
