= James Gilvray Galloway =

Stonemason and trade unionist

- Born: 28 February 1828; Springfield, Fife, Scotland
- Died: 3 June 1860 (aged 32); Collingwood, Victoria, Australia
- Burial place: Melbourne General Cemetery
- Occupations: Stonemason, Chartist, trade unionist
- Known for: Involvement in eight-hour day movement

James Gilvray Galloway (28 February 1828 – 3 June 1860) was a Scots-born stonemason and trade unionist who was a leading figure in the successful and influential eight hour day movement in Melbourne, Australia.

== Biography ==
He was born in Springfield, Fife, Scotland. He worked as a stonemason in London, and became a supporter of the Chartists before emigrating to Melbourne in 1854. There, he joined with James Stephens to revive the local branch of the Operative Masons' Association, an early trade union. On 21 April 1856, they led a march from their construction site at the University of Melbourne to Parliament House, demanding the introduction of an eight-hour working day, for the same pay as previously for ten hours. Their employers in Victoria accepted their demands, and the eight hour day became widely accepted in Australia and started to spread around the world.

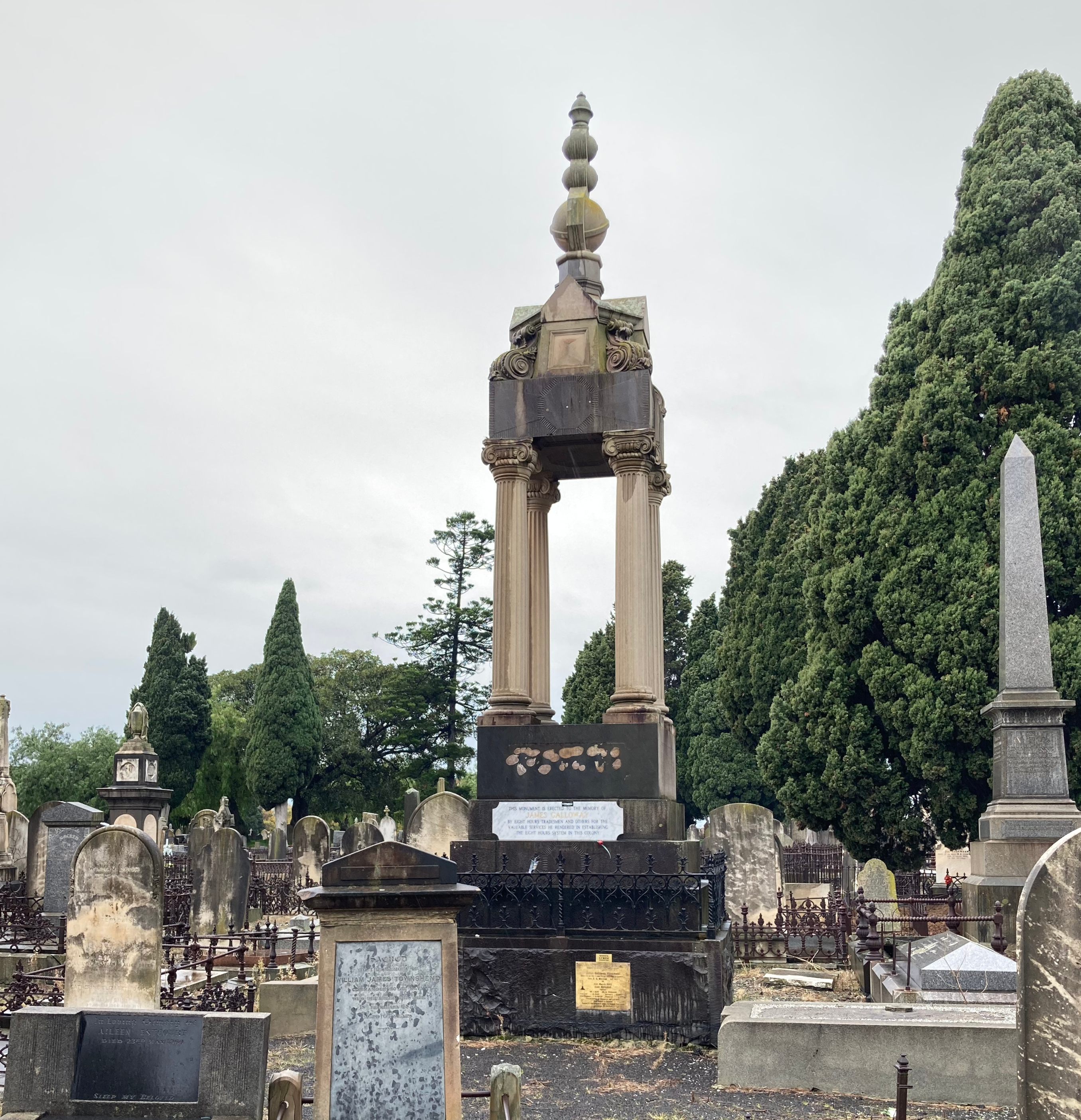
Galloway's grave at Melbourne General Cemetery

While initially both Stephens and Galloway were acknowledged as the instigators of the movement, Stephens fell into disfavour among his union colleagues for advocating subcontracting. Galloway became ill and destitute, and died in Collingwood, Victoria, in 1860, aged 32. He was buried at Melbourne General Cemetery. In 1869 the unions raised funds to provide a monument at Galloway's grave, at which it was said that Galloway had initiated the eight hours movement. Stephens sought to restore his own reputation, and later the roles of Galloway and Stephens were both acknowledged by historians.
