= Jim Galloway (soccer) =

Canadian soccer player and manager

Personal information
- Full name: James Galloway
- Position: Forward

Senior career*
| Years | Team | Apps | (Gls) |
| 1925 | Toronto Scottish | | |
| 1925–1926 | Boston | 26 | (7) |
| 1927–1932 | Toronto Ulster United FC | | |
| 1935–1936 | Kodak Park | | |

International career
| 1925–1926 | Canada | 2 | (0) |

Managerial career
- 1939–1940: England United
- * Club domestic league appearances and goals

Jim Galloway was a Canadian soccer player who played as a forward at the international level with Canada.

== Club career ==
Galloway played in the Inter-City League in 1925 with Toronto Scottish. He shortly joined Boston Soccer Club to play in the American Soccer League. In 1927, he played in the National Soccer League with Toronto Ulster United FC. Throughout his tenure with Toronto he would secure the Ontario Cup in 1927, and 1929. In 1932, he participated in the NSL Championship final where Toronto defeated Montréal Carsteel FC for the title.

In 1935, he played in the Rochester Inter-City League with Kodak Park.

== International career ==
Galloway made his debut for the Canada men's national soccer team on 27 June 1925 against United States in a friendly match.

== Managerial career ==
In 1939, Galloway was the head coach for England United in the National Soccer League, and secured the Ontario Cup in 1940.
