= James Galloway (footballer) =

Scottish footballer

Personal information
- Full name: James Blyth Galloway
- Date of birth: 3 July 1893
- Place of birth: Buckhaven, Scotland
- Date of death: 17 November 1918 (aged 25)
- Place of death: Kasauli, British India
- Position: Centre forward

Senior career*
Years	Team	Apps	(Gls)
–1913	Haywood Juniors		
1913–1918	Third Lanark	7	(1)
- * Club domestic league appearances and goals

James Blyth Galloway (3 July 1893 – 17 November 1918) was a Scottish professional footballer who played in the Scottish League for Third Lanark as a centre forward.

== Personal life ==
Galloway worked as an architect. A territorial, he was called up for service when the First World War broke out in August 1914 and joined the Royal Field Artillery. After a long period on the Western Front, he was commissioned as a second lieutenant on 16 September 1917. Galloway was posted to India late in the war and died of pneumonia in Kasauli on 17 November 1918, just six days after the end of the war. He was buried in Kasauli Cemetery.

== Career statistics ==
Appearances and goals by club, season and competition
Club	Season	League			Scottish Cup		Total	
Club	Season	Division	Apps	Goals	Apps	Goals	Apps	Goals
Third Lanark	1913–14	Scottish First Division	6	1	0	0	6	1
Third Lanark	1917–18	Scottish First Division	1	0	—		1	0
Career total			7	1	0	0	7	1
