= Eight-hour day movement =

Social movement to regulate the length of the working day

8-hour workday political posters.

The eight-hour day movement (also known as the 40-hour week movement or the short-time movement) was a social movement that appeared in various countries to regulate the length of a working day. The goal was preventing excesses and abuses of working time.

The modern movement originated in the Industrial Revolution in Britain, where industrial production in large factories transformed working life. At that time, the working day could range from 10 to 16 hours, the work week was typically six days, and child labour was common. Since the 19th century, the eight-hour workday has been gradually adopted in various countries and industries, with widespread adoption occurring in the first half of the 20th century.

== History ==
=== Sixteenth century ===
In 1593, Philip II of Spain established an eight-hour work day for the construction workers in the American Viceroyalties by a royal edict known as Ordinances of Philip II (Spanish: Ordenanzas de Felipe II). This established:

Título sexto. De las fábricas y fortificaciones.

Ley VI Que los obreros trabajen 8 horas al día repartidas como convenga.

Todos los obreros trabajaran ocho horas al día, cuatro á la mañana, y cuatro á la tarde en fortificaciones y fábricas, que se hicieren, repartidas á los tiempos más convenientes para librarse del rigor del sol, más o menos lo que á los ingenieros pareciere, de forma que no faltando un punto de lo posible, también se atienda á procurar su salud y conservación.

Sixth title. From factories and fortifications.

Law VI That the workers work eight hours a day distributed as convenient.

All the workers will work eight hours a day, four in the morning, and four in the afternoon in fortifications and factories, distributed at the most convenient times to avoid the harsh sun, more or less as the engineers see fit, so that, without failing in any way, their health and safety are also taken care of.

An exception was applied to mine workers, whose work day was limited to seven hours. These working conditions were also applied to natives in the Spanish America, who also kept their own legislation organised in "Indian republics" where they elected their own mayors.

=== Industrial Revolution ===
In the early 19th century, Robert Owen raised the demand for a ten-hour day in 1810, and instituted it in his "socialist" enterprise at New Lanark. By 1817, he had formulated the goal of the eight-hour day and coined the slogan: "Eight hours' labour, Eight hours' recreation, Eight hours' rest". Women and children in England were granted the ten-hour day via the Factories Act 1847. French workers won the twelve-hour day after the February Revolution of 1848.

A shorter working day and improved working conditions were part of the general protests and agitation for Chartist reforms and the early organisation of trade unions. There were initial successes in achieving an eight-hour day in New Zealand and by the Australian labour movement for skilled workers in the 1840s and 1850s, though most employed people had to wait to the early and mid twentieth century for the condition to be widely achieved through the industrialised world through legislative action.

The International Workingmen's Association took up the demand for an eight-hour day at its Congress in Geneva in 1866, declaring "The legal limitation of the working day is a preliminary condition without which all further attempts at improvements and emancipation of the working class must prove abortive", and "The Congress proposes eight hours as the legal limit of the working day." Karl Marx saw it as of vital importance to the workers' health, writing in Das Kapital (1867): "By extending the working day, therefore, capitalist production...not only produces a deterioration of human labour power by robbing it of its normal moral and physical conditions of development and activity, but also produces the premature exhaustion and death of this labour power itself."

==== Red triangle badge ====
The red triangle has been a left-wing political symbol since the 19th century. On Labor Day in 1890 in France workers wore a red triangle as a symbol of the eight-hour working day they were fighting for, with the three points representing 8 hours of work, 8 hours of rest, and 8 hours of leisure. It is still used with this meaning in some parts of Europe, in conjunction with Labour Day celebrations on 8 May. In July 1889 in Paris, at the meeting of the Second International, the workers' association bringing together European socialist and workers' parties, decided that the following year, workers would demonstrate on May 1 to demand the eight-hour day. The red leather triangle was adopted on 1 May 1890 in Paris during the workers' struggles so that the demonstrator could distinguish himself from the man in the street. The badge symbolizes workers' demand for a maximum eight-hour work day, which reserved 8 hours of sleep and 8 hours of leisure. The inscription "1 May, 8 hours of work" was sewn onto the triangle for the demonstration. Following the immense success of the mobilization of the 1 May 1890 – in Belgium, 150,000 workers went on strike – it was decided shortly afterward to make this date a worldwide day of action, this is the creation of the International Workers' Day (French: Journée internationale des travailleurs). The eight-hour day was obtained in 1919 in France and in 1921 in Belgium.

Advertisements for 'Three 8' brand soap (Note: 'Three 8' referred to 8 hours of work, 8 hours of leisure, and 8 hours of sleep.)

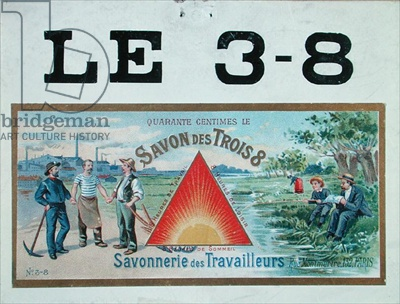
'3x8' brand soap

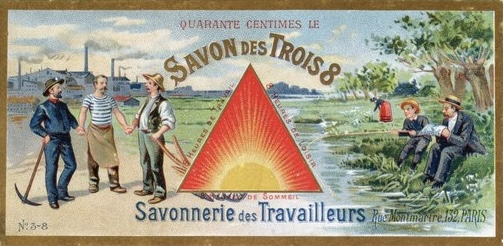
French: Savon des Trois 8, lit. 'Soap of the Three 8'

=== World War I and Labour Reforms ===
Prior to World War I, efforts to reduce working hours, particularly to establish an 8-hour workday, progressed slowly and unevenly across various nations. With the onset of the war in 1914, belligerent countries suspended restrictions on working hours in industries critical to the war effort, prioritizing production over labour standards. However, the intense demand for munitions revealed that extending working hours did not yield proportional increases in output. Conversely, shorter working hours were found to enhance worker efficiency stemming from the improved health of the worker and his increased production capacity for invested efforts.

In 1915 Uruguay became a pioneer in labour legislation by adopting the 8-hour workday, formalised by (law) Ley N° 5.350

Another consequence of World War I, the Russian Revolution of 1917, significantly influenced global labour policies. The Bolsheviks’ radical rhetoric and labour reforms, including the 8-hour workday, inspired socialist and communist movements worldwide. In 1918–1919, revolutions erupted in Germany, Hungary, and Finland, while strikes and labour unrest surged in Britain, France, and the United States. Western leaders, employers, and trade unionists feared that without addressing workers’ grievances, a "global proletarian revolution" could destabilise capitalist democracies.

Thus, better understanding of labour efficiency, fear of revolutionary movements and liberal aspirations of the nations drove efforts to improve working conditions. International cooperation in this direction resulted in the Versailles Treaty's labour provisions, signed in 1919, which included creation of the International Labour Office, later renamed to the International Labour Organization (ILO).

The eight-hour day was the first topic discussed by the International Labour Organization which resulted in the Hours of Work (Industry) Convention, 1919 ratified by 52 countries as of 2016. The eight-hour day movement forms part of the early history for the celebration of May Day, and Labour Day in some countries.

== Asia ==
=== India ===
Tata Steel was among the first Indian companies to provide various labour welfare benefits, such as eight-hour workdays since 1912, free medical care since 1915, school facilities for the children of employees since 1917, paid time off since 1920, formation of a provident fund and accident compensation in 1920, vocational training since 1921, maternity benefits since 1928, profit sharing bonuses since 1934, and retiring gratuity since 1937.

=== Iran ===
In Iran in 1918, the work of reorganizing the trade unions began in earnest in Tehran during the closure of the Iranian constitutional parliament Majles. The printers' union, established in 1906 by Mohammad Parvaneh as the first trade union, in the Koucheki print shop on Nasserieh Avenue in Tehran, reorganised their union under leadership of Russian-educated Seyed Mohammad Dehgan, a newspaper editor and an avowed Communist. In 1918, the newly organised union staged a 14-day strike and succeeded in reaching a collective agreement with employers to institute the eight-hours day, overtime pay, and medical care. The success of the printers' union encouraged other trades to organise. In 1919 the bakers and textile-shop clerks formed their own trade unions.

However the eight-hour day only became code by a limited governor's decree on 1923 by the governor of Kerman, Sistan, and Balochistan, which controlled the working conditions and working hours for workers of carpet workshops in the province. In 1946, the council of ministers issued the first labour law for Iran, which recognised the eight-hour day.

=== Israel ===
Theodor Herzl's The Jewish State proposed a 7-hour day for the Jewish Company that would implement the initial stages of the Jewish homeland.

=== Japan ===
The first company to introduce an eight-hour working day in Japan was the Kawasaki Dockyards (now the Kawasaki Shipbuilding Corporation) in Kobe. An eight-hour day was one of the demands presented by the workers during pay negotiations in September 1919. After the company resisted the demands, a slowdown campaign was commenced by the workers on 18 September. After ten days of industrial action, company president Kōjirō Matsukata agreed to the eight-hour day and wage increases on 27 September, which became effective from October. The effects of the action were felt nationwide and inspired further industrial action at the Kawasaki and Mitsubishi shipyards in 1921.

The eight-hour day did not become law in Japan until the passing of the Labour Standards Act in April 1947. Article 32 (1) of the Act specifies a 40-hour week and paragraph (2) specifies an eight-hour day, excluding rest periods.

=== Indonesia ===
In Indonesia, the first policy regarding working time regulated in Law No. 13 of 2003 about employment. In the law, it stated that a worker should work for seven hours a day for six days a week or eight hours a day for five days a week, excluding rest periods.

=== China ===
In China, the first company to introduce the eight-hour working day was the Baocheng Cotton Mill in the port city of Tianjin (Chinese: 天津市寶成紗廠). Its manager Wu Jingyi (Chinese: 吳鏡儀) announced on 16 February 1930 through Ta Kung Pao that his factory is starting the new 8-hour work schedule immediately. The workers were elated. The union representative Liu Dongjiang (Chinese: 劉東江) stated "Under the spirit of cooperation, labourers and factory owners work together to advance the business, and in turn to contribute to our nation's development." A celebration was held on the same day in the courtyard of the factory.

The new schedule was called "3–8 schedule". The first shift worked 6 am – 2 pm; the 2nd shift 2 pm – 10 pm; the 3rd shift 10 pm – 6 am. Manager Wu Jingyi reasoned: "All of the factories now have a 12-hour work schedule. Workers are all exhausted and do not have time to take care of their families. In case of workers getting sick, the business also suffers. Therefore we decided to start trying the eight-hour working day".

The Beiyang government in Beijing had issued a decree "Provisional Regulations for factories" as early as in 1923, stating "Child-labourers shall not work more than 8 hours per day and shall have 3 days of rest per week; while adult labourers shall not work more than 10 hours per day and shall have 2 days of rest per week." After the successful Northern Expedition, the new Nanking government established the Bureau of Labour in 1928, followed by issuing the "Factory Law" in 1929 to set legal framework for the eight-hour working day. Yet, no business actually implemented this until 1930 by Baocheng Cotton Mill.

== Central America ==
=== Guatemala ===
In Guatemala, the 8-hour workday was first established in 1947, during the Guatemalan Revolution, when Congress passed an act to add a Labour Code to the Constitution of Guatemala. It included Article 116, which mandated an 8-hour workday and 48-hour work week. However, some workers—including plantation workers and domestic workers—were exempted from the requirements in Article 116 and were still required to work long hours.

Additional labour protections and restrictions on working hours were added to the Constitution later, notably in 1985 and 1993. As of April 2025, the standard workday in Guatemala is 8 hours per day, and anything beyond that is legally considered overtime (with mandated overtime pay at a rate of at least 125% of the regular rate). A person can work a maximum of 12 hours per day, including regular hours and overtime, and the maximum hours worked per week is 44 (or lower, if at least some of those working hours take place at night). Domestic workers are still exempt from the normal working hour requirements, and it is common for them to work 12 to 14 hours per day, six-and-a-half days per week.

In practice, many Guatemalans work longer hours than are currently allowed for their type of work. Enforcement of regulations around working hours is limited, especially in the agricultural sector, where many work beyond the legal limits and are paid less than the legal minimum wage. Additionally, workers of all types sometimes choose to work more than the maximum number of hours per week because their wages are too low for them to provide for themselves and their families without working additional hours, or because there are no jobs available that will provide work within legal limits.

== Europe ==
Demonstration in the Netherlands for the eight-hour day, 1924

=== Belgium ===
The eight-hour work day was introduced in Belgium on 9 September 1921. There are strict limits on overtime in Belgium, and few jobs are exceptions to the limit of 40 hours per week.

=== Denmark ===
The eight-hour work day was introduced by law in Denmark on 17 May 1919, after a year-long campaign by workers.

=== Czechoslovakia ===
As a result of large-scale demonstrations and strikes in the late 19th and early 20th century, the former Czechoslovakia (now Czechia and Slovakia) introduced the eight-hour workday on 19 December 1918.

=== Finland ===
The eight-hour work day was established in Finland in 1917 as a result of the November general strike. According to the law accepted in late 1917, maximum work day was 8 hours and maximum work week 47 hours. Five-day work week was established gradually between 1966 and 1970. A worker receives 150% payment from the first two extra hours, and 200% salary if the work day exceeds 10 hours.

=== France ===
The eight-hour day was enacted in France by Georges Clemenceau, as a way to avoid unemployment and diminish communist support. It was succeeded by a strong French support of it during the writing of the International Labour Organization Convention of 1919.

=== Germany ===
The first German company to introduce the eight-hour day was Degussa in 1884. The eight-hour day for industrial workers was signed into law during the German Revolution of 1918 by the new Social Democratic government. The eight-hour day was a concession to the workers' and soldiers' soviets, and was unpopular among industrialists. A 12-hour day was reintroduced by a right-wing government during the occupation of the Ruhr and subsequent hyperinflation crisis in 1923. The Labour Ministry eventually shortened wages in the late 1920s.

=== Hungary ===
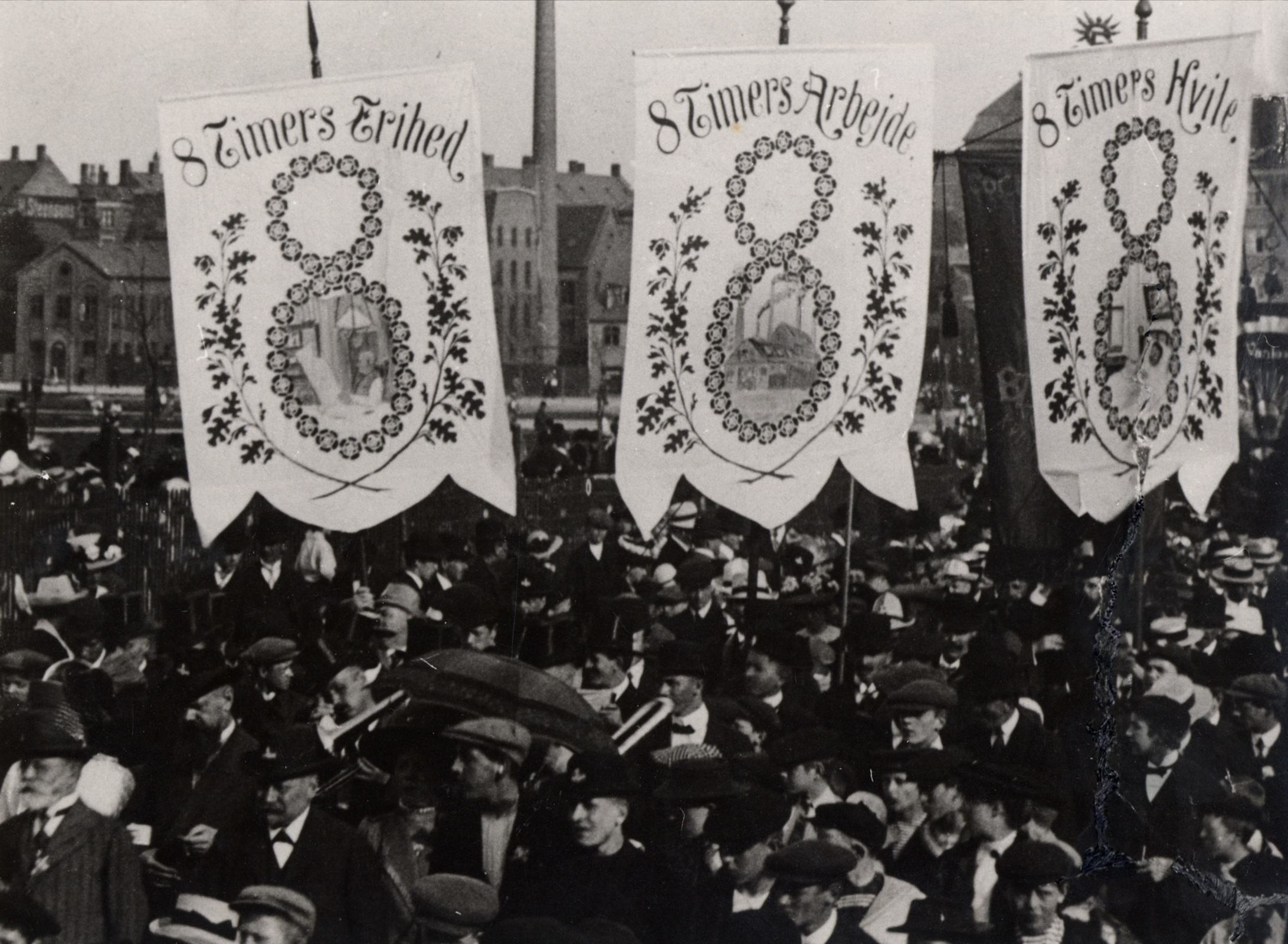
Eight-hour campaign in Denmark, 1912

In Hungary, the eight-hour work day was introduced on 14 April 1919 by decree of the Revolutionary Governing Council.

=== Italy ===
The eight-hour work day became legal in Italy on 17 April 1925 after a law passed 15 March 1923 that authorised the king to set a limit on daily work hours, and a royal decree issued on 10 September 1923. The law set a maximum limit of work at eight hours per day, albeit for six days a week for a 48-hour work week. On 13 January 1938, the length of the work week was reduced to 40 hours.

=== Norway ===
The Factory Act of 1915 introduced a 10-hour workday in Norway. Currently the standard workday according to the law is 9 hours long, but the standard work week is limited to 40 hours, so people commonly work 8 hours per day, 5 days per week.

=== Poland ===
In Poland, the eight-hour day was introduced 23 November 1918 by decree of the cabinet of the Prime Minister Jędrzej Moraczewski.

=== Portugal ===
In Portugal, during the First Portuguese Republic, a vast wave of strikes occurred in 1919, supported by the National Workers' Union, the biggest labour union organisation at the time. The workers achieved important objectives, including the historic victory of an eight-hour work day.

=== Soviet Union ===
In the Soviet Union, the eight-hour day was introduced four days after the October Revolution, by a Decree of the Soviet government in 1917. It was further reduced to seven-hour day in 1928, increased till seven-hour and eight-hour day during 1940–1956 (during the World War II and the following phase of recovery), and eventually settled into a standard 40-hour workweek by 1991.

=== Spain ===
In the region of Alcoy, a workers' strike in 1873 for the eight-hour day followed much agitation from the anarchists. In 1919 in Barcelona, after a 44-day general strike with over 100,000 participants had effectively crippled the Catalan economy, the Government settled the strike by granting the striking workers' demands that included an eight-hour day, union recognition, and the rehiring of fired workers. Therefore, Spain became on 3 April 1919 the first country in the world to introduce a universal law effective on all type of works, restricting the workday to a maximum of eight hours: "Real decreto de 3 de abril de 1919", signed by the Prime Minister, Álvaro de Figueroa, 1st Count of Romanones.

=== Sweden ===
The average number of work hours per week for manufacturing employees in Sweden was 64 hours in 1885, 60 hours in 1905, and 55 hours in 1919.

The eight-hour work day was introduced into law in Sweden on 4 August 1919, going into effect on 1 January 1920. At the time, the work week was 48 hours, since Saturday was a workday. The year before, 1918, the builders' union had pushed through a 51-hour work week.

The Social Democratic Party was the main driver behind the eight-hour workday. Once full male suffrage was implemented in Sweden, the parliament passed legislation to introduce an eight-hour workday.

=== United Kingdom ===
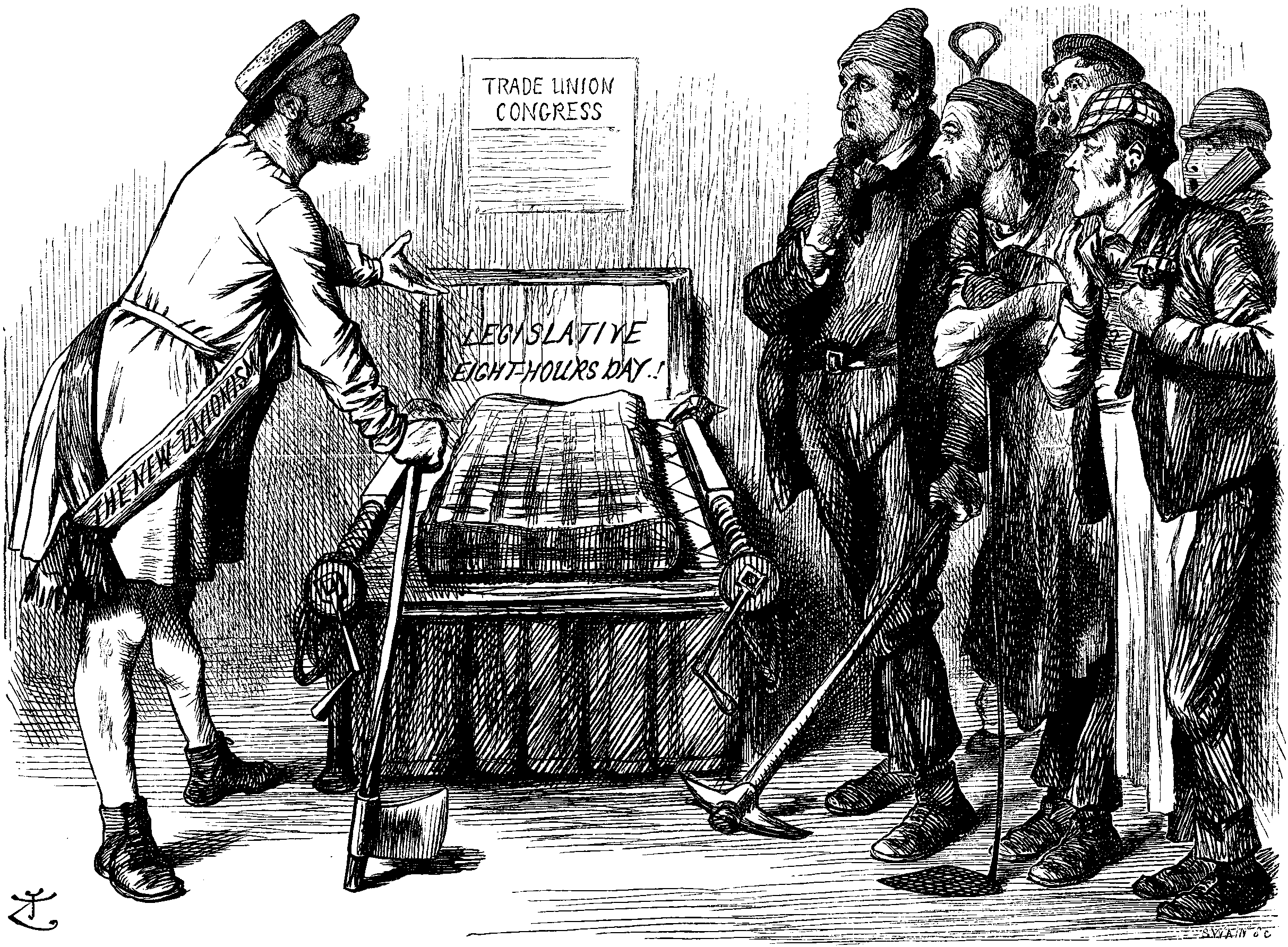
The Modern Bed of Procrustes Procrustes. "Now then, you fellows; I mean to fit you all to my little bed!" Chorus. "Oh lor-r!!" "It is impossible to establish universal uniformity of hours without inflicting very serious injury to workers." – Motion at the recent Trades' Congress. Cartoon from Punch, Vol 101, 19 September 1891

The Factory Act 1833 limited the work day for children in factories. Those aged 9–13 could work only eight hours, and those aged 14–18 twelve hours. Children under 9 were required to attend school.

In 1884, Tom Mann joined the Social Democratic Federation (SDF) and published a pamphlet calling for the working day to be limited to eight hours. Mann formed an organisation, the Eight Hour League, which successfully pressured the Trades Union Congress to adopt the eight-hour day as a key goal. The British Fabian socialist economist Sidney Webb and the scholar Harold Cox co-wrote a book supporting the "Eight Hours Movement" in Britain.

The first group of workers to achieve the 8-hour day were the Beckton, East London gas workers after the strike under the leadership of Will Thorne, a member of the Social Democratic Federation. The strike action was initiated on 31 March 1889 after the introduction of compulsory 18-hour shifts, up from the previous 12 hours. Under the slogan of "shorten our hours to prolong our lives" the strike spread to other gas works. He petitioned the bosses and after a strike of some weeks, the bosses capitulated and three shifts of eight hours replaced two shifts of 12 hours. Will Thorne founded the Gas Workers and General Labourers Union, which evolved into the modern GMB union.

Working hours in the UK are currently not limited by day, but by week, as first set by the Working Time Regulations 1998, which introduced a limit of 40 hours per week for workers under 18, and 48 hours per week for over 18s. This was in line with the European Commission Working Time Directive of 1993. UK regulations now follow the EC Working Time Directive of 2003, but workers can voluntarily opt out of the 48-hour limit. A general eight-hour limit to the working day has never been achieved in the UK. By the end of the 20th century, many people considered themselves to be "money-rich, time-poor".

== North America ==
=== Canada ===
The labour movement in Canada tracked progress in the US and UK. In 1890, the Federation of Labour took up this issue, hoping to organise participation in May Day. Ontario adopted legislation in 1944, limiting the work day to 8 hours. In the 1960s, Canada adopted the 40-hour work week.

=== Mexico ===
The Mexican Revolution of 1910–1920 produced the Constitution of 1917, which contained Article 123 that gave workers the right to organise labour unions and to strike. It also provided protection for women and children, the eight-hour day, and a living wage.

=== United States ===
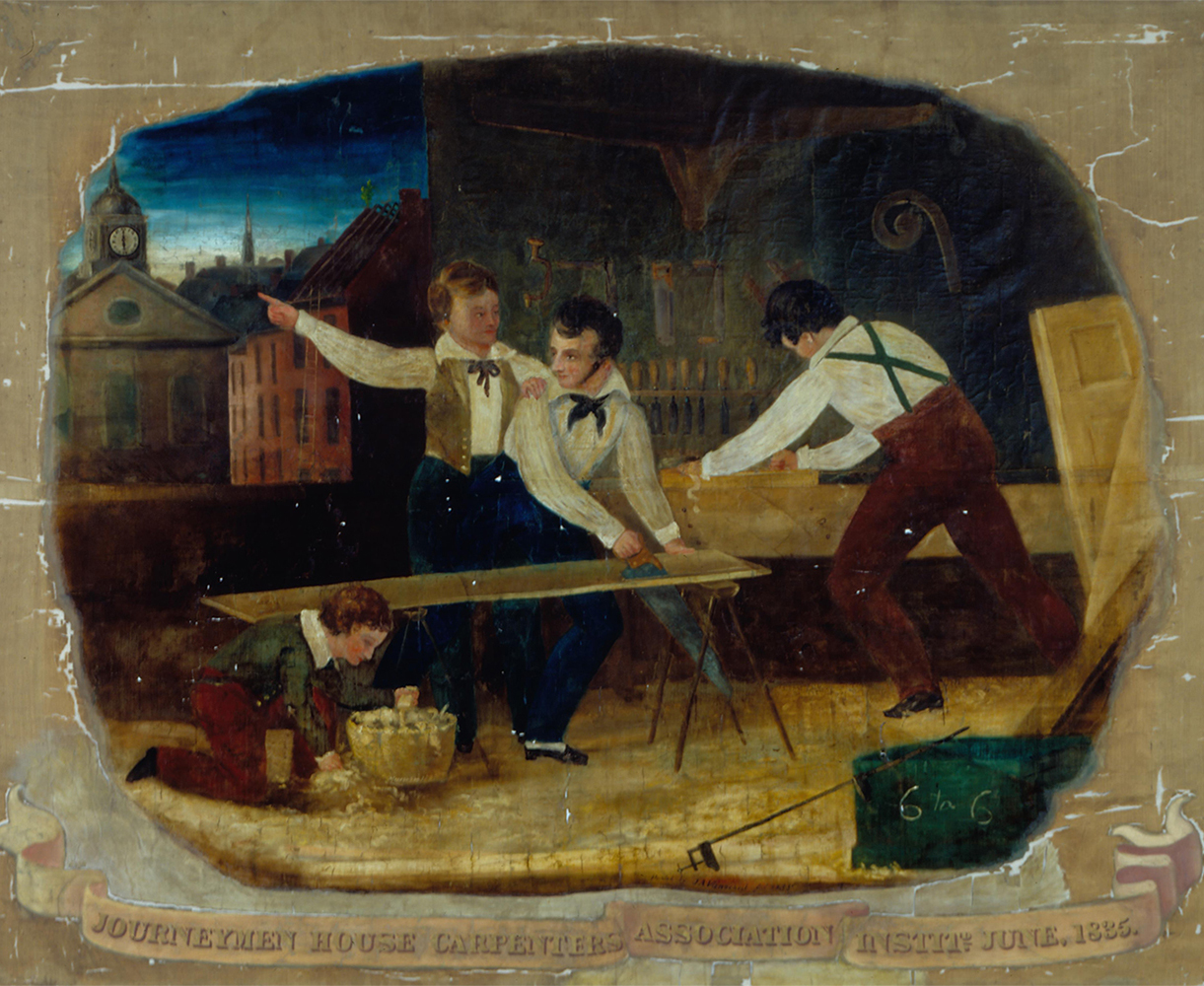
Banner from the 1835 Philadelphia general strike promoting the ten-hour workday. In the lower right-hand corner is written the slogan 6 to 6. Also the worker points to the clock which shows six, indicating it is time to stop working.

In the United States, Philadelphia carpenters went on strike in 1791 for the ten-hour day. By the 1830s, this had become a general demand. In 1835, workers in Philadelphia organised the 1835 Philadelphia general strike, the first general strike in North America, led by Irish coal heavers. Their banners read, From 6 to 6, ten hours work and two hours for meals. Boston ship carpenters, although not unionised, achieved an eight-hour day in 1842.

By the early 1860s, eight-hour days had been become a prominent demand of labor movements.

In 1864, the eight-hour day quickly became a central demand of the Chicago labour movement. The Illinois General Assembly passed a law in early 1867 granting an eight-hour day, but it had so many loopholes that it was largely ineffective. A citywide strike that began on 1 May 1867 shut down the city's economy for a week before collapsing.

In August 1866, the National Labor Union at Baltimore passed a resolution that said, "The first and great necessity of the present to free labor of this country from capitalist slavery, is the passing of a law by which eight hours shall be the normal working day in all States of the American Union. We are resolved to put forth all our strength until this glorious result is achieved."

On 25 June 1868, Congress passed an eight-hour law for federal employees which was also of limited effectiveness. It established an eight-hour workday for labourers and mechanics employed by the Federal Government. President Andrew Johnson had vetoed the act but it was passed over his veto. Johnson told a Workingmen's Party delegation that he could not directly commit himself to an eight-hour day, but nevertheless he told the same delegation that he greatly favoured the "shortest number of hours consistent with the interests of all." According to Richard F. Selcer, however, the intentions behind the law were "immediately frustrated" as wages were cut by 20%.

On 19 May 1869, President Ulysses S. Grant issued a Proclamation directing that the wages of federal government "laborers, workmen, and mechanics" paid by the day could not be cut when their workday was reduced to 8 hours under the 1868 law.

During the 1870s, eight hours became a central demand, especially among labour organisers, with a network of Eight-Hour Leagues which held rallies and parades. A hundred thousand New York City workers struck for the eight-hour day in 1872, mostly for building trades workers. In Chicago, Albert Parsons became recording secretary of the Chicago Eight-Hour League in 1878, and was appointed a member of a national eight-hour committee in 1880.

At its convention in Chicago in 1884, the Federation of Organized Trades and Labor Unions resolved that "eight hours shall constitute a legal day's labour from and after May 1, 1886, and that we recommend to labour organizations throughout this jurisdiction that they so direct their laws as to conform to this resolution by the time named."

The leadership of the Knights of Labor, under Terence V. Powderly, rejected appeals to join the movement as a whole, but many local Knights assemblies joined the strike call including Chicago, Cincinnati and Milwaukee. On 1 May 1886 Albert Parsons, head of the Chicago Knights of Labor, led 80,000 people down Michigan Avenue in Chicago in what is regarded as the first modern May Day Parade, with the cry, "Eight-hour day with no cut in pay." In the next few days they were joined nationwide by 350,000 workers who went on strike at 1,200 factories, including 70,000 in Chicago, 45,000 in New York, 32,000 in Cincinnati, and additional thousands in other cities. Some workers gained shorter hours (eight or nine) with no reduction in pay; others accepted pay cuts with the reduction in hours.

The American Federation of Labor, meeting in St. Louis in December 1888, set 1 May 1890 as the day that American workers should work no more than eight hours. The International Workingmen's Association (Second International), meeting in Paris in 1889, endorsed the date for international demonstrations, thus starting the international tradition of May Day.

The United Mine Workers won an eight-hour day in 1898.

The Building Trades Council (BTC) of San Francisco, under the leadership of P. H. McCarthy, won the eight-hour day in 1900 when the BTC unilaterally declared that its members would work only eight hours a day for US$3 a day (equivalent to $120 in 2025). When the mill resisted, the BTC began organising mill workers; the employers responded by locking out 8,000 employees throughout the Bay Area. The BTC, in return, established a union planing mill from which construction employers could obtain supplies – or face boycotts and sympathy strikes if they did not. The mill owners went to arbitration, where the union won the eight-hour day, a closed shop for all skilled workers, and an arbitration panel to resolve future disputes. In return, the union agreed to refuse to work with material produced by non-union planing mills or those that paid less than the Bay Area employers.

By 1905, the eight-hour day was widespread in the printing trades – see International Typographical Union § Fight for better working conditions – but the majority of Americans worked 12- to 14-hour days.

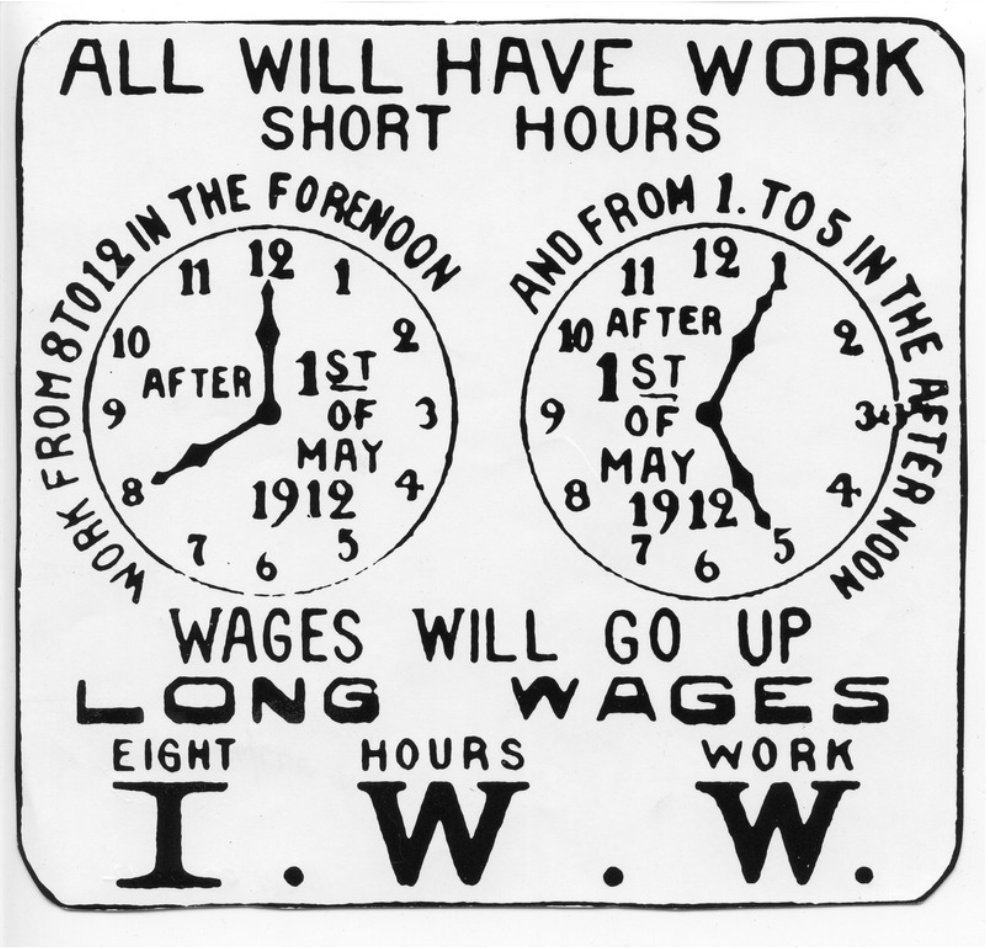
Poster promoting the Industrial Workers of the World (IWW) campaign for the eight-hour workday, 1912

In the 1912 Presidential Election Teddy Roosevelt's Progressive Party campaign platform included the eight-hour work day.

On 5 January 1914 the Ford Motor Company took the radical step of doubling pay to $5 a day (equivalent to $160 in 2025) and cutting shifts from nine hours to eight, moves that were not popular with rival companies, although seeing the increase in Ford's productivity, and a significant increase in profit margin (from $30 million to $60 million in two years), most soon followed suit.

In the summer of 1915, amid increased labour demand for World War I, a series of strikes demanding the eight-hour day began in Bridgeport, Connecticut. They were so successful that they spread throughout the Northeast.

The United States Adamson Act in 1916 established an eight-hour day, with additional pay for overtime, for railroad workers. This was the first federal law that regulated the hours of workers in private companies. The United States Supreme Court upheld the constitutionality of the Act in Wilson v. New, 243 U.S. 332 (1917).

The eight-hour day might have been realised for many working people in the US in 1937, when what became the Fair Labor Standards Act (29 U.S. Code Chapter 8) was first proposed under the New Deal. As enacted, the act applied to industries whose combined employment represented about twenty percent of the US labour force. In those industries, it set the maximum workweek at 40 hours, but provided that employees working beyond 40 hours a week would receive additional overtime bonus salaries.

==== Puerto Rico ====
In Puerto Rico in May 1899, while under US administration, General George W. Davis acceded to demands from Puerto Ricans and decreed freedom of assembly, speech, press, religion and an eight-hour day for government employees.

== Oceania ==
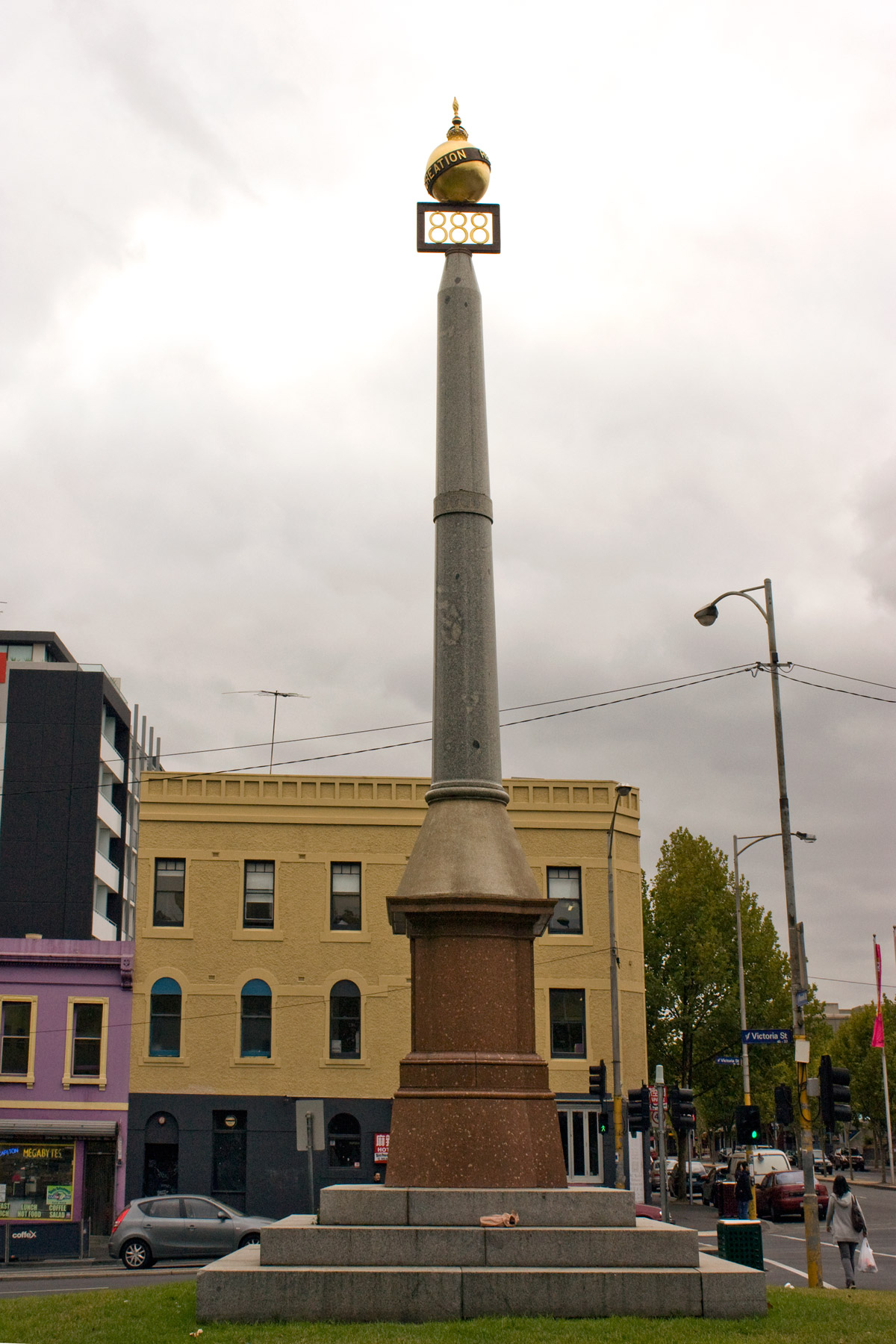
Eight Hour Monument by Percival Ball on the corner diagonally opposite Victorian Trades Hall at the corner of Russell and Victoria Streets

=== Australia ===
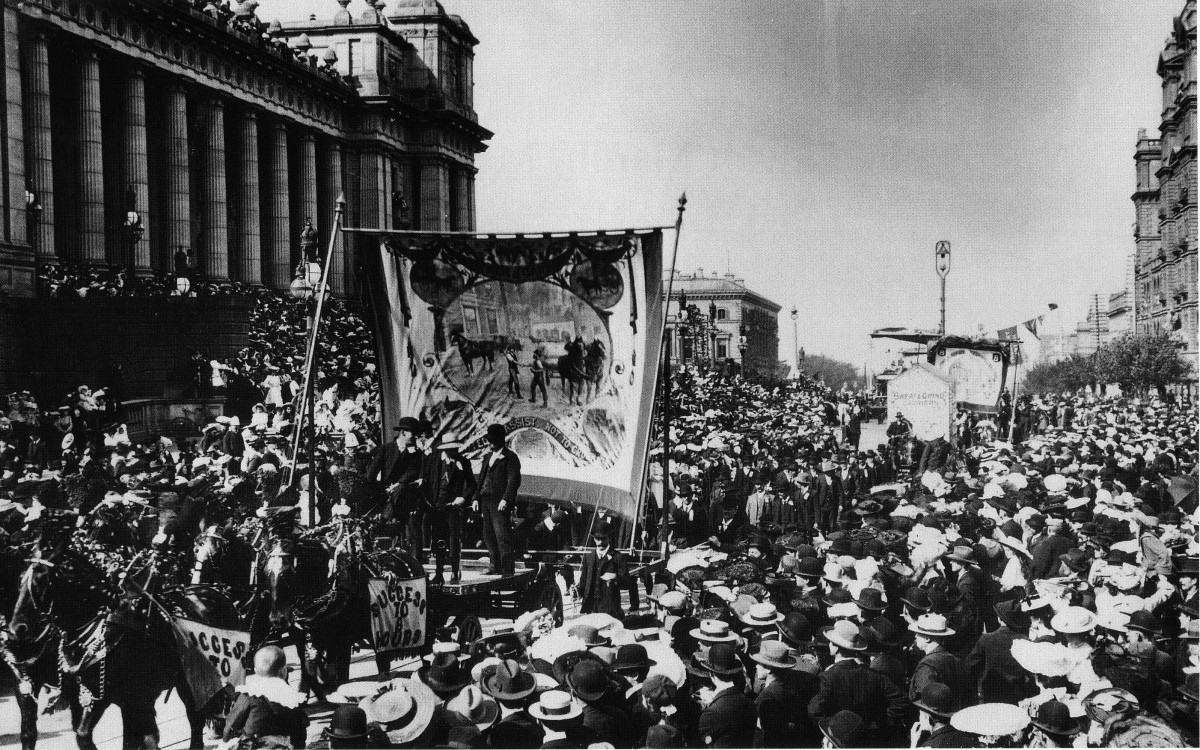
Eight-hour day march c. 1900, outside Parliament House in Spring Street, Melbourne

The Australian gold rushes attracted many skilled tradesmen to Australia. Some of them had been active in the Chartist movement in Britain, and subsequently became prominent in the campaign for better working conditions in the Australian colonies. Workers began winning an eight-hour day in various companies and industries in the 1850s.

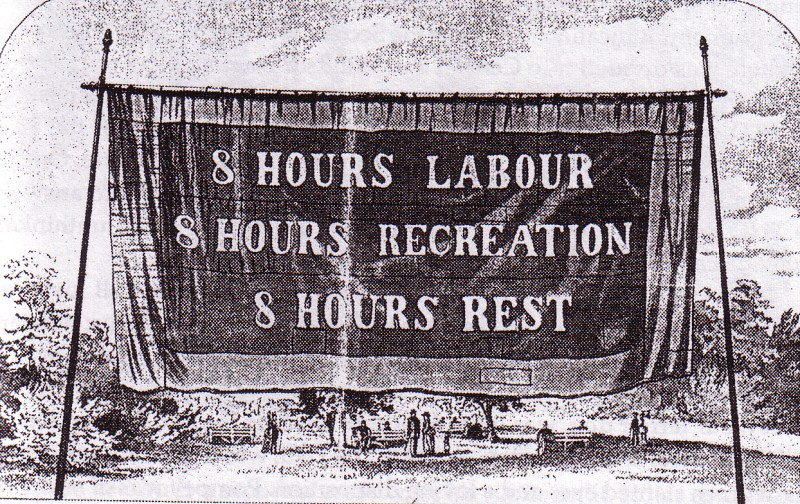
Eight-hour day banner, Melbourne, 1856

The Stonemasons' Society in Sydney issued an ultimatum to employers on 18 August 1855 saying that after six months masons would work only an eight-hour day. Due to the rapid increase in population caused by the gold rushes, many buildings were being constructed, so skilled labour was scarce. Stonemasons working on the Holy Trinity Church and the Mariners' Church (an evangelical mission to seafarers), decided not to wait and pre-emptively went on strike, thus winning the eight-hour day. They celebrated with a victory dinner on 1 October 1855 which to this day is celebrated as a Labour Day holiday in the state of New South Wales. When the six-month ultimatum expired in February 1856, stonemasons generally agitated for a reduction of hours. Although opposed by employers, a two-week strike on the construction of Tooth's Brewery on Parramatta Road proved effective, and stonemasons won an eight-hour day by early March 1856, but with a reduction in wages to match.

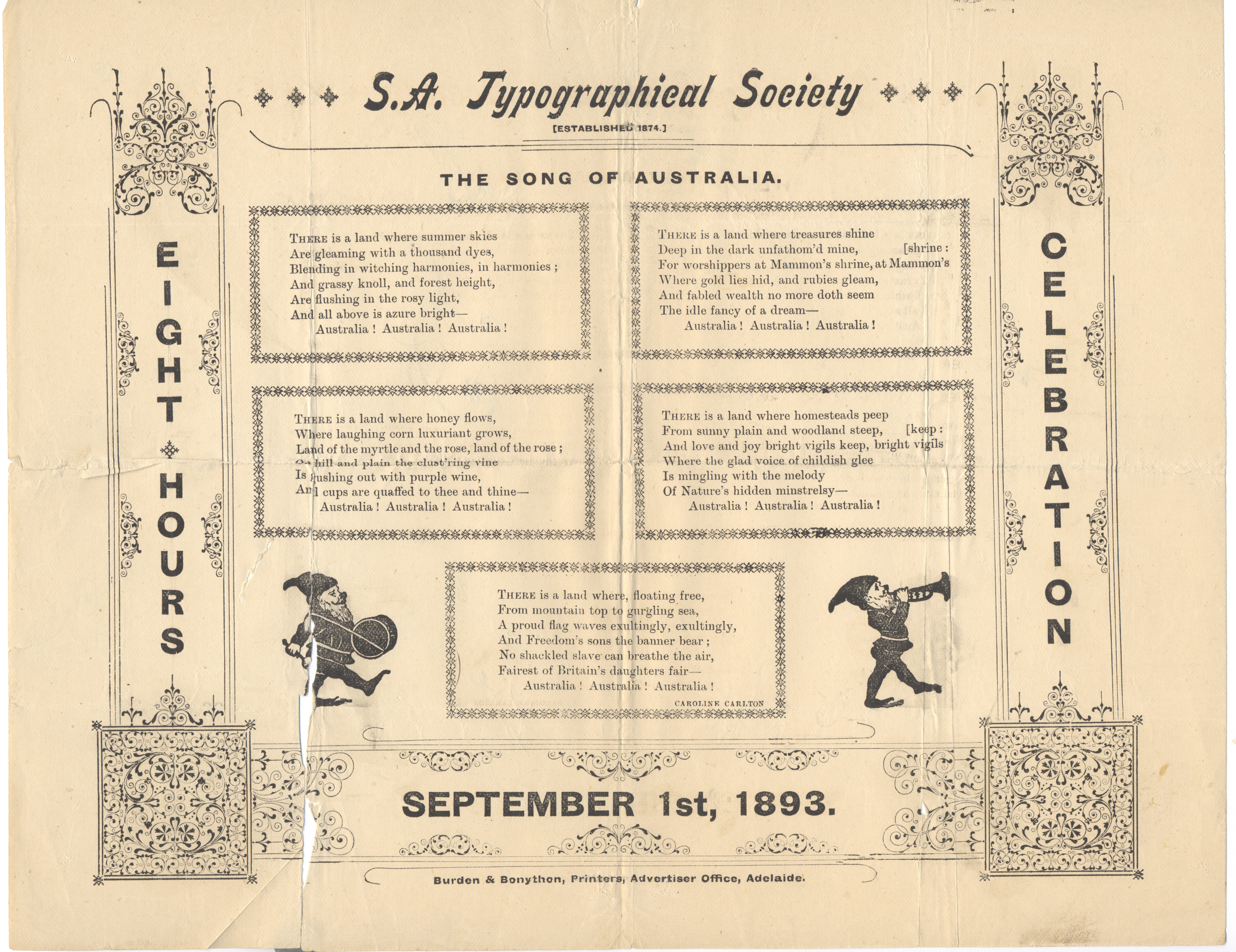
S.A. Typographical Society Ephemera Eight Hours Celebration Caroline Carleton The Australia Song September 1st 1893

Agitation was also occurring in Melbourne where the craft unions were more militant. Stonemasons working on Melbourne University organised to down tools on 21 April 1856 and march to Parliament House with other members of the building trade. The movement in Melbourne was led by veteran Chartists, and masons James Stephens, T.W. Vine and James Galloway. The government agreed that workers employed on public works should enjoy an eight-hour day with no loss of pay and stonemasons celebrated with a holiday and procession on Monday 12 May 1856, when about 700 people marched with 19 trades involved. By 1858, the eight-hour day was firmly established in the building industry and by 1860, the eight-hour day was fairly widely worked in Victoria. From 1879, the eight-hour day was a public holiday in Victoria. The initial success in Melbourne led to the decision to organise a movement, to actively spread the eight-hour idea, and secure the condition generally.

In 1903, veteran socialist Tom Mann spoke to a crowd of a thousand people at the unveiling of the Eight Hour Day monument, funded by public subscription, on the south side of Parliament House on Spring St. It was relocated in 1923 to the corner of Victoria and Russell Streets outside Melbourne Trades Hall.

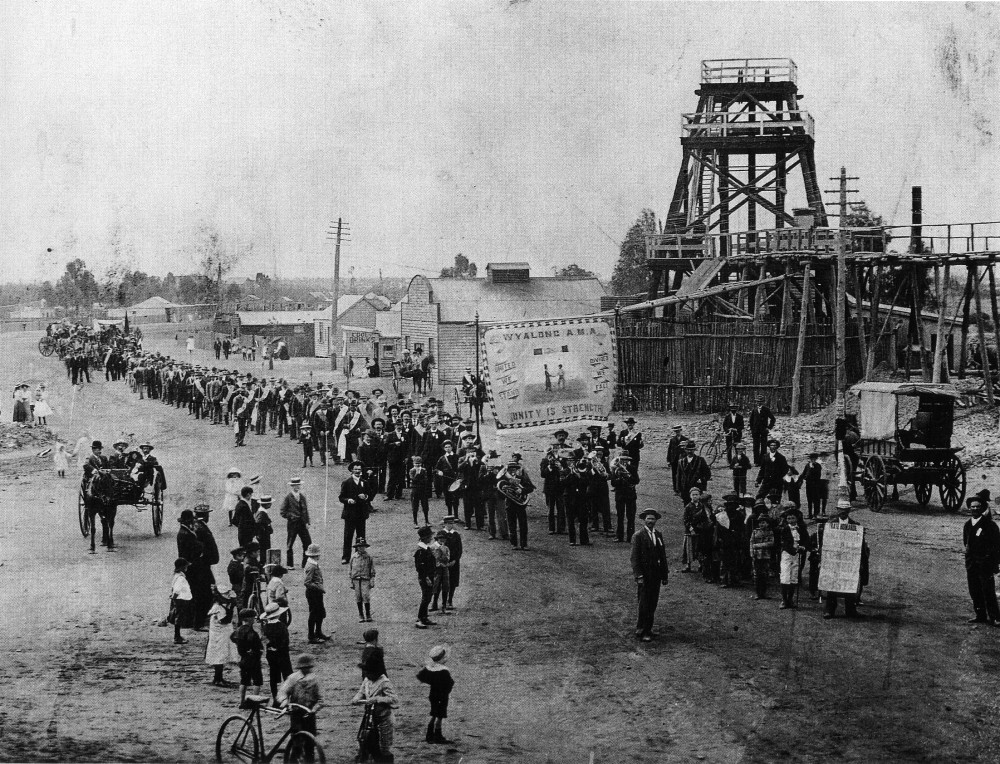
Eight-hour day procession by miners in Wyalong, New South Wales – late 1890s

It took further campaigning and struggles by trade unions to extend the reduction in hours to all workers in Australia. In 1916 the Victoria Eight Hours Act was passed granting the eight-hour day to all workers in the state. The eight-hour day was not achieved nationally until the 1920s. The Commonwealth Arbitration Court gave approval of the 40-hour five-day working week nationally beginning on 1 January 1948. The achievement of the eight-hour day has been described by historian Rowan Cahill as "one of the great successes of the Australian working class during the nineteenth century, demonstrating to Australian workers that it was possible to successfully organise, mobilise, agitate, and exercise significant control over working conditions and quality of life. The Australian trade union movement grew out of eight-hour campaigning and the movement that developed to promote the principle."

The intertwined numbers 888 soon adorned the pediment of many union buildings around Australia. The Eight Hour March, which began on 21 April 1856, continued each year until 1951 in Melbourne, when the conservative Victorian Trades Hall Council decided to forgo the tradition for the Moomba festival on the Labour Day weekend. In capital cities and towns across Australia, Eight Hour day marches became a regular social event each year, with early marches often restricted to those workers who had won an eight-hour day.

=== New Zealand ===
Promoted by carpenter Samuel Duncan Parnell as early as 1840, when he refused to work more than eight hours a day when erecting a store for merchant George Hunter. He successfully negotiated this working condition and campaigned for its extension in the infant Wellington community. A meeting of Wellington carpenters in October 1840 pledged "to maintain the eight-hour working day, and that anyone offending should be ducked into the harbour".

Parnell is reported to have said: "There are twenty-four hours per day given us; eight of these should be for work, eight for sleep, and the remaining eight for recreation and in which for men to do what little things they want for themselves." With tradesmen in short supply the employer was forced to accept Parnell's terms. Parnell later wrote, "the first strike for eight hours a day the world has ever seen, was settled on the spot".

Emigrants to the new settlement of Dunedin, Otago, while on board ship decided on a reduction of working hours. When the resident agent of the New Zealand Company, Captain Cargill, attempted to enforce a ten-hour day in January 1849 in Dunedin, he was unable to overcome the resistance of trades people under the leadership of house painter and plumber, Samuel Shaw. Building trades in Auckland achieved the eight-hour day on 1 September 1857 after agitation led by Chartist painter, William Griffin. For many years the eight-hour day was confined to craft tradesmen and unionised workers. Labour Day, which commemorates the introduction of the eight-hour day, became a national public holiday in 1899.

== South America ==
A strike for the eight-hour day was held in May 1919 in Peru. In Uruguay, the eight-hour day was introduced in 1916 during the presidency of Feliciano Viera. It was introduced in Chile on 8 September 1924 at the demand of then-general Luis Altamirano as part of the Ruido de sables that culminated in the September Junta.

== See also ==
- 996 working hour system
- Effects of overtime
- Flextime
- Four-day workweek
- Haymarket riot
- Occupational burnout
- Occupational stress
- Overwork
- Reduction of hours of work
- Right to rest and leisure
- Right to work
- Work–life interface
