= Liceu bombing =

1893 anarchist bombing in Spain

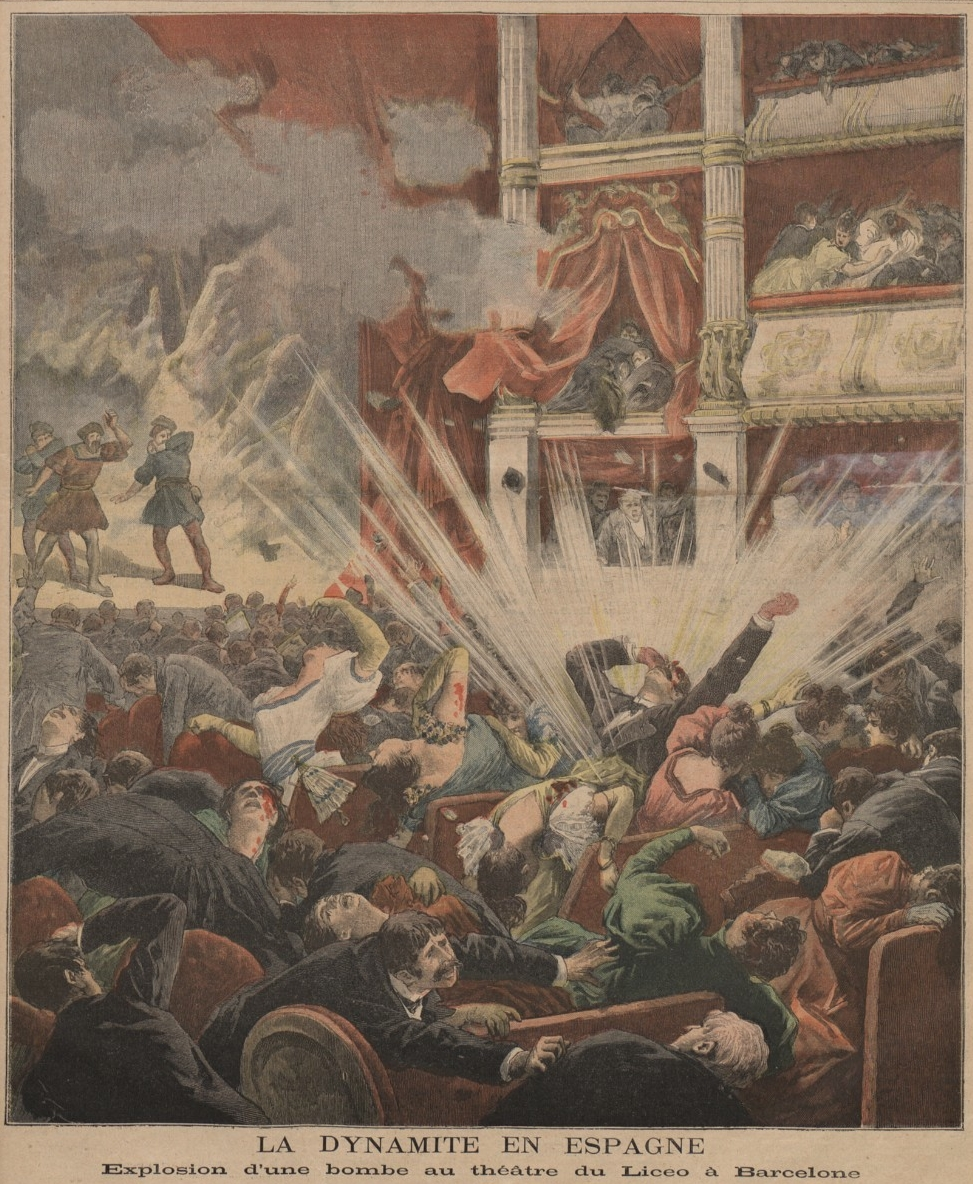
- Illustration of the bombing in Le Petit Journal
- Location: 41°22′49″N 2°10′24″E; Gran Teatre del Liceu, La Rambla, 51–59; Barcelona, Catalonia, Spain
- Date: 7 November 1893
- Target: Catalan bourgeoisie
- Attack type: Indiscriminate bombing
- Weapon: Orsini bomb
- Deaths: 20-30
- Injuries: 27-35
- Perpetrator: Santiago Salvador
- No. of participants: 1
- Motive: Revenge for the execution of Paulí Pallàs
- Convicted: 11
- Judge: Enrique Marzo

The Liceu bombing was a terrorist attack by the Spanish anarchist Santiago Salvador, who killed 20 to 30 people at Barcelona's Gran Teatre del Liceu (Grand Lyceum Theatre) on 7 November 1893. The bombing was in response to the execution of Paulí Pallàs, who had himself attempted to assassinate the Captain General of Catalonia, Arsenio Martínez Campos.

The attack quickly caused a reaction from the right-wing press, which engaged in the dehumanisation of anarchists, calling for their constitutional rights to be revoked and the repression of the anarchist movement by a new secret police. Valeriano Weyler was appointed as Captain General of Catalonia and initiated a crackdown against the anarchist movement. The police arrested 415 people, both known and suspected anarchists, over the subsequent months. The military tribunal disregarded Salvador's confession of sole responsibility, convinced that a conspiracy existed.

Several anarchists were tortured into giving forced confessions, leading to the execution of six people and the life imprisonment of four others. After spending the last months of his life feigning a conversion to Catholicism, which helped him avoid torture and receive more public support, Salvador was executed by garrote. Despite the introduction of anti-anarchist legislation by the Congress of Deputies, the 1896 Barcelona Corpus Christi procession bombing took place two years later. Many of those arrested in the aftermath of the Liceu bombing were arrested again during the Montjuïc trials.

At the time, the Liceu bombing was one of the deadliest terrorist attacks in world history, causing a higher death toll than the previous three decades of terrorist attacks. It has been categorised as an indiscriminate attack and contrasted with most other acts of anarchist terrorism, which largely focused on targeted assassinations of state officials and symbolic acts of property damage.

== Background ==
In 1858, the Italian nationalist revolutionary Felice Orsini invented a new type of improvised explosive device, the self-titled Orsini bomb. It was a rectangular-shaped bomb, which ranged between various different sizes and weighed roughly 1.5 kg. The bombs were detonated after colliding with a solid object, which would push its protruding "nipples" back into the bomb's core, filled with mercury fulminate and black powder, and cause an explosion. Orsini and his collaborators used the bomb to carry out an assassination attempt against French Emperor Napoleon III, while he was on his way to see Gioachino Rossini's William Tell. The Orsini bomb would be used by terrorists for decades after the attempt against Napoleon.

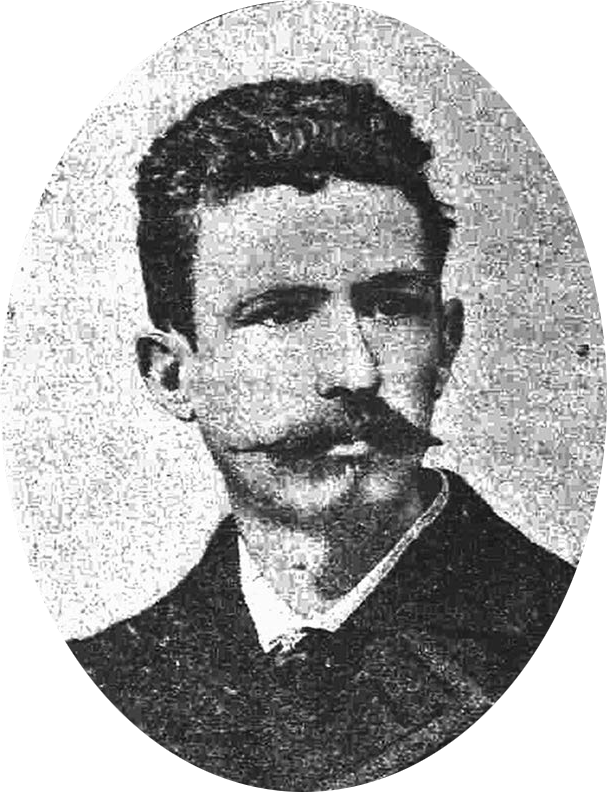
Paulí Pallàs, the Catalan anarchist who attempted to assassinate the Captain General of Catalonia Arsenio Martínez Campos

Following the emergence of an organised anarchist movement in the late 19th century, a minority of anarchists began to advocate for revolutionary terrorism as a way to combat state terrorism. These insurrectionary anarchists were opposed by the anarcho-syndicalists, who focused on trade union organising. Some revolutionary anarchists sympathised with certain violent acts on a case-by-case basis, depending on the methods and target of the attack. The latter case was illustrated by the Russian anarchist philosopher Peter Kropotkin, who in 1880 expressed his support for propaganda of the deed, which he considered to be a valid method of instigating revolution. By 1891, he had changed his opinion, arguing that capitalism and the state could not be destroyed by bombing attacks, although he still privately sympathised with individual attackers.

The 1890s were characterised by anarchist terrorism. Between 1886 and 1900, fifty bombing attacks took place in Spain. During this period, terrorists switched from using dynamite to Orsini bombs, which became the new favourite weapon of anarchists. Until 1893, few of the bombings that took place actually caused deaths or any significant damage. On 24 September 1893, the Catalan anarchist Paulí Pallàs attempted to assassinate Arsenio Martínez Campos, the Captain General of Catalonia. He threw two Orsini bombs at Martínez's military procession as it passed through Gran Via, where they exploded, killing one person and wounding 16 others; his target was only slightly injured. Pallàs was arrested and imprisoned in the Drassanes barracks and later tried by a military tribunal at Montjuïc Castle, where he was sentenced to execution by firing squad. The trial and execution were closely followed by the anarchist Santiago Salvador, who decided to avenge Pallàs' death by carrying out his own terrorist attack.

== Attack ==
=== The opera night ===
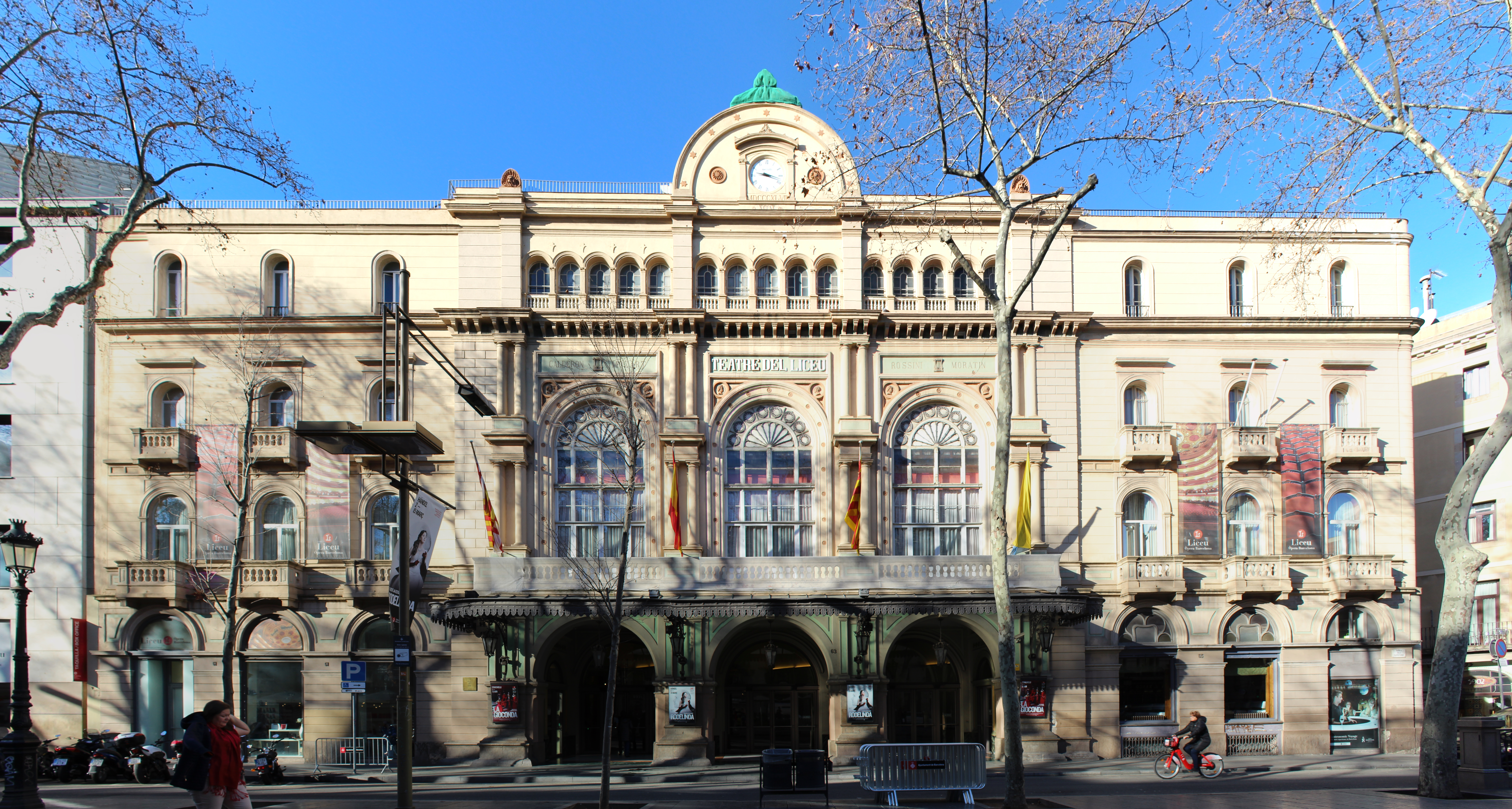
Façade of the Liceu Theatre, on La Rambla

The month after the execution of Pallàs, bourgeois society in Barcelona began to return to a sense of normality, with the winter opening of the Great Lyceum Theatre (Catalan: Gran Teatre del Liceu) being welcomed as a distraction from public fears of bombing attacks. The Liceu, rebuilt in 1862, was at the centre of high society in Barcelona. The theatre was attached to a private members' club, the Cercle del Liceu, where wealthy patrons could dine before the evening play. On 7 November 1893, the theatre was nearly filled to its 3,600 person capacity. Attendees included the wife and daughters of Arsenio Martínez Campos. Its opening production was of Rossini's Guglielmo Tell, an opera extolling the virtues of freedom and tyrannicide. That evening, Santiago Salvador left his house with two Orsini bombs. With a peseta that his wife had given him to buy salt, he bought a ticket for one of the cheap seats on the fifth floor.

=== Bombing ===
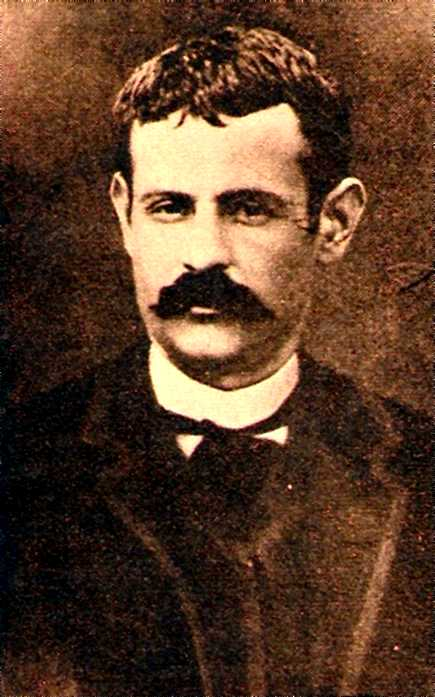
Santiago Salvador, the perpetrator of the Liceu bombing

During the second act of the opera, Salvador threw the two bombs from the fifth-story balcony into the crowd below. One of the bombs exploded on impact, hitting rows 13 and 14, where a number of people were killed immediately. It also destroyed seats and discharged shrapnel, which wounded spectators in the upper rows. The other failed to detonate, as its fall had been broken by a woman it landed on. The explosion filled the theatre with dark grey smoke. Some members of the audience initially assumed it was a part of the show and applauded the act, before realising what had happened. The singers and the orchestra froze and panic swept the audience, who trampled over each other as they rushed to escape the theatre. As the wounded people's cries of pain began to be heard over the mass of noise, the production's singers also pushed their way out onto the street in full costume. Salvador made use of the confusion to escape undetected.

By the time the authorities arrived, many had already died. Many of the wounded were treated on-site by doctors who had been in the audience. Stretchers were brought for the wounded from the military hospital at the Drassanes barracks, allowing them to be rushed to the nearby Hospital de la Santa Creu. Meanwhile, priests hurried to administer last rites to the dying. Journalists took note of the details of every corpse, describing what they were wearing and the fatal wounds they had suffered. As news of the bombing spread, friends and family of the attendees rushed to theatre trying to find them.

In the immediate aftermath, the police began arresting anyone suspicious who they could find, including an Italian marble worker and French baker who they had previously detained under suspicion of bombing attacks. A local jeweler who had survived the attack returned to find that someone had taken advantage of the police's distraction to rob his nearby jewelry store; the thief was never apprehended. The attacker Santiago Salvador stood by and watched the panicked crowd of police, survivors and passers-by. After observing how frightened he had made the Catalan bourgeoisie, he withdrew from the crowd and fled into the night. The following day, Salvador casually walked around the city. When he met up with some of his anarchist comrades, he bragged to them about his attack. When they tried to get him to leave, he responded that they lacked character and courage while he himself had sacrificed his own life "in the benefit of human progress". As he returned home that evening, all the city's theatres had closed in mourning. He told his wife what he had done, causing her to break down in tears. He personally remained proud of his attack and eagerly read the newspapers' accounts of the bombing, delighting in the panic his attack had stirred among the bourgeois press.

=== Casualties ===
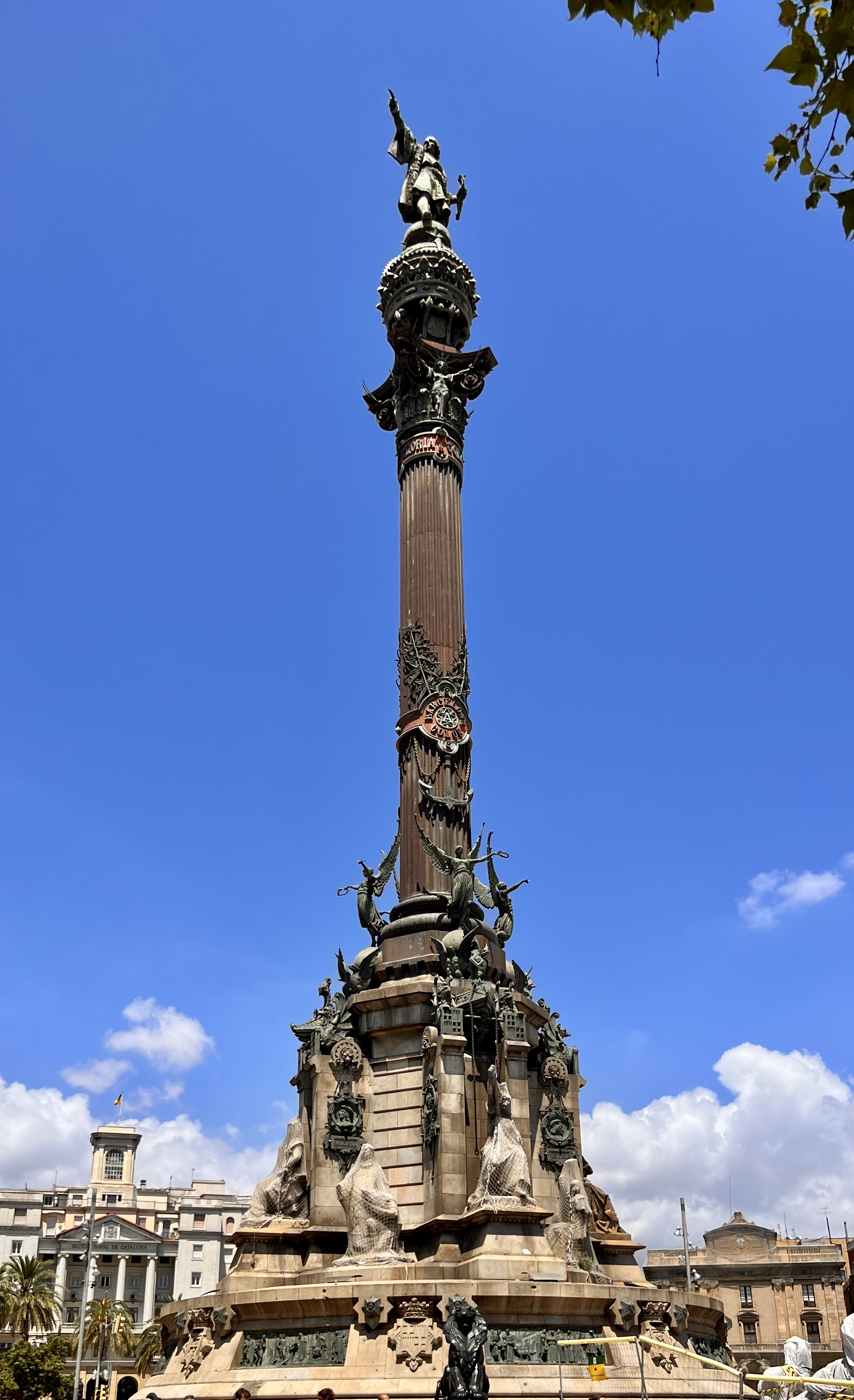
The Columbus Monument, where the funeral procession of the victims of the bombing ended

An accurate count of the victims has been difficult to ascertain, as the Spanish government provided no official death toll and imposed a gag order on press coverage of the bombing. According to the court case files, 20 people were confirmed to have been killed and 27 more were wounded. Among the dead was a 14-year-old girl, and nine women. Historian Julián Casanova gave 22 as the number of people killed. In The Battle Against Anarchist Terrorism, Richard Bach Jensen estimated that as many as 30 people had been killed: according to historian George Esenwein, the bombing initially killed 15 people and wounded 50; by December 1893, The Times and The New York Times reported that 15 more people had died from their wounds. This would have left 35 people among the wounded survivors. The highest estimate of the death toll was provided by a 1901 article published in The Catholic World, which claimed that the bombing had instantly killed 15 people and mortally wounded 40 more.

At the time, the Liceu bombing was one of the deadliest terrorist attacks in the history of the anarchist movement. The bombing killed more people in a single attack than the total number of deaths caused in the previous three decades of terrorist attacks, including all those caused by anarchist terrorism since the 1880s. It also killed twice as many people as had died as a result of French anarchist terrorism during the whole 1890s.

Two days after the bombing, a mass funeral for those killed in the bombing was held, with their caskets being taken out in heavy rain on a procession from the Hospital de la Santa Creu. At the head of the procession were mounted police of the Municipal Guard, followed by children holding candles and priests reciting mourning rites. Passing many mourners along the way, the procession made its way down La Rambla, where streetlights decorated with black ornaments and black sheets hung from balconies. Hearses carrying the dead, covered in flowers, moved slowly down the street. They were followed by members of Barcelona's high society, including Martínez Campos himself. As the procession approached the Columbus Monument, the police grew nervous that it would become a target for another anarchist attack. Santiago Salvador had asked his comrades for more bombs so that he could attack the procession, but they refused to give him any. He instead joined the procession at the Columbus Monument, where he saw all of the local authorities gathered together; he lamented that he had missed a "magnificent occasion to throw more bombs".

== Press reaction ==
The Catalan newspaper La Vanguardia described the unknown perpetrator as an inhuman monster, driven by "instincts of a hyena [and] the hatreds of a savage", who had set human civilization back by centuries. The Republican paper Diario Mercantil argued that the perpetrator, assumed to have been an anarchist, displayed an "instinctive cruelty" by targeting innocent people. Due to the makeup of the Liceu audience, which consisted of people from different social classes, as well as the cross-class reaction against the bombing, the press initially neglected to consider the motive of class conflict. At this point in time, an indiscriminate attack against a large crowd was unprecedented. El País pointed to how other terrorist attacks by Irish nationalists, Russian nihilists and anarchists had specific high-profile targets; no terrorist had yet considered it permissible to kill random people in advancement of their political cause. One newspaper, La Correspondencia de España, described the Liceu bombing as having ushered in an unprecedented "lottery of death".

Anarchists were dehumanised by the right-wing press, which portrayed them as unnaturally malignant entities who were waging war against human civilisation. La Vanguardia compared the anarchist movement to "tigers roam[ing] free in the heart of society"; La Dinastía rejected that the attack had an analogue in nature, as animals only attack when provoked, while the "dynamiter" actively sought to commit violence. Although the bombs used by Salvador were close replicas of the design of an Orsini bomb, the Spanish press often erroneously referred to it as dynamite. One paper described the bombing as a "dynamite outrage", while another hoped the attack, as well as a recent accidental dynamite explosion on a ship in Santander, would draw the authorities' attention to dynamite. A French anarchist periodical also described the bomb as dynamite, while claiming that the attack had been motivated by the "fatal excesses of the bourgeoisie".

La Dinastía began to blame the rise of the anarchist movement on liberalism and democratic ideals, including freedom of speech and freedom of association. The paper claimed that these civil liberties provided anarchists protection, which allowed them free space to conspire to destroy civilization. It called for the revocation of civil liberties from anarchists, comparing them to the people in Spain's African colonies, who likewise had civil liberties denied to them under the justification of preventing violence. In response to attacks on civil liberties by the right-wing press, the republican newspaper El País argued that the bombing had proven the monarchy to be incapable of maintaining social order and posited that such acts of terrorism would not have taken place in a republic.

The right-wing press then began to propose the enactment of anti-anarchist legislation and, if that failed, extralegal paramilitary violence against the anarchist movement. La Dinastía argued that these proposals were part of a struggle for existence against anarchists, which to them justified wielding the law against the anarchist movement. They claimed that anarchists were not human, that they did not deserve rights and instead ought to be "exterminated" like "wild beasts". A letter to La Correspondencia de España invoked the example of lynching in the United States and called for the extrajudicial murder of anarchists, who they believed threatened women and children. Another letter to La Dinastía called for the wealthy Spaniards to fund the creation of a secret police, which could carry out the political repression of the anarchist movement. The proposal was endorsed by the paper, as well as the Barcelona employers' association and other papers such as the Diario de Barcelona and La Publicidad. Only the republican newspaper El Diluvio rejected these proposals, fearing the spread of political repression to other opposition groups.

Meanwhile, in the United States, Joseph Pulitzer's sensationalist newspaper The Evening World was the first to report the news of the bombing to an American audience. In its edition on the bombing, the front of the newspaper reported that an anarchist had thrown two bombs into the crowd, killing 18 people in the explosion and causing a stampede of nearly 4,000 people, who trampled others under foot. Its report on the story, combined with its coverage of the 1893 New York state election, made its 8 November 1893 issue the highest-selling newspaper issue in American history.

== Prosecution ==
=== Political reforms ===
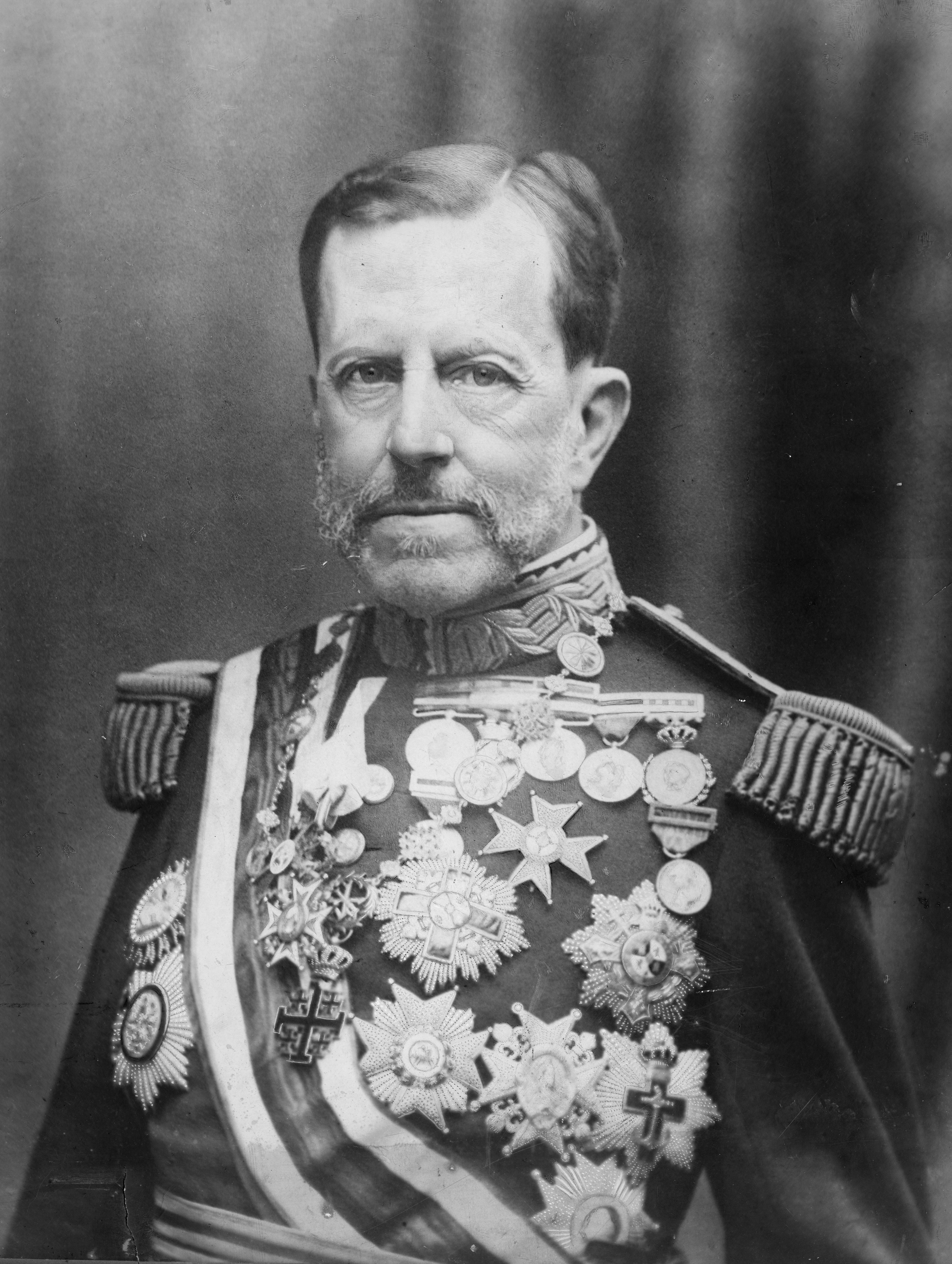
Valeriano Weyler, the Captain General of Catalonia in 1894

At the time of the Liceu bombing, the police force in Barcelona was numerically weak, with less than 200 officers to police over 400,000 citizens. A French commissioner in Barcelona reported that the anarchist movement was not being monitored enough, despite its size and influence. The Barcelona police were understaffed, poorly paid and badly managed, while the politics of the Turno had resulted in cronyism, as new governing parties routinely replaced their predecessors' police chiefs with their own. Police officers were also largely uneducated, with many who failed competency exams or were even illiterate. The clientelism network between the police, civil governors and the government resulted in many police officers being paid for no work.

Seeking to change this system and appease the upper classes, Arsenio Martínez Campos contacted Interior Minister Joaquín López Puigcerver and War Minister José López Domínguez, with whom he discussed how to respond to the threat of further anarchist terrorism. López Domínguez proposed that the government declare a state of war in Catalonia, arrest the suspects and bring them before a military tribunal. Martínez Campos pushed back against this, believing a declaration of war would become a European scandal, and insisted on the maintenance of the jurisdiction of civil law. He instead proposed that the Congress of Deputies pass legislation to suspend constitutional rights for anarchists and bring the anarchist movement under the jurisdiction of military tribunals, allowing them to prosecute terrorism, incitement and the possession of explosives.

In late November 1893, general Valeriano Weyler was recalled from the Philippines and appointed as the new Captain General of Catalonia. Weyler specialised in counterinsurgency, having fought in the Dominican Restoration War, the Ten Years' War, the Third Carlist War and the Filipino insurgency. The government hoped he would be able to suppress the anarchist movement. The following month, the government reformed the Catalan police and judiciary, creating lists of suspected anarchists in every province and instructing judges to issue stronger sentences to anarchists. The Civil Governor of Barcelona Ramón Larroca created a register of foreign residents in the province, began deporting foreign anarchists and collaborated with French border guards to stop anarchists from crossing the France–Spain border. However, when the Spanish government requested the deportation of nine anarchists to France, the French government only accepted the three who were French nationals, rejecting the six Italians. The Spanish government then stopped asking their French counterparts and instead covertly smuggled anarchists back over the border into France.

In late 1893, the Spanish government attempted to form an alliance with other European states to coordinate an international political repression of the anarchist movement. They received support from Austria-Hungary and Portugal, but the proposed accord was rejected by France and the United Kingdom. The British government was not concerned about anarchist terrorism, as the UK lacked a substantial anarchist movement. It also distrusted the authoritarian implications of the proposal. with Foreign Secretary Archibald Primrose pointing out that it could lead to continent-wide political repression if the accord did not draw a clear line between anarchism and other schools of opinion.

=== Arrests ===
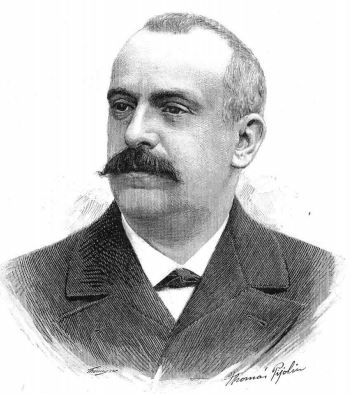
Josep Collaso, the Mayor of Barcelona, who established a secret police force to carry out political repression against the anarchist movement in 1894

In the days after the bombing, Barcelona was in panic. Police arrested dozens of known anarchists, suspecting them of possible involvement. The Queen regent Maria Christina declared a state of emergency and suspended constitutional rights in Catalonia. The suspension of constitutional rights allowed the police to carry out arbitrary arrests against the anarchist movement. In the first two months after the bombing, as many as 260 people were arrested. In early 1894, Mayor of Barcelona Josep Collaso attempted to establish a secret police force to repress the anarchist movement. Led by officers of the Civil Guard, it was ordered to carry out a mass arrest of known and suspected anarchists. The Jesuits and concerned parents' associations subsequently began reporting "indecency" to the police.

By March 1894, police had carried out 415 arrests. Hundreds of prisoners filled up the cells of Montjuïc Castle, the Drassanes barracks and the Reina Amalia prison in El Raval, leading to some prisoners being housed on a ship in the port of Barcelona. Among the arrested were: Josep Llunas, the editor of the collectivist anarchist newspaper La Tramontana, who vehemently opposed terrorism; the anarchist feminist Teresa Claramunt; and Lluis Más, who was on the editorial staff of La Nueva Idea. Rumours about an anarchist conspiracy quickly spread through the Spanish press, which named Josep Codina as the leader of the conspiracy. The police soon arrested Codina and his suspected accomplice Manuel Cerezuela. Roughly 100 anarchists were detained in Montjuïc. Some of the prisoners died due to the conditions of their imprisonment, while some others, including Martí Borràs, committed suicide there.

As evidence began to build in Barcelona that Salvador was the man responsible for the bombing, the Civil Guard initiated efforts to track him down. In early 1894, the Civil Guard raided Salvador's cousin's apartment, located near the Cathedral of the Savior of Zaragoza. There they found Salvador in bed with a hangover. During the arrest, the Guards prevented him from drinking a flask full of poison and shot him in the hip. As no further terrorist acts occurred over the subsequent months, funding for the secret police force was reduced, leading to its dissolution by the spring of 1894.

=== Trials and sentencing ===
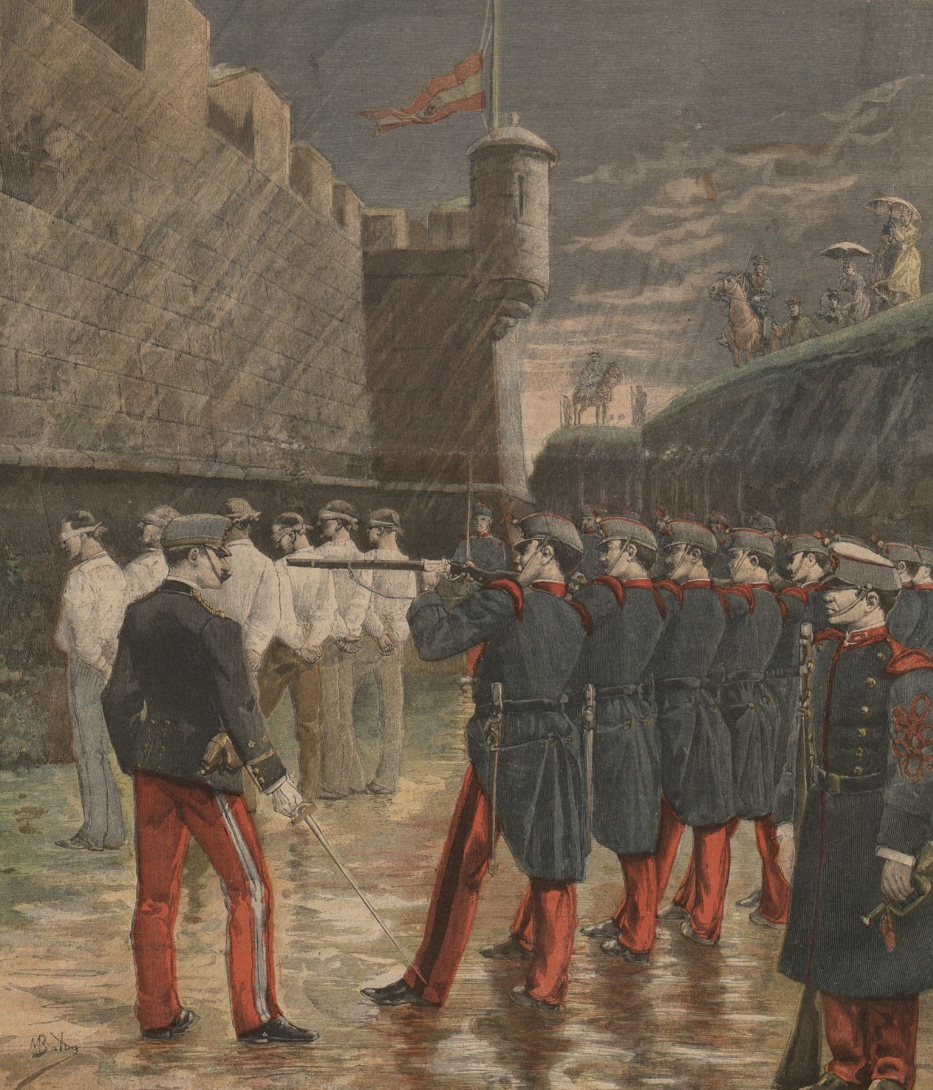
The execution of Manuel Ars, Josep Bernat, Mariano Cerezuela, Josep Codina, Josep Sàbat and Jaume Sogas

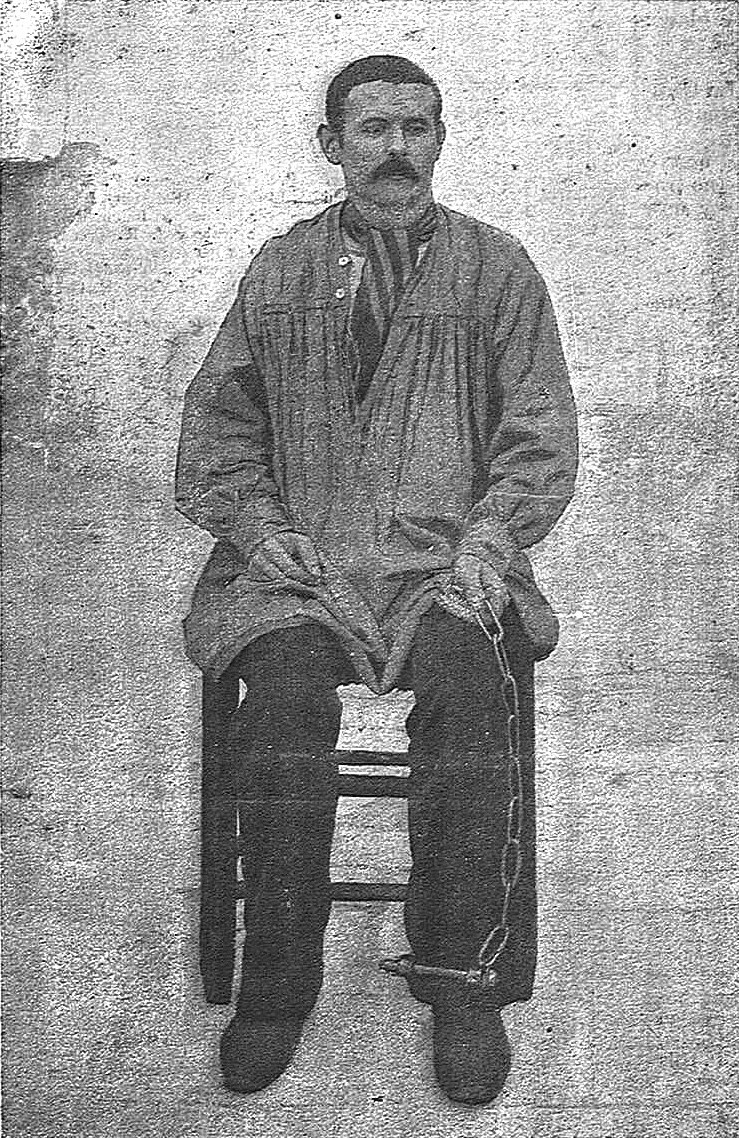
Salvador while in prison, photographed by La Campana de Gràcia

The anarchists who were charged with involvement in the Liceu bombing received a closed-door trial by a military tribunal and Montjuïc Castle. The military tribunal was presided over by lieutenant colonel Enrique Marzo, who rushed through the process, even skipping a number of steps, intending to root out a suspected anarchist conspiracy. Salvador confessed to sole responsibility for the Liceu bombing, but this was disregarded by the tribunal, which became fixated on allegations of a large anarchist conspiracy. The authorities reopened the Pallàs case and declared the imprisoned anarchists to have been his accomplices.

Two other people who confessed to participation in the attack were Mariano Cerezuela and Josep Codina, the latter of whom claimed to be the mastermind of the plot and the one who manufactured the bomb. Allegations soon began to circulate that Cerezuela and Codina had been forced to confess through torture. In an unpublished letter to El País, Cerzuela described his experience being tortured, including sleep deprivation, beatings and even genital mutilation, which had elicited his false confession. Accusations of torture and forced confessions were denied by the right-wing press, including El País, which continued to justify the extrajudicial punishment of the anarchist movement. Republican politician Baldomer Lostau wrote a letter to the Minister of War Marcelo Azcárraga, protesting against the torture of prisoners who had been detained after the Liceu bombing. There is a broad consensus among Spanish historians that torture took place during the process against the imprisoned anarchists.

On 20 May, Marzo sentenced Manuel Ars, Josep Bernat, Mariano Cerezuela, Josep Sàbat and Jaume Sogas to capital punishment; Joan Carbonell and Rafael Miralles were given life imprisonment. All of the defendants insisted that they had given forced confessions elicited through torture. Following a review by the Supreme Council of War and the Navy, Josep Codina was sentenced to execution and Francesc Vilarrubias and Domingo Mir were sentenced to life imprisonment. In a last letter to his son, Manuel Ars declared that he would die happy, having given his life for his ideals, and hoping that his death would expose the authoritarianism of the government. He encouraged his son to refute the charges against him, to study anarchism and to give his life for the cause if it were necessary. The condemned were brought into a chapel for religious council, but none except Sogas accepted. At 04:45, they were taken from the chapel to the castle moat and executed by firing squad in front of a crowd of 200 people. The execution took place the same day as the execution of the French anarchist terrorist Émile Henry, leading historian José Álvarez Junco to believe that the Spanish government was attempting to bury the story and protect itself from international condemnation. Most contemporary historians are of the opinion that the convicted anarchists were innocent.

In August 1894, Salvador changed his story about his motivations; rather than wanting revenge for the execution of Pallàs, he now said that he had begun to plan the bombing attack after he had been beaten by police in Valencia. He also claimed that his attack had been inspired by Peter Kropotkin's The Conquest of Bread, despite the book containing no advocacy of terrorism, which led some anarchists to doubt his anarchist convictions or his mental health. Peter Kropotkin privately sympathised with Salvador's attack, which he considered to be an act of desperation. He went on to express support for the assassination of Sadi Carnot in 1894 and the assassination of Antonio Cánovas in 1897.

At this time, reports spread that Salvador had renounced anarchism and converted back to Catholicism. Catholic newspapers publicised the story of his conversion and reported that his cell had become a shrine, with sacred images on the walls and religious books lining the shelves. Catholics began campaigning for clemency and printed photographs of the new convert, but the Civil Governor banned publication of his photograph. Salvador spent the last night of his life in his cell in Reina Amalia prison, surrounded by members of the clergy. At 08:00, on 21 November 1894, when he was led out of the prison onto the execution platform, he shouted to the gathered crowd "Long live the social revolution! Long live anarchy! Death to all religions!" and sang the first verse of Hijos del Pueblo. His "conversion" had been a ploy, in an attempt to escape from torture while in prison. He was then garroted and his body left on the platform until 16:00. He showed no remorse for the bombing.

== Aftermath ==
=== Montjuïc trials ===
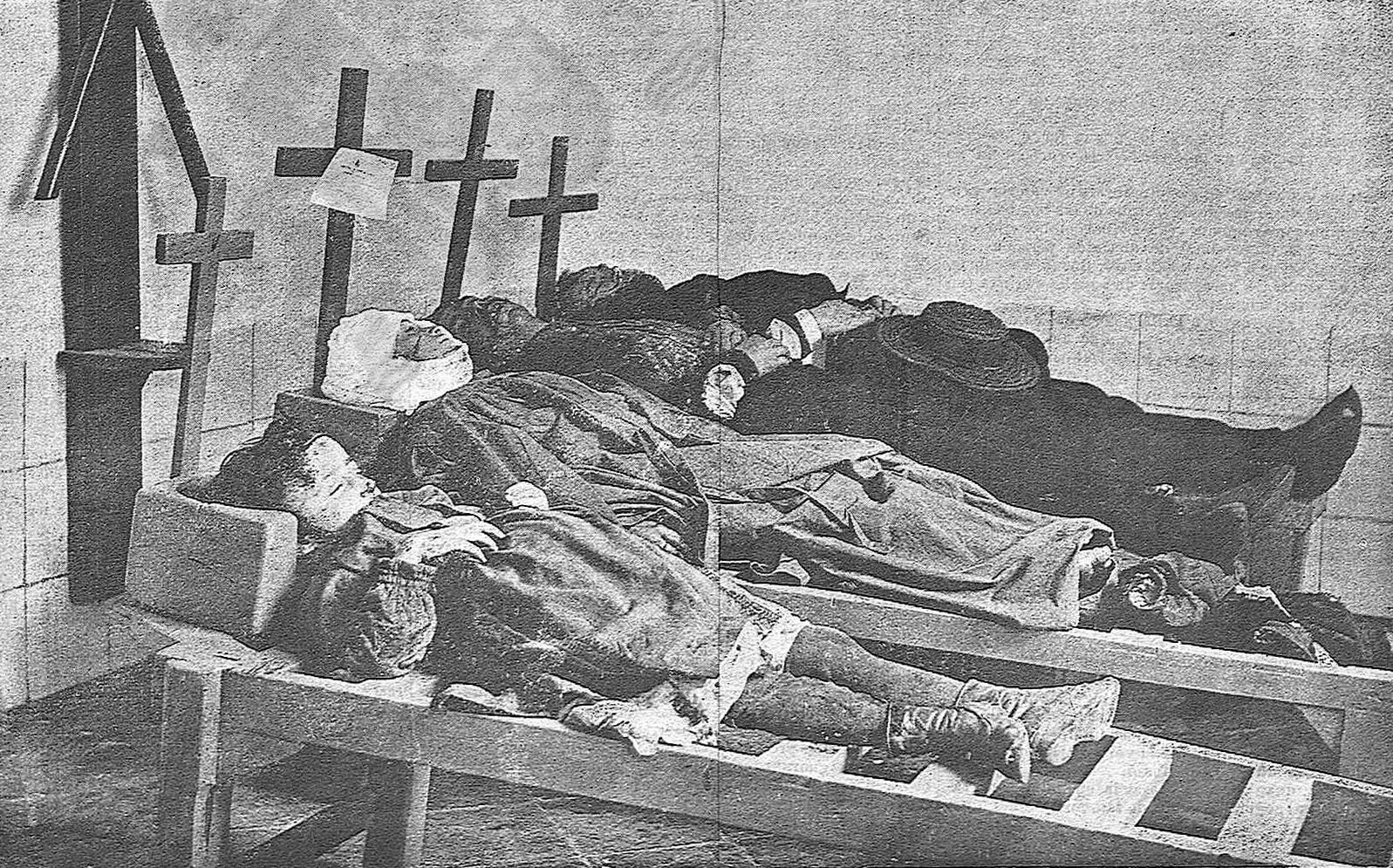
The bodies of children who were killed in the 1896 Barcelona Corpus Christi procession bombing, which provoked another crackdown against the anarchist movement in Spain

The bombings by Pallàs and Salvador provoked an increase in political repression against the anarchist movement, which saw its meeting spaces, publications and organisations shut down. Fears of propaganda of the deed heightened after the 1894 assassination of Sadi Carnot, which coming so soon after the bombings of Gran Via and the Liceu, made anarchist terrorism a continuing threat. In July 1894, the Spanish government passed an anti-anarchist law, which outlawed anarchist associations and publications, and punished the possession of explosives with life imprisonment or execution. For two years, the anti-anarchist legislation seemed to prevent the continuation of anarchist terrorism. But the 1896 Barcelona Corpus Christi procession bombing caused fears of anarchist terrorism to rise again, giving way to the extralegal prosecution of the anarchist movement.

Mass arrests were carried out against members of the anarchist movement, with as many as 600 people being detained. Many of those arrested had already been imprisoned in the wake of the Liceu bombing. Anarchist detainees expected similar levels of repression and torture to that which had followed the Liceu bombing, predicting the rise of a new Spanish Inquisition. At a demonstration in London, where English anarchists protested against the Montjuïc Trials, Peter Kropotkin pointed at that the Spanish state had been torturing prisoners since the Gran Via and Liceu bombings. During the subsequent Montjuïc trial, the anarchist writer Joan Montseny was reprimanded for publishing pamphlets that had reported on police abuse against the suspects of the Gran Via and Liceu bombings. Among the arrested were Teresa Claramunt and Lluís Más, who had both also been arrested following the Liceu bombing; and Àngela Vallés and Antònia Colom i Vicens, the widows of Pallàs and Salvador respectively. In April 1897, five people were sentenced to death: the main suspect, Tomàs Ascheri; and his alleged accomplices, Joan Alsina, Lluís Mas, Josep Molas and Antoni Nogués. On the day of the execution, 3 May 1897, and the day after, all functions were suspended at the Liceu, out of concerns about a repetition of the 1894 bombing.

=== Legacy ===
The wave of anarchist violence which started with the Liceu bombing, and led to assassination of three Spanish prime ministers by anarchists, culminated in 1909 with the Tragic Week, during which anarchist workers attacked and set fire to religious centres throughout Barcelona. The Catalan bourgeoisie and clergy, which was most directly affected by the anarchist violence and blamed the government in Madrid for its continuation, began to turn towards Catalan nationalism, with calls for Catalonia's autonomy or even independence from the Kingdom of Spain. Wealthy Catalans who supported Antoni Gaudí's construction of the Sagrada Familia conceived of the building as an expiatory chapel, built to atone for the city's growing radicalism and secularism. In 1899, Gaudí designed the Portal of the Rosary, which includes a reference to the Liceu bombing: a demon hands an object shaped like an Orsini bomb to an industrial worker, who implores Mary, mother of Jesus to help him resist temptation.

A fictionalised version of the bombing was later depicted in the 1943 novel Mariona Rebull, in which the titular character and her lover are killed in the attack. One survivor of the Liceu bombing, Catalan journalist Tomàs Caballé, wrote in 1945 that memories of the attack still elicited intense emotions within him. He wrote that his contemporary readers could not understand how "multiple later local, and above all global, events have hardened our hearts, weakening individual and collective sensibility". Joaquim Maria de Nadal i Ferrer wrote that it took some time before performances of the Liceu theatre returned to normalcy, although some seats were kept permanently empty in memory of the attack. In 1952, he mentioned that attendees still found themselves looking upwards at the roof during performances.

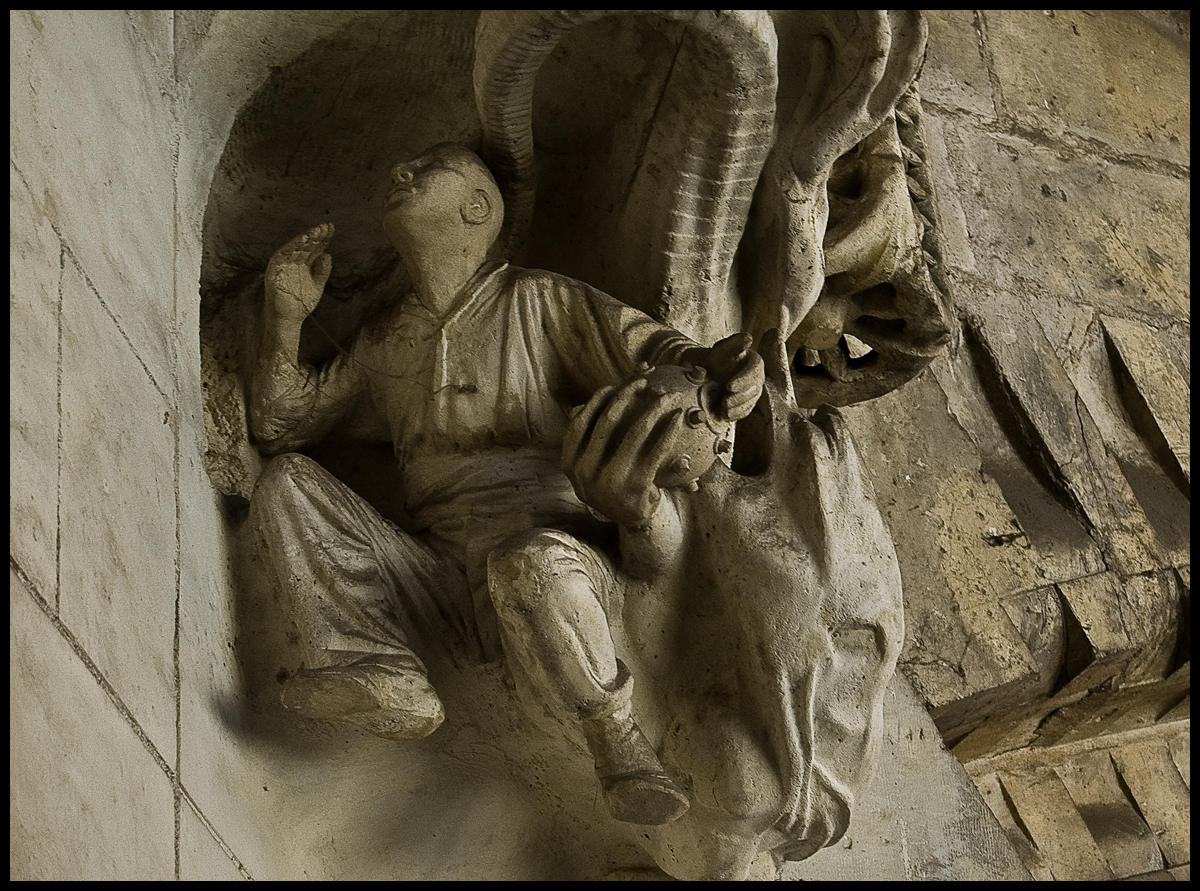
Depiction of an industrial worker being handed an Orsini bomb by a demon, on the Rosary Portal of the Sagrada Familia

=== Analysis ===
The Liceu bombing was atypical of anarchist terrorist attacks, which usually consist of assassinations against political officials, attacks against the police or symbolic destructions of buildings. Terrorism researcher Timothy Shanahan has described attacks such as the Liceu bombing, which target generalised groups of people rather than specific individuals, as "strategically indiscriminate". In his analysis of the revolutionary terrorism of the Spanish anarchist movement, Spanish historian Rafael Núñez Florencio also categorised the Liceu bombing as an indiscriminate attack. He contrasted it with the public assassination of state officials by self-sacrificing revolutionary martyrs, such as the assassination of Antonio Cánovas, and localised acts of retributive justice against perceived social injustice.

== Bibliography ==
- Bray, Mark (2022). The Anarchist Inquisition: Assassins, Activists, and Martyrs in Spain and France. Cornell University Press. ISBN 9781501761928. LCCN 2021038606.
- Casanova, Julián (April 2005). "Terror and Violence: The Dark Face of Spanish Anarchism". International Labor and Working-Class History. 67 (67): 79–99. doi:10.1017/S0147547905000098.
- Crossland, James (2021). "Radical Warfare's First "Superweapon": The Fears, Perceptions and Realities of the Orsini Bomb, 1858-1896" (PDF). Terrorism and Political Violence. 35 (2): 355–369. doi:10.1080/09546553.2021.1924692.
- Esenwein, George Richard (1989). "Terrorism and the Anarchist Movement, 1892–1894". Anarchist Ideology and the Working-Class Movement in Spain, 1868–1898. University of California Press. pp. 166–188. ISBN 0-520-06398-8. LCCN 89-4889.
- Friedman, John Block (2023). "Word into Image: Apocryphal Infancy Gospel Motifs on Antoni Gaudí's Sagrada Familía Nativity Façade". Digital Philology: A Journal of Medieval Cultures. 12 (2). Johns Hopkins University Press: 215–255. doi:10.1353/dph.2023.a911845.
- Holguin, Sandie (2019). Flamenco Nation: The Construction of Spanish National Identity. University of Wisconsin Press. ISBN 9780299321802.
- Jensen, Richard Bach (2014). The Battle Against Anarchist Terrorism: An International History, 1878–1934. Cambridge University Press. ISBN 9781107034051.
- Jensen, Richard Bach (2016). "Historical Lessons: An Overview of Early Anarchism and Lone Actor Terrorism". In Fredholm, Michael (ed.). Understanding Lone Actor Terrorism: Past Experience, Future Outlook, and Response Strategies. Routledge. doi:10.4324/9781315657622-2 (inactive 1 July 2025). ISBN 9781315657622. OCLC 938788878.
- Martínez Peñas, Leandro (2022). "The Instrumentalization of Justice in the Spanish Restoration: Public Order and Anarchist Subversion" (PDF). International Journal of Legal History and Institutions (6): 91–122. ISSN 2515-9208.
- McDonogh, Gary Wray (2014). "The Family and the City: Power and the Creation of Cultural Imagery". Good Families of Barcelona: A Social History of Power in the Industrial Era. Princeton: Princeton University Press. pp. 165–201. ISBN 978-1-4008-5823-1. OCLC 949946633.
- Preston, Paul (2020). "Violence, Corruption and the Slide to Disaster". A People Betrayed: A History of Corruption, Political Incompetence and Social Division in Modern Spain. HarperCollins. pp. 27–52. ISBN 9780871408686.
