= Pere Coromines i Montanya =

Catalan writer and politician

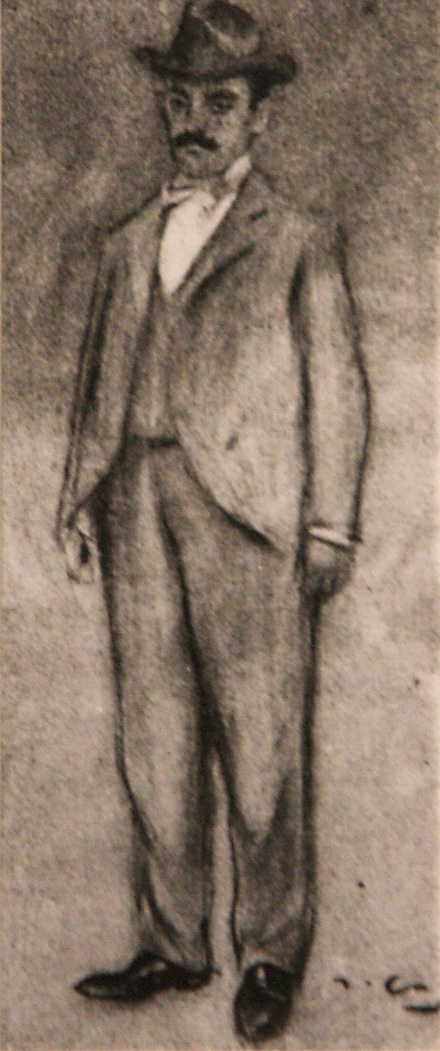
- Born: 6 May 1870; Barcelona
- Died: 30 November 1939 (aged 69); Buenos Aires

Pere Coromines i Montanya (Spanish: Pedro Corominas y Montaña) (Barcelona, 6 May 1870 - Buenos Aires, 30 November 1939) was a Catalan writer, politician, and economist from Spain.

== Early life ==
He was the son of Domingo Coromines i Frexanet and Maria Montanya i Mercader.

He earned a degree in Law at the University of Barcelona in 1894. During his youth, he kept contacts with Catalanist, Republican, Modernista, and even anarchist groups, due to his work at the magazine L’Avenç starting in 1895. He also kept contacts with anarchist groups through the cultural group Foc Nou, which he founded with Jaume Brossa i Roger, Alexandre Cortada i Serra, and Ignasi Iglésias Pujadas.

He joined Nicolas Salmerón's Republican Union.

His contact with anarchists drew the suspicions of the Spanish authorities. After the 1896 bombing of the Corpus Christi procession on the Carrer de Canvis Nous, he was arrested and tried in the Montjuïc Trial, where he faced the death penalty. In the end he was sentenced to 8 years in prison. In 1897, he was sent into exile in France by the Spanish authorities, which lasted until he was given amnesty by the Sagasta government in 1901.

Shortly after, he earned his doctorate in law and studied economics at University of Madrid. He took advantage of this stay to start a campaign to revise the sentences for the Montjuïc defendants, which was supported by well-known figures such as Miguel de Unamuno and Federico Urales.

== Career ==
In 1903 he returned to Barcelona to serve in the financial department of the City Council of Barcelona. In 1907 he wrote Memoria y proyecto de contrato con el Banco Hispano Colonial with mayor Idelfons Sunyol. He was a founding member of the Institut d’Estudis Catalans on June 18, 1907 in the History and Arqueology section, and later in 1911 in the Science section.

In 1901 he was named president of the Republican Nationalist Federal Union and became director of El Poble Català. He was elected to the City Council of Barcelona in 1909 and in 1910 and 1914 he became a member at the Spanish parliament. In 1914 he inspired the Sant Gervasi pact between RNFU and Lerroux's Radical Republican Party. Because of this failure he left active politics for a long period.

In 1916 he started working as a lawyer and held conferences in Madrid. He also worked as a secretary for the Bank of Catalonia.

He dedicated his efforts to literature during Primo de Rivera's dictatorship, and collaborated with publications including La Humanitat and Revista de Catalunya. He served as president of the Ateneu Barcelonès from 1928 to 1930.

He returned to politics with the establishment of the Second Spanish Republic. Due to his legal and political experience and prestige, Francesc Macià added him to the drafting commission of the Estatut de Núria, and in 1933 he appointed him counselor of Justice and Law. He was elected member of parliament for Esquerra Republicana de Catalunya (within the Front d’Esquerres) in the general elections of 1936, and served as General Museum Commissioner of the Generalitat de Catalunya during the Spanish civil war. At the end of the war, he migrated to Buenos Aires with his family, where he died shortly after.

== Personal life ==
He married teacher Celestina Vigneaux i Cibils and fathered philologist Joan Coromines i Vigneaux, mathematician Ernest Corominas i Vigneaux, psychologist Júlia Coromines i Vigneaux and five other children.

== Works ==
- Les presons imaginàries (1899)
- La vida austera (1908)
- Les hores d'amor serenes (1912)
- Les gràcies de l'Empordà (1919)
- Elogi de la civilització catalana (1921)
- Cartes d'un visionari (1921)
- A recés dels tamarius (1925)
- Les dites i facècies de l'estrenu filantrop en Tomàs de Bajalta, trilogia composta per Silèn (1925), Pigmalió (1928) i Prometeu (1934)
- Jardins de Sant Pol (1927)
- La mort de Joan Apòstol (1928)
- Les llàgrimes de sant Llorenç (1929)
- Pina, la italiana del dancing (1933)
- Interpretació del vuit-cents català (1933)
- Del meu comerç amb Joan Maragall (1935)
- El perfecte dandi i altres contes (1940)
