= Assassination of Antonio Cánovas del Castillo =

1897 murder of the Spanish Prime Minister

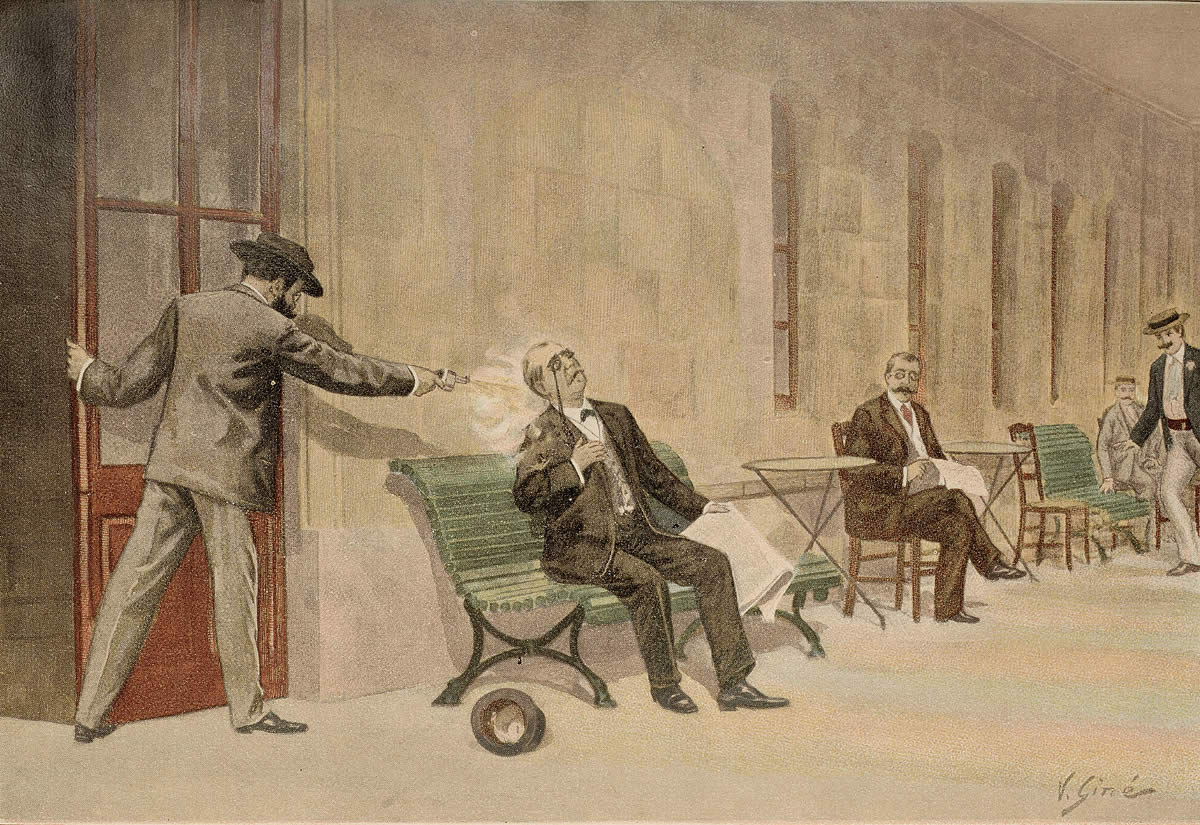
- Location: Mondragón, Gipuzkoa, Spain
- Date: 8 August 1897; 12:00 p.m.
- Attack type: Assassination
- Weapon: 11.17mm Webley British Bulldog revolver
- Victim: Antonio Cánovas del Castillo
- Assailant: Michele Angiolillo
- Motive: Revenge for the Montjuic trial

Italian anarchist Michele Angiolillo assassinated Spanish Prime Minister Antonio Cánovas del Castillo on 8 August 1897, in Gipuzkoa. The head of government had been vacationing in the Santa Águeda spa. The assassin was immediately arrested, tried, and executed. He justified the murder as revenge for torture during the Montjuïc trial.

== Background ==
Near the turn of the 20th century, as Barcelona experienced a wave of anarchist terrorist attacks, the June 1896 bombing of the Corpus Christi procession had great repercussions. With six dead and 42 injured, a harsh police repression led to the famous Montjuïc trial, in which 400 "suspects" were imprisoned in the Montjuïc Castle and brutally tortured, with their nails torn off, feet crushed, and skin burned by cigars. Of the 28 sentenced to death, five were executed. Another 59 were sentenced to life imprisonment and 63 were found innocent but deported to the Spanish Sahara. The Montjuïc trial had a significant international backlash, with doubts of the convictions based on torture-coerced confessions. The Spanish press campaigned against the government and "executioners". Alejandro Lerroux, editor of the republican Madrid newspaper El País, published a months-long series on the stories of those tortured and undertook a propaganda tour of La Mancha and Andalusia.

== Assassination ==
Michele Angiolillo was a printer by profession and on file by the Italian police as an anarchist. In 1895, he fled abroad to avoid a month and a half jail sentence for publishing subversive articles. He was likely in Barcelona during the time of the June 1896 Corpus Christi procession bombing. He left for France but was expelled in October, moving to Belgium and then to England. In London, he heard the stories of those tortured in the Montjuïc trial, and there he bought the pistol with which he would assassinate Cánovas del Castillo. Arriving in Paris, Angiolillo met the delegate of the Cuban insurgents seeking independence from Spain, Ramón Emeterio Betances, whom he asked for money to travel to Spain and assassinate Spanish Queen regent Maria Christina and Prime Minister Antonio Cánovas del Castillo. Betances gave him some money but told him that he condemned the murders. While in Paris, Angiolillo also met with Henri Rochefort, editor of the anarchist newspaper L'Intransigeant, which had been one of the most prominent publications in the international campaign to denounce Montjuïc's torture.

He traveled to Madrid, where he came into contact with the republican and anticlerical journalist José Nakens. Angiolillo introduced himself as a journalist under the false name of Emilio Rinaldini and asked Nakens for help. Nakens gave him some money. As he was departing, Angiolillo told him about his plan to attack the regent, the prime minister, and the young king Alfonso XIII, then an 11-year-old boy. Nakens did not believe him, although he later admitted that even if he had believed him, Nakens would not have interfered, as it was a "political crime".

At noon on 8 August 1897, Angiolillo approached the Spanish prime minister Cánovas del Castillo, who was reading a newspaper on a bench in the Guipúzcoa resort of Santa Águeda, where the prime minister had been vacationing, and fired three revolver shots at him. The murderer was arrested and tried immediately. During the trial, he justified his crime as retaliation for the torture of the Corpus Christi procession bombing subjects in the Montjuïc trial, for which he held the prime minister responsible. Angiolillo also declared his solidarity with those living in misery, his rejection of social injustice, and his love for anarchism. He also said that he had acted alone, although there are doubts that this was true because he had discussed his plans with several people, although he also denied it during the trial. He was sentenced to death and the sentence was carried out by garrote vil on 20 August 1897, only eleven days after committing the murder.

== Aftermath ==
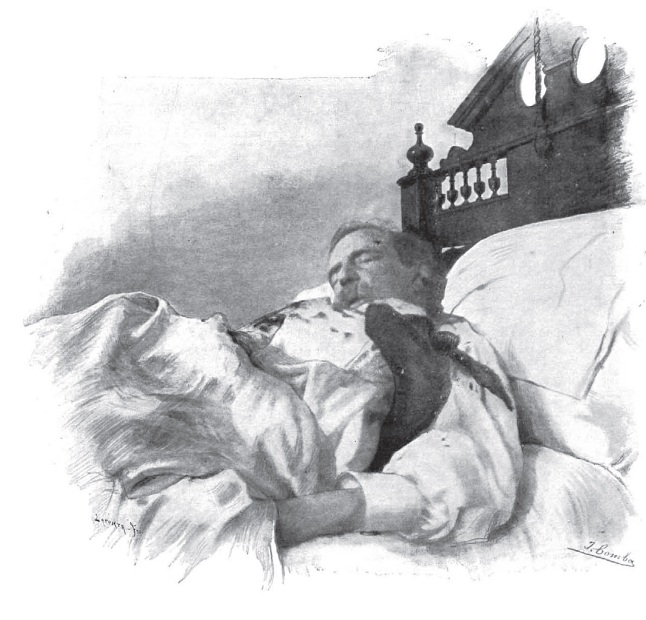
Drawing of Cánovas del Castillo's corpse

European and American press coverage speculated on whether the attack against the prime minister of the Spanish government was part of a vast international anarchist conspiracy. The Times affirmed that the crime had been the work of a fanatic and stressed that there was no evidence of an international organization behind it, but requested that the police be both alert and not undertake exceptional measures. The newspaper explained the attack by recalling the torture of the Montjuïc trial. Its shadow, as the historian Juan Avilés Farré has pointed out, "continued to cloud the image of the Spanish Government even in the mournful days of the death of Cánovas".

The assassination of Cánovas briefly ended the 1890s series of anarchist terrorist attacks in Spain. From 1903 on, attacks would continue for decades. This was unlike other countries, such as France and the United States, in which violent attacks subsided as the anarchist movement dissipated. One of the possible explanations for the persistence of anarchist terrorism in Spain, according to historian Avilés Farré, was the mishandling of the Spanish authorities' response: simultaneously "barbaric, illegal and ineffective" in substituting repressive cruelty for effective police and legal work. For example, Barcelona lacked a sufficiently large and capable police force to face the challenge posed by the 1890s attacks and instead turned to massive raids and a torture program, both in the absence of evidence. Alternatively, France used its police and legal system to convict and guillotine their four terrorists by law and without "prolonged arbitrary detentions, torture to obtain confessions, or sentences with dubious legal grounds", resulting in an end to anarchist terrorism in France in 1894.

== Bibliography ==
- Avilés Farré, Juan (2013). La Daga y la dinamita: los anarquistas y el nacimiento del terrorismo (in Spanish). Barcelona: Tusquets. ISBN 978-84-8383-753-5. OCLC 892212465.
- Dardé, Carlos (1996). La Restauración, 1875–1902: Alfonso XII y la regencia de María Cristina (in Spanish). Madrid: Historia 16-Temas de Hoy. ISBN 978-84-7679-317-6.
- Suárez Cortina, Manuel [in Spanish] (2006). La España Liberal (1868–1917): política y sociedad (in Spanish). Madrid: Síntesis. ISBN 978-84-9756-415-1.
