= Michele Angiolillo =

Italian anarchist and Spanish Prime Minister assassin (1871–1897)

Michele Angiolillo Lombardi
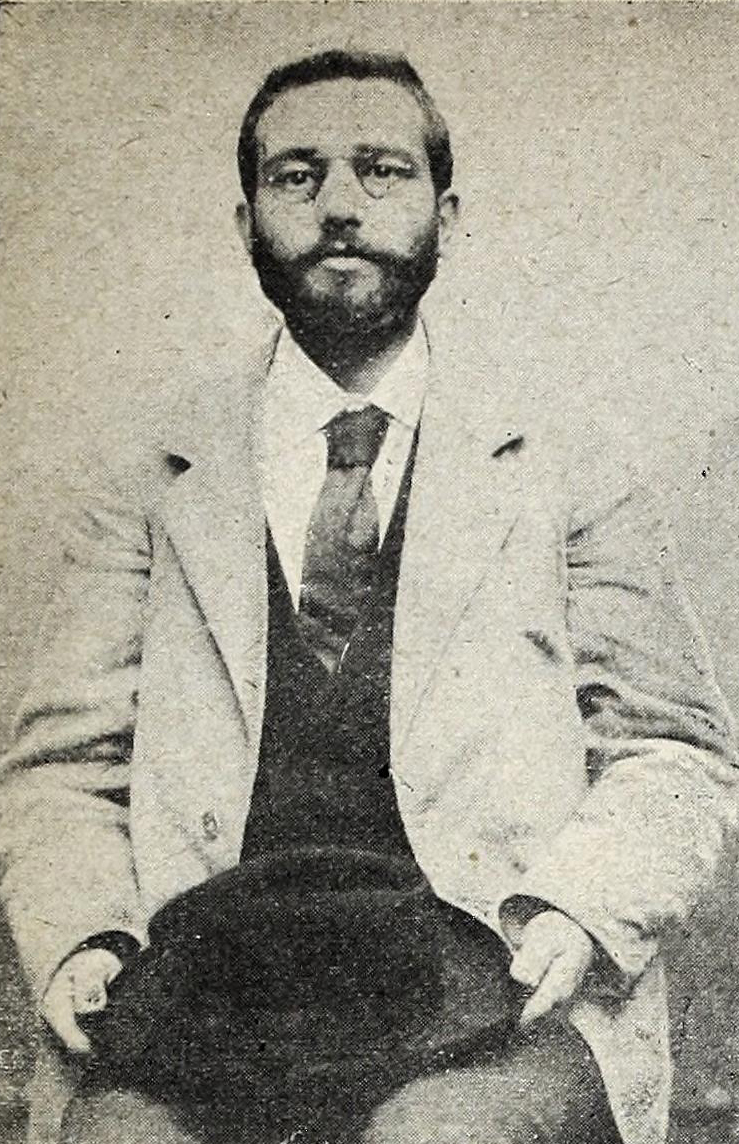
- Born: 5 June 1871; Foggia, Italy
- Died: 20 August 1897 (aged 26); Bergara, Basque Country, Spain
- Movement: Anarchism
- Status: Executed by garrote
- Motive: Revenge for the Montjuïc trial
- Penalty: Capital punishment

Details
- Victims: Antonio Cánovas del Castillo
- Killed: 1
- Weapon: .44 Bull Dog revolver

Michele Angiolillo Lombardi (Italian pronunciation: [miˈkɛːle andʒoˈlillo]; 5 June 1871 – 20 August 1897) was an Italian anarchist. He assassinated Spanish prime minister Antonio Cánovas del Castillo on 8 August 1897 and was captured and executed by Spanish authorities later that month.

== Motive and the Montjuïc trial ==
On 7 June 1896, a bomb was thrown at the Corpus Christi procession in Barcelona. At least twelve people died and 45 were seriously injured. The crime, which was attributed by police to an unidentified anarchist, precipitated an aggressive reprisal against Spanish anarchists, communists, socialists, and republicans, in what became known as the Montjuïc trial: 300 alleged revolutionaries were jailed at Montjuïc Fortress, and confessions were extracted by torture. Of the 87 prisoners taken to trial at Montjuïc, eight received death sentences; five executions were carried out.

Angiolillo, was at the time, working as a printer in the little-known Typographia institution, the section of the British printer's union that was reserved for foreigners. On May 30, 1897, Angiolillo, among at least ten thousand other people, attended a demonstration in Trafalgar Square against the brutal repression of worker's rights movements within Spain, specifically under Cánovas. Organized by the Spanish Atrocities Committee led by the anarchist Joseph Perry, a wide range of activists spoke to the crowd, including Fernando Tarrida del Mármol and Charles Malato. Malato, in his speech, asked who would avenge the people who had died under the regime of Cánovas.

After the protest, Angiolillo personally met with Francisco Gana, who had been tortured at Montjuïc. The German anarchist Rudolf Rocker, who was also present, wrote the following about the meeting:

That night when Gana showed us his crippled limbs, and the scars over his entire body left by the tortures, we understood that it is one thing to read about such matters, but quite another to hear about them from the very lips of the victims" ... "We all sat there as if turned to stone, and it was some minutes before we could utter a few words of indignation. Only Angiolillo said not a word. A little later, he suddenly rose to his feet, uttered a laconic goodbye, and abandoned the house...This was the last time I saw him.

== Assassination of Cánovas del Castillo ==
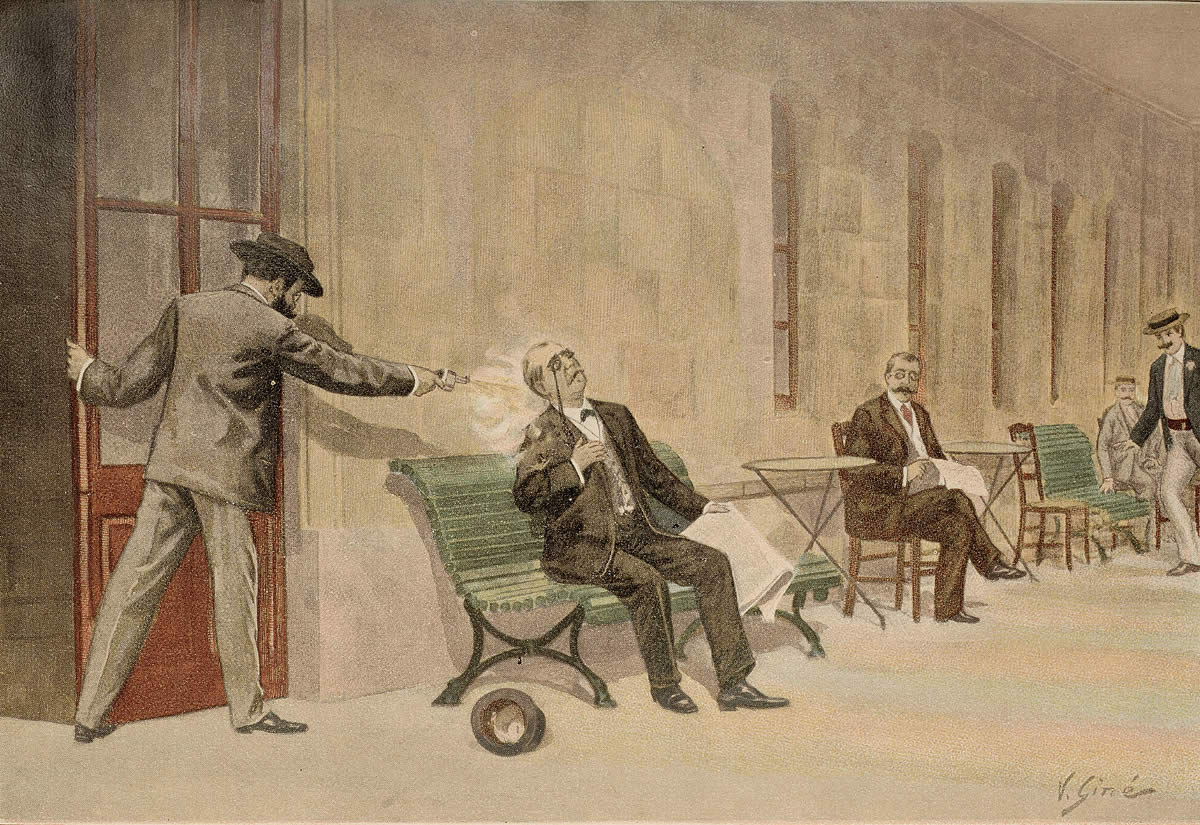
Killing of Cánovas del Castillo by Angiolillo

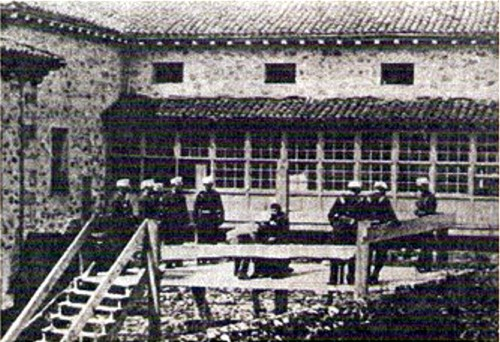
Execution of Angiolillo by garrote vil

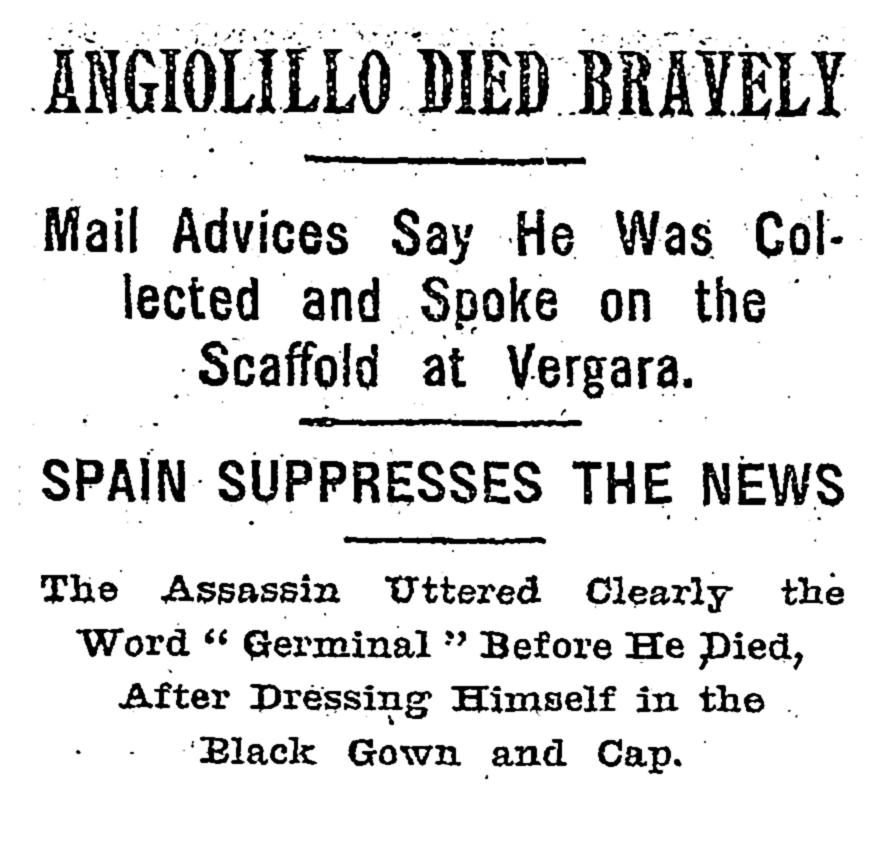
New York Times headline after his execution. Michele Angiolillo uttered clearly the word "Germinal" before he died.

Under a false identity of a reporter for the Il Popolo newspaper by the name of Emilio Rinaldini, Michele Angiolillo travelled to Spain from London, passing through Paris and Bordeaux. When he reached Madrid, he learned that Cánovas had travelled to the thermal bath resort of Santa Águeda (now a psychiatric hospital) in Mondragón, Guipúzcoa, and decided to pursue him there. On 8 August 1897, Angiolillo found Cánovas alone and shot him dead. The Prime Minister's wife hurried to the scene, shouting "Murderer! Murderer!" after the gunman. Angiolillo, in turn, bowed and declared, "Pardon, Madame. I respect you as a lady, but I regret that you were the wife of that man." The repression and mass torture at Montjuich was a direct factor behind Michele Angiolillo's decision to assassinate Cánovas, and he claimed in his defence speech to be "no assassin, but rather an executioner", calling Cánovas, among other things, the personification of the greed of the bourgeoisie and the tyranny of power.

About Angiolillo, the New York Times wrote:

Angiolillo allowed the authorities to capture him and vehemently denied other parties' involvement in the assassination. He was executed by garrote in the nearby town of Vergara.

There is some evidence that he originally planned to kill one or two young members of the Spanish royal family, but was dissuaded by Puerto Rican nationalist leader Ramón Emeterio Betances, who suggested Cánovas del Castillo as a target instead. Betances provided logistical assistance for Angiolillo's safe travel into Spain, as well as some money.

== Legacy ==
There is a street named after him in Foggia.

== Bibliography ==
- Anderson, Benedict Richard O'Gorman (2007). Under Three Flags: Anarchism and the Anti-Colonial Imagination. Verso. ISBN 9781844670901. OCLC 886542241.
- Tamburini, F. (1996). "Michele Angiolillo e l'assassinio di Cánovas del Castillo". Spagna Contemporanea. 9.
- Tamburini, F. (1997). "Michele Angiolillo el anarquista que asesinó a Cánovas del Castillo". Historia 16.
- Tamburini, F. (2000). "Betances, los mambises italianos y Michele Angiolillo, in Pasión por la libertad, Actas del coloquio internacional". El Independentismo Puertorriqueño de Betances a Nuestros Días.
- "Michele Angiolillo Anarchico di Michele Gualano". Edizioni Il Castello. 2004.
- Gualano, M. (2013). Questionario per il destino - Storia di un anarchico giustiziere (romanzo). Edizioni Il Castello. ISBN 978-88-6572-100-1.
- Ojeda Reyes, Félix (2001). El Desterrado de París: Biografía del Dr. Ramón Emeterio Betances (1827–1898). Puerto Rico: Ediciones Puerto.
- Shubert, Adrian; Esenwein, George Richard (1989). Anarchist ideology and the working-class movement in Spain, 1868–1898. Berkeley: University of California Press. ISBN 0520063988. OCLC 19554399.
- Maura, J. Romero (1968). "Terrorism in Barcelona and Its Impact on Spanish Politics 1904-1909". Past and Present (41): 130–183. doi:10.1093/past/41.1.130. ISSN 0031-2746.
- Media related to Michele Angiolillo at Wikimedia Commons
