= Orsini bomb =

19th century anarchist explosive devices

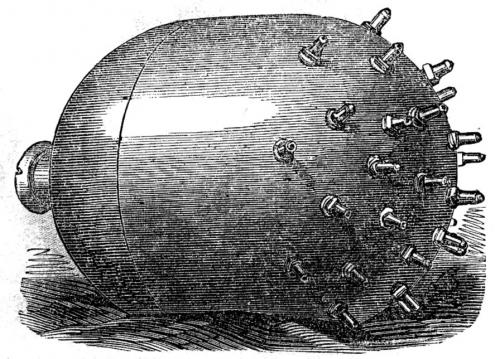
Orsini bomb, 1858.

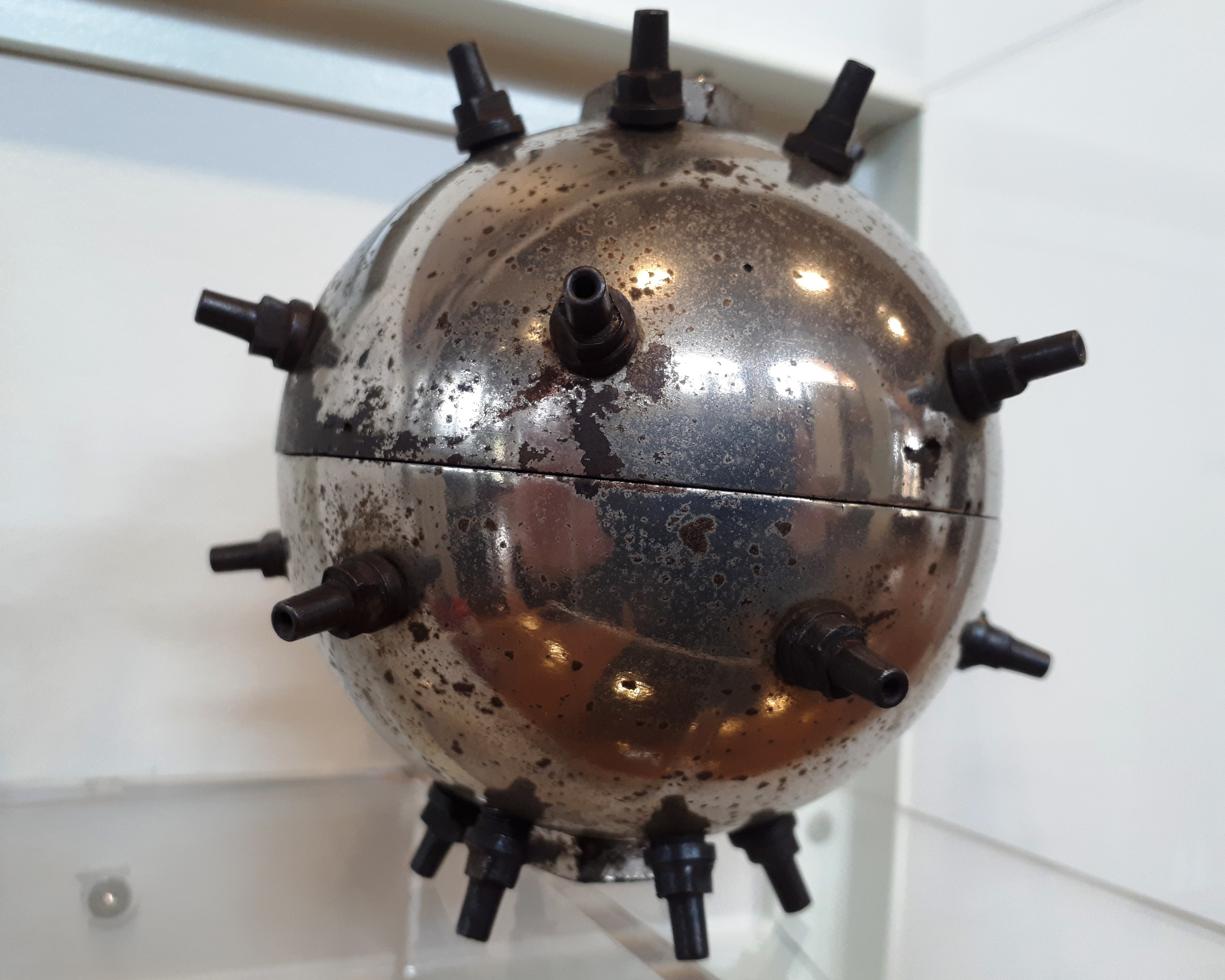
Unexploded Orsini bomb from 1893 on display at MUHBA.

The Orsini bomb was a terrorist improvised explosive device built by and named after Felice Orsini and used as a hand grenade on 14 January 1858 in an unsuccessful attack on Napoleon III. The weapons were somewhat commonly used during a wave of militant anarchist violence in the latter half of the 19th century in Europe, and surplus bombs were also used by the Confederacy during the American Civil War. The design is reminiscent of modern impact fused grenades, such as the Soviet RGO hand grenades. Orsini bombs were designed to remove "the uncertainty of slow burning fused weapons".

== Development ==
The bomb had a unique design for its time, and instead of having a fuse or timer, the bomb had numerous pins around it. The pins were filled with mercury fulminate and when the pins sensed contact on any angle with an object, it would immediately trigger the detonation. The bomb was designed by Felice Orsini, an Italian exile living in England, while the casing of the bomb was made by English gunmaker Joseph Taylor. The bomb was designed and created in Birmingham, England but was tested by Taylor in Sheffield and Devon.

== Historic use ==
=== Assassination Attempt on Napoleon III ===
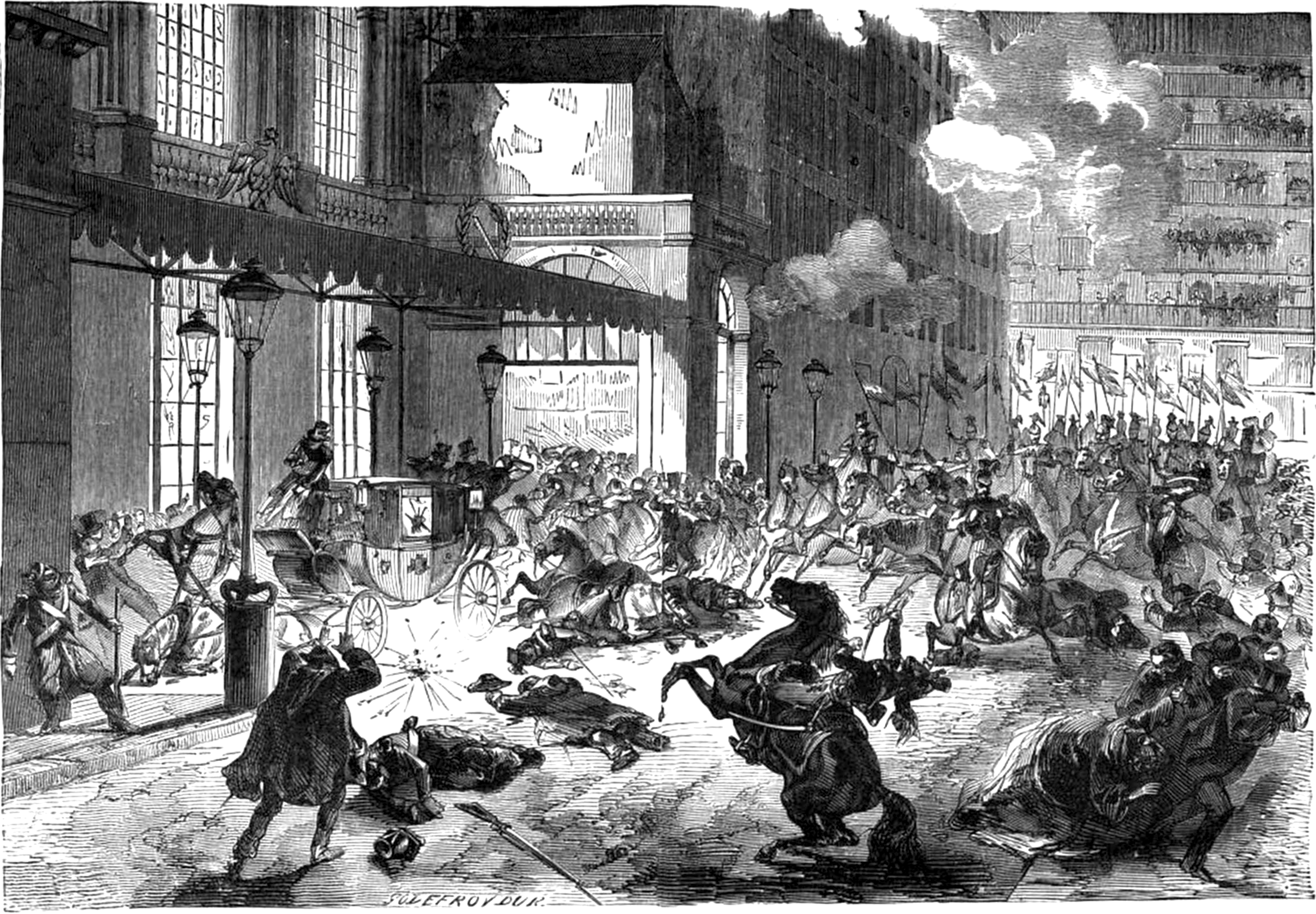
An engraving depicting the assassination attempt on Napoleon III

After thorough testing, Taylor provided the bomb to Orsini and smuggled them into France disguised as "gas machinery." Taylor later claimed that he thought the device was a genuine piece of explosive ordnance of a novel design. The bomb was originally created in an attempt to kill Napoleon III in 1858. This act and the design of the bombs may have been inspired by a previous attempt to kill Napoleon I in 1800 with an improvised explosive.

Orsini created 12 bombs for the plot. The plan was that he and three accomplices would throw four bombs at the Emperor when he emerged from his carriage, but they all missed their targets. However, they did still manage to kill 10 and wound 157. A description of the plot written by a participant was found and said: "My grenade contained 4 pounds of powder. All the conspirators had their respective posts previously assigned to them. Four hand-grenades were to be thrown by Gomez, myself, Orsini, and Pieri, respectively. ... throwing my grenade right under the fore part of the carriage, and dropping myself among some dead horses and struggling men, I watched the effects of the explosion. The horses and the driver were instantly killed[.]"

=== Liceu bombing ===
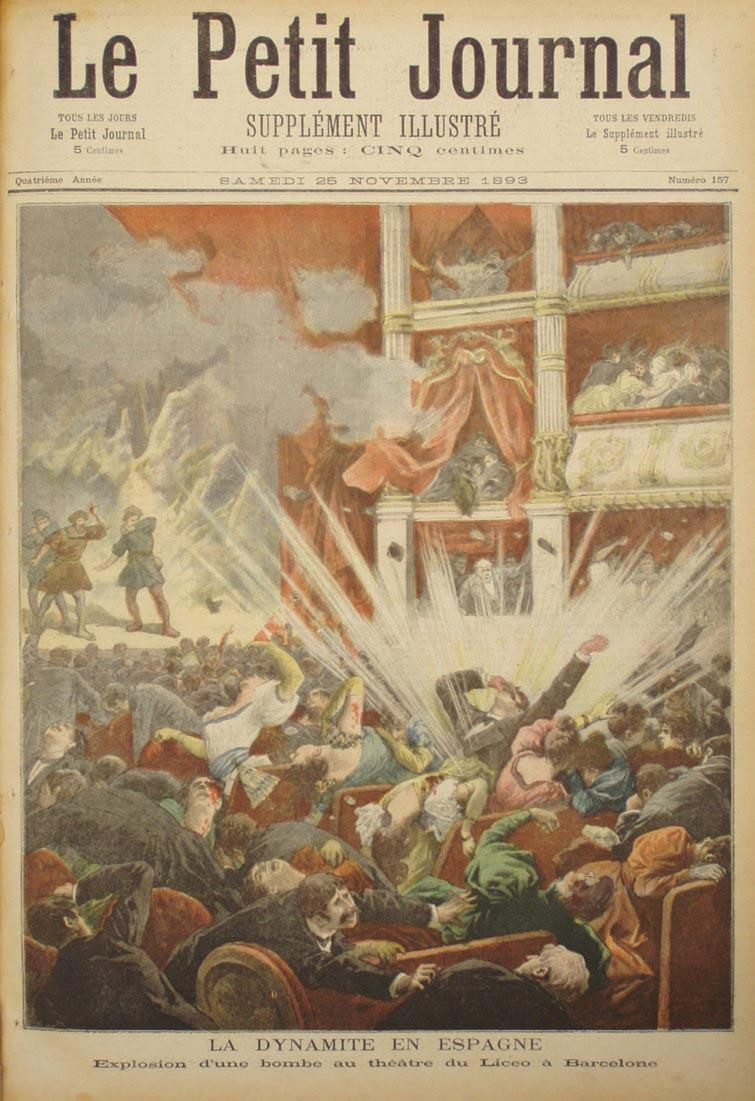
Front page of Le Petit Journal, 25 Nov 1893, depicting the attack on the Liceu Theater by the anarchist Santiago Salvador.

The Orsini bomb was later used in several plots by anarchists, when they could not obtain dynamite. It was also the bomb used in an attack during Gioachino Rossini's William Tell opera at the Liceu Theater in Barcelona in 1893 by anarchist Santiago Salvador; resulting in the death of 20 people and wounding 30, though only one of the bombs detonated. One of the unexploded bombs was preserved at the Barcelona City History Museum (MUHBA) and later lent to the Van Gogh Museum in 2007 for an exhibit on late 19th century Barcelona. (Coincidentally, the Emperor Napoleon III and his wife were on their way to see the same opera when Orsini had made the attempt on their lives over 35 years earlier.)

== General and cited references ==
- Anderson, Benedict R. O'G. (2007). Under Three Flags: Anarchism and the Anti-Colonial Imagination. London: Verso.
- Davies, Roger (30 Dec. 2012). "The Felix Orsini Bomb". Standing Well Back: IED and EOD Evolutions. Accessed 23 May 2017.
- Beale, Joseph H., et al. "Attempt on the Life of Louis Napoleon" (1884). Gay's Standard History of the World's Great Nations ... from the Complete Histories by Charles Knight. New York: W. Gay and Co. pp. 883–885.
