= Timothy Shanahan (philosopher) =

American philosopher (born 1960)

- Born: December 22, 1960 (age 65); Syracuse, New York

Education
- Education: University of Notre Dame

Philosophical work
- Era: Contemporary philosophy
- Region: Western philosophy
- Main interests: Philosophy of science, philosophy of film

Timothy Shanahan (born December 22, 1960) is an American philosopher and Professor of Philosophy at Loyola Marymount University. He is known for his research on philosophy of science, philosophy and film, and the morality of terrorism.

== Books ==
- Reason and Insight: Western and Eastern Perspectives on the Pursuit of Moral Wisdom, 2nd edition (Belmont, CA: Wadsworth, 2003).
- The Evolution of Darwinism: Selection, Adaptation, and Progress in Evolutionary Biology (New York: Cambridge University Press, 2004).
- Philosophy 9/11: Thinking about the War on Terrorism (Chicago: Open Court, 2005).
- The Provisional Irish Republican Army and the Morality of Terrorism (Edinburgh: Edinburgh University Press, 2009).
- Philosophy and Blade Runner (Houndmills: Palgrave Macmillan, 2014).
- Blade Runner 2049: A Philosophical Exploration (London & New York: Routledge, 2019).

== See also ==
- Darwinism
- philosophy of biology
