= Felice Orsini =

Italian revolutionary; failed assassin of Napoleon III in 1858

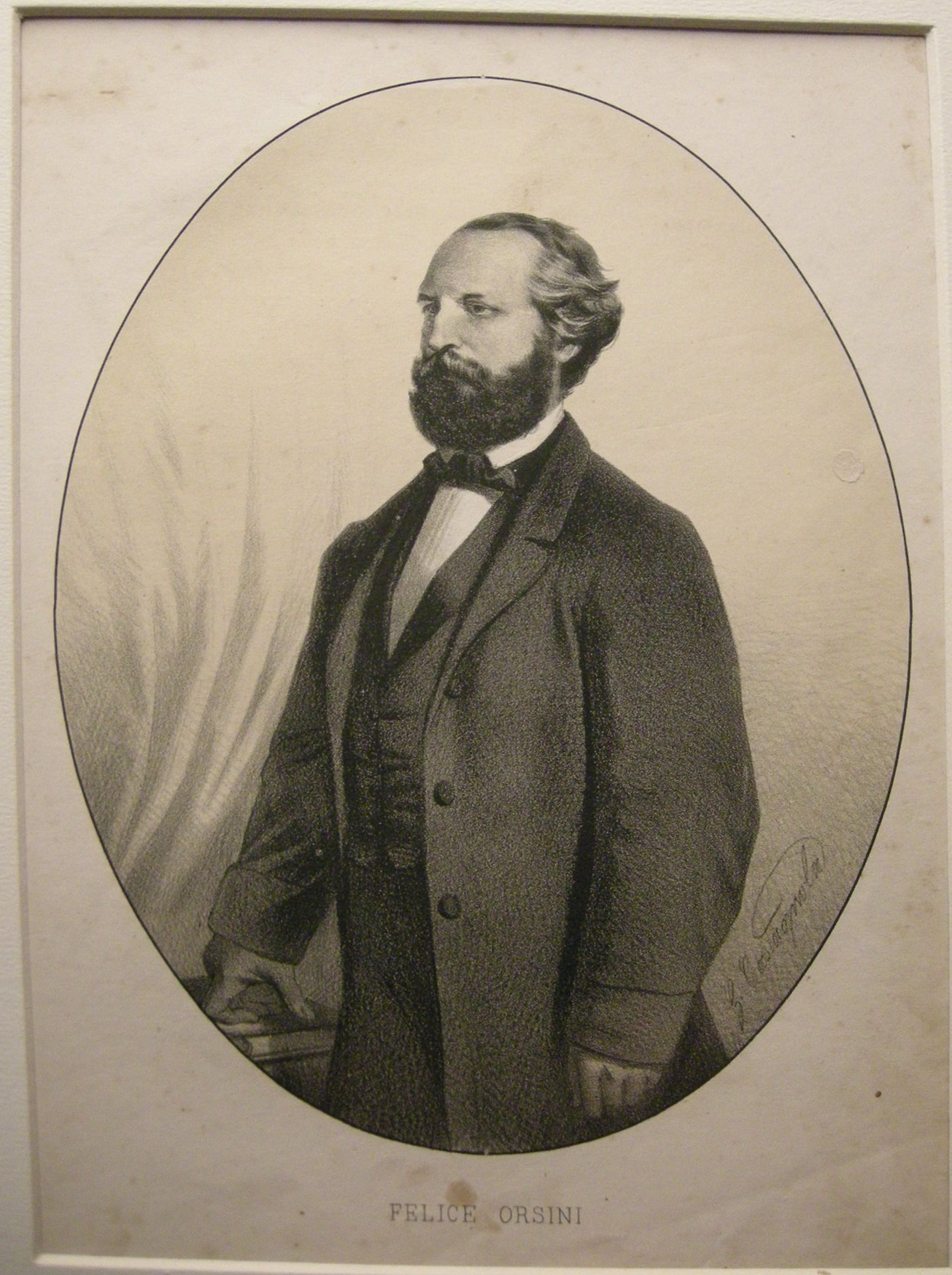
- Felice Orsini
- Born: Felice Orsini; 10 December 1819; Meldola, Romagna, Papal States
- Died: 13 March 1858 (aged 38)
- Cause of death: Execution by guillotine

Felice Orsini (Italian pronunciation: [feˈliːtʃe orˈsiːni]; French: [fəlis ɔʁsini]; 10 December 1819 – 13 March 1858) was an Italian revolutionary and leader of the Carbonari who tried to assassinate Napoleon III, Emperor of the French.

== Early life ==
Felice Orsini was born at Meldola in Romagna, then part of the Papal States. He was encouraged to become a priest, but he abandoned that lifestyle and became an ardent liberal, joining the Giovane Italia, a political society founded by Giuseppe Mazzini.

== Arrest and revolutionary activities ==
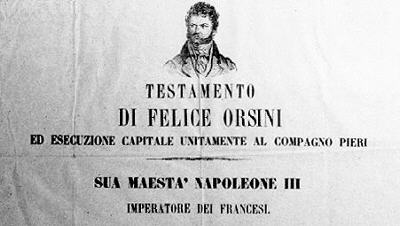
1850s notice depicting Orsini

Orsini was arrested in 1844 along with his father, implicated in revolutionary plots and condemned to imprisonment for life. The new pope, Pius IX set him free, and he led a company of young Romagnols in the First War of Italian Independence in 1848, distinguishing himself in the engagements at Treviso and Vicenza.

Orsini was elected member of the Roman Constituent Assembly in 1849, and after the fall of the revolutionary republic in Rome, he conspired against the papal autocracy in the interest of the Mazzinian party. Mazzini sent him on a secret mission to Hungary, but he was arrested in 1854 and imprisoned at Mantua. He escaped a few months later using a tiny saw to cut through two grids of bars, climbed out of the window 100 feet above ground and slid down using a rope he had made of bedsheets. Passing as a sympathetic peasant, he managed to get past the Austrian guards.

In 1856, he briefly visited Great Britain and received a favourable welcome. The daily news had published the first English translation of his tale of escape. He published The Memoirs and Adventures of Felice Orsini in 1856. In 1857, he also published an account of his prison experiences in English under the title of The Austrian Dungeons in Italy, which led to a rupture between him and Mazzini. Then he began to negotiate with Ausonio Franchi, editor of the Ragione of Turin, which he proposed to make the organ of pure republicans.

Orsini became convinced that Napoleon III was the chief obstacle to Italian independence and the principal cause of the anti-liberal reaction throughout Europe. He plotted his assassination with the logic that after the emperor's death, France would rise in revolt and the Italians could exploit the situation to revolt themselves. He went to Paris in 1857 to conspire against the emperor.

At the end of 1857, Orsini briefly visited England, where he contacted gunsmith Joseph Taylor and asked him to make six copies of a bomb of Orsini's own design; it would explode on impact and used fulminate of mercury as an explosive. The bomb was tested in Sheffield and Devon with the aid of French radical Simon Bernard. Satisfied, Orsini returned to Paris with the bombs and contacted other conspirators, Giovanni Andrea Pieri, Antonio Gomez and Carlo di Rudio (later changed to Charles DeRudio).

== Assassination attempt on Louis Napoleon ==
On the evening of 14 January 1858, as the Emperor and Empress were on their way to the theatre in the Rue Le Peletier, the precursor of the Opera Garnier, to see Gioacchino Rossini's William Tell, Orsini and his accomplices threw three bombs at the imperial carriage. The first bomb landed among the horsemen in front of the carriage. The second bomb wounded the animals and smashed the carriage glass. The third bomb landed under the carriage and seriously wounded a policeman who was hurrying to protect the occupants. Eight people were killed and 142 wounded, though the emperor and empress were unhurt. They judged it best to proceed to the performance and appear before the public in their box.

Orsini himself was wounded on the right temple and stunned. He tended his wounds and returned to his lodgings, where police found him the next day.

The attempted assassination actually increased Napoleon III's popularity. Because the bombs had been made and tested in England, it caused a brief anti-British furore in France because of suspicion of British involvement. The Emperor refused to escalate the situation and the indignation eventually died down.

== Letter to Napoleon III ==
On 11 February Orsini wrote his famous letter to Napoleon, in which he exhorted him to take up the cause of Italian independence—a cause Napoleon III had already supported in his youth. Modern historians have even suspected that Napoleon wrote some of the letter himself. He addressed another letter to the youth of Italy and condemned political assassination.

== Judgment ==
Orsini was sentenced to death and went calmly to the guillotine on 13 March 1858. His accomplice Pieri was executed, and Gomez was condemned to hard labour for life. Di Rudio was sentenced to death, which was commuted to life imprisonment on Devil's Island near Cayenne, whence he escaped, and he later went to America. He became an infantryman and later an officer in the United States Army, and served in the American Civil War. After the war, he gained a Regular Army commission in the infantry, later switching to the cavalry, and was appointed to the U.S. 7th Cavalry, and participated in — and survived — the 1876 Battle of the Little Bighorn. He served many years in the Army, retiring in the 1890s.
