= 1896 Barcelona Corpus Christi procession bombing =

Terrorist incident in Catalonia, Spain

- Part of Early Anarchism in Spain
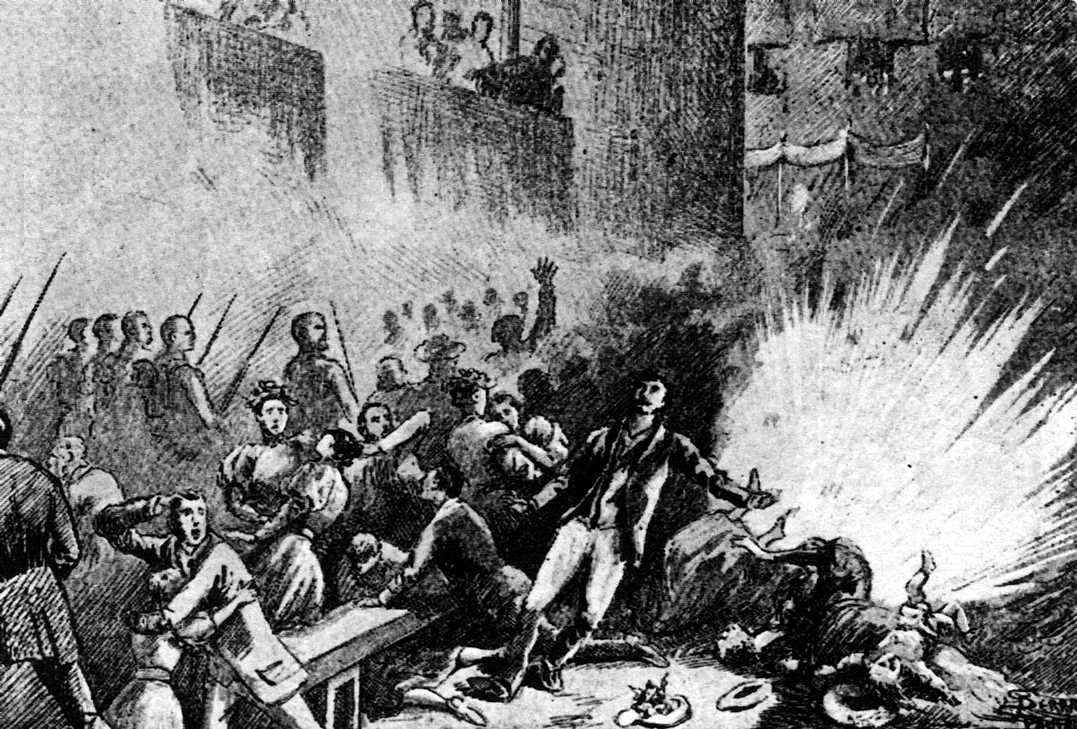
- Illustration of the bombing
- Location: 41°22′58″N 2°10′54″E; Barcelona, Catalonia, Spain
- Date: 7 June 1896; 09:00
- Attack type: Bombing
- Weapon: Orsini bomb
- Deaths: 12
- Injuries: 70
- Perpetrator: Disputed

The 1896 Barcelona Corpus Christi procession bombing was an attack carried out on the Feast of Corpus Christi procession in Barcelona on 7 June 1896. The identity of the perpetrators is disputed: the attack was attributed to anarchists but this was a result of forced confessions through torture.

== Background ==
Anarchism in Spain had been increasingly popular among workers' groups since the 1870s. The continual failure of general strikes as a tool for galvanizing change to working conditions combined with the violent repression of the state against the strikes (such as the Rio Tinto massacre) disappointed many, and the advocacy for use of violence began to take hold. In Catalonia, radical anarchist sentiment was particularly strong and previous attacks had been carried out by Paulí Pallàs against Arsenio Martínez Campos in September 1893 and by Santiago Salvador at the Liceu Theatre in November 1893. Both assailants were soon executed and in 1894 the government began an outright suppression of anarchism.

== Bombing ==
A small group of anarchists originally planned to bomb the Corpus Christi procession on 6 June 1896, at Barcelona Cathedral. The group, led by Nogues Molas, abandoned the plot at the last minute, but another group convened the next day for the next stage of the procession. A single bomb was dropped from a building above on the procession as it passed through Carrer dels Canvis Nous street at 09:00 on 7 June 1896. Three congregants were killed instantly and many others were wounded. Another nine would die from their injuries in the following days.

The identity of the perpetrator or perpetrators is disputed and remains controversial. Anarchists at the time denied any role in the bombing as its intended target, poorer working-class churchgoers, did not align with typical propaganda of the deed actions that targeted the rich bourgeoisie. However, anti-clerical sentiments are found in some late 19th century anarchist circles, so the symbol of the Catholic Church could have been the intended target.

Trade unionist and militant anarchist Tomás Ascheri is the most commonly accepted perpetrator and was accused and tried for the attack, although he denied his role until a confession was obtained under torture in 1897. Some anarchists claimed that a French agitator, François Girault, later confessed to the attack before fleeing to Argentina.

== Aftermath ==
The infamous Montjuïc trials took place in 1897 where 87 alleged conspirators were accused and tried. Many of the detainees were outspoken against the use of violence and condemned the attack. Five defendants were sentenced to death and executed, including Ascheri, and another 67 were sentenced to imprisonment. While the sentences removed many prominent anarchist leaders from further activities, allegations of forced confessions and torture of defendants radicalized other anarchists throughout Spain. In August 1897, Spanish Prime Minister Antonio Cánovas del Castillo was assassinated by anarchist Michele Angiolillo for his role in the Montjuïc trials.

Anarchist sentiment hardened in Barcelona, and 13 years after the Corpus Christi bombing, Barcelona workers staged a general strike in 1909 that was violently suppressed. Later, during the Spanish Civil War, Barcelona was the center of anarchist controlled Catalonia.
