= Under Three Flags =

2005 book by Benedict Anderson

- Author: Benedict Anderson
- Subject: History
- Publisher: Verso Books
- Publication date: 2005
- Pages: 255
- ISBN: 1844670376

Under Three Flags: Anarchism and the Anti-Colonial Imagination is a 2005 book by Benedict Anderson on the intersection of Philippine nationalism and late 19th century anarchism.

It was later republished as The Age of Globalization: Anarchists and the Anti-Colonial Imagination.

== Reception ==
Writing in the Journal of the Royal Asiatic Society, Raquel A. G. Reyes described the book as an attempt "to trace the impact and influence of anarchism on anti-colonial nationalism". Reyes praised Anderson for removing the Cuban and Philippine revolutions "from their provicial moorings and often parochial historical interpretations" by instead situating them as "very much part of changing global conditions". Reyes suggested that Anderson's "case for anarchism" in the book is "based on circumstantial evidence", and Reyes found his argument regarding the Philippines to be "largely unconvincing".

Patricio N. Abinales, in a review for the International Review of Social History, said that the book may be "read as a dirge to the passing of these two political forces which may never claim the moral and political high ground again". Abinales saw "subtle ammendments to Imagined Communities" in Under Three Flags, suggesting that while Imagined Communities "used homogenous empty time to answer the question of how people began to imagine themselves as members of an embryonic nation", Under Three Flags instead "treats it more broadly". Abinales described Anderson's chapter about José Rizal's El Filibusterismo as "a brilliant treatise on the Philippine national hero's second and much darker novel".

Koichi Hagimoto, reviewing the book for A Contracorriente: una revista de estudios latinoamericanos, wrote that Anderson "provides a comprehensive study of world politics and cultural identities in relation to the birth of Philippine nationalism during the 19th century". Hagimoto summarised that Anderson "attempts to recover the dynamic yet often overlooked relationship between the international anarchist movement of the nineteenth century (above all in Spain, France, and Italy) and nascent Philippine nationalism". Hagimoto suggested that the book facilitates attention to the dual colonisation of Cuba and the Philippines in the late 19th century, something that Hagimoto felt is "often disregarded in the filed of Hispanic literary and cultural studies".

== See also ==
- Katipunan
- Anarchism in the Philippines

== Bibliography ==
- Abinales, Patricio N. (2006). "Review of Under Three Flags. Anarchism and the Anti-Colonial Imagination". International Review of Social History. 51 (3): 499–501. doi:10.1017/S0020859006072701. ISSN 0020-8590. JSTOR 44582976. S2CID 145624940.
- Amrith, Sunil S. (2008). Anderson, Benedict (ed.). "Gazing at the Stars". History Workshop Journal. 66 (66): 227–236. doi:10.1093/hwj/dbn030. ISSN 1363-3554. JSTOR 25473017.
- Bankoff, Greg (2007). "Review of Under three flags; Anarchism and the anticolonial imagination". Bijdragen tot de Taal-, Land- en Volkenkunde. 163 (4): 559–561. ISSN 0006-2294. JSTOR 27868417.
- Beckman, Jonathan (December 30, 2007). "Under Three Flags by Benedict Anderson". The Observer. ISSN 0029-7712.
- Berger, Mark T. (2007). "Review of Under Three Flags: Anarchism and the Anti-Colonial Imagination". The Journal of Pacific History. 42 (1): 129–130. ISSN 0022-3344. JSTOR 40346585.
- Craib, Raymond B. (2008). "Resena de Under Three Flags: Anarchism and the Anti-Colonial Imagination". Investigaciones Geográficas (in Spanish) (66): 153–155.
- Daniel, Evan Matthew (2007). "Review of Under Three Flags: Anarchism and the Anti-Colonial Imagination". Journal for the Study of Radicalism. 1 (1): 137–141. doi:10.1353/jsr.2008.0017. ISSN 1930-1189. JSTOR 41887571. S2CID 144804919.
- Pattieu, Sylvain (2008). "Review of Under Three Flags: Anarchism and the Anti-Colonial Imagination". Annales. Histoire, Sciences Sociales (in French). 63 (3): 675–676. doi:10.1017/S0395264900023507. ISSN 0395-2649. JSTOR 40376682. S2CID 166446533.
- Reyes, Raquel A. G. (2006). "Review of Under Three Flags: Anarchism and the Anti-Colonial Imagination" (PDF). Journal of the Royal Asiatic Society. 16 (3): 339–341. doi:10.1017/S135618630637647X. ISSN 1356-1863. JSTOR 25188666. S2CID 162753275.
- Richardson, Jim (2006). "Academic anarchy". Journal of Contemporary Asia. 36 (4): 532–544. doi:10.1080/00472330680000331. ISSN 0047-2336. S2CID 216138789 – via Taylor & Francis.
- Shipper, Apichai W. (2016). Scott, James C.; Anderson, Benedict; Hirsch, Steven; van der Walt, Lucien; Ford, Michele (eds.). "Anarchist Discourse in Asian Studies". Pacific Affairs. 89 (1): 103–111. doi:10.5509/2016891103. ISSN 0030-851X. JSTOR 24779267.
- van Bijlert, Victor (2007). "Review of Under Three Flags: Anarchism and the Anti-Colonial Imagination". Journal of the Economic and Social History of the Orient. 50 (4): 569–571. doi:10.1163/156852007783245089. ISSN 0022-4995. JSTOR 25165211.
