= Hijos del Pueblo =

1885 song

"Hijos del pueblo" is a Spanish song originating from the labor movement, primarily inspired by anarcho-syndicalism. Allegedly, this song was made by a journalist from Alicante, Rafael Carratalá Ramos. It was shared with the public in 1885 for the "Revolutionary Music" section of the first socialist meeting organised by the 'Centre d'Amics' in Reus, belonging to the First International.

== Versions ==
The song has three sets of lyrics, as it was sung popularly, even some versions may differ. The first known version is the original one from 1885, focused on organising for labour rights. The second was recorded during the Spanish Civil War by the Orfeó Català under the direction of Francisco Pujol, with the focus shifted towards antifascism. The third is a version named "Himno anarquista" (Anarchist Anthem) or "Salud proletarios" (Long Live the Proletariat).

=== Version for the centenary of the CNT ===
To celebrate the centenary of the CNT, it was proposed to make a cover with modern sound equipment of "A las barricadas" and "Hijos del pueblo". To get the score, the Fundación de Estudios Libertarios Anselmo Lorenzo was contacted with hopes that the sheets were in their archives. However they were informed that even if they existed, they would be untraceable, probably lost or destroyed after the end of the Civil War. Afterwards, the CNT contacted the newspaper Tierra y Libertad, discovering that they in fact had the music. After months of work composing, writing, gathering musicians and singers, on November 14, 2009, the recording took place in the Conservatorio de Música Juan Crisóstomo de Arriaga, in Bilbao, organised by Luís Antonio Gamarra.

== Lyrics ==
Hijos del pueblo (instrumental)

Lyrics
Hijos del pueblo (1885)	English translation
Hijo del pueblo, te oprimen cadenas, y esa injusticia no puede seguir; si tu existencia es un mundo de penas, antes que esclavo prefiere morir. Esos burgueses, asaz egoístas, que así desprecian la Humanidad; serán barridos por los anarquistas al fuerte grito de libertad.	Son of the people, chains oppress you, and that injustice cannot keep going; if your existence is a world of sorrow, death would be preferable before becoming a slave. These bourgeoisie, way too selfish, they despise the world, They will be swept away by the anarchists, To the strong shout of freedom!
Rojo pendón, no más sufrir, la explotación ha de sucumbir. Levántate, pueblo leal, al grito de revolución social. Vindicación no hay que pedir; sólo la unión la podrá exigir. Nuestro pavés no romperás. Torpe burgués. ¡Atrás! ¡Atrás!	Under the red banner, no more suffering, exploitation will fall. Stand up, loyal people, to the shout of social revolution. Vindication does not need to be asked for; only unity will grant it. Our pavise you will not shatter. You bumbling bourgeois ¡Run Away! ¡Run Away!
Los corazones obreros que laten por nuestra causa, felices serán. Si entusiasmados y unidos combaten, de la victoria, la palma obtendrán. Los proletarios a la burguesía han de tratarla con altivez, y combatirla también a porfía por su malvada estupidez.	The workers heart beating for our cause, will be happy. If thrilled and united they fight, victory will come nigh! The proletariat to the bourgeoisie has to treat them with haughtiness and fight it with insistence for their evil foolishness.
Rojo pendón, no más sufrir, la explotación ha de sucumbir. Levántate, pueblo leal, al grito de revolución social. Vindicación no hay que pedir; sólo la unión la podrá exigir. Nuestro pavés no romperás. Torpe burgués. ¡Atrás! ¡Atrás!	Under the red banner, no more suffering, exploitation will fall. Stand up, loyal people, to the shout of social revolution. Vindication does not need to be asked for; only unity will grant it. Our pavise will not shatter. You bumbling bourgeois ¡Run Away! ¡Run Away!

Lyrics
Guerra Civil 1936	English translation
Hijo del pueblo, te oprimen cadenas, y esa injusticia no puede seguir; si tu existencia es un mundo de penas antes que esclavo prefiere morir. En la batalla, la hiena fascista. por nuestro esfuerzo sucumbirá; y el pueblo entero, con los anarquistas, hará que triunfe la libertad.	Son of the people, chains oppress you, and that injustice cannot keep going; if your existence is a world of sorrow, death would be preferable before becoming a slave. In the battle, the fascist hyena, by our effort it shall succumb, and our whole people, with the anarchists, will make freedom triumph.
Trabajador, no más sufrir, el opresor ha de sucumbir. Levántate, pueblo leal, al grito de revolución social. Fuerte unidad de fe y de acción producirá la revolución. Nuestro pendón uno ha de ser: sólo en la unión está el vencer.	Worker, no more suffering, the oppressor has to succumb. Stand up, loyal people, to the shout of social revolution. Strong unity of faith and action will produce the revolution. Our banner has to be: only in union is the victory.

Lyrics
Himno anarquista (Salud proletarios)	English translation
Salud proletarios: Llegó el gran día; dejemos los antros de la explotación, no ser más esclavos de la burguesía, dejemos suspensa la producción. Iguales derechos e iguales deberes tenga por norma la sociedad, y sobre la tierra los humanos seres vivan felices en fraternidad.	Long live the proletariat: The great day is here; let's leave behind the sweatshops of exploitation, no more being slaves to the bourgeoisie, let's leave on hold their production. Equal rights and equal duties shall be rules our society lives by, and on the Earth, may humans live in happiness and fraternity
Trabajador, no más sufrir el opresor ha de sucumbir. A derrocar al capital, al grito de Revolución Social. Acracia al fin triunfará. Bello jardín la tierra será. Todo lo vil a eliminar. Pueblo viril, ¡Luchar, Luchar!	Worker, no more suffering, the oppressor has to succumb. Let's go to coup the capital, to the cry Social Revolution; Acracy shall finally triumph Beautiful garden shall the Earth be. Everything vile to eliminate Virile people, Fight! Fight!
No más supremacía de dioses y leyes, no más de tiranos la vil opresión. Y vallas, fronteras, gobiernos y leyes derrúmbense al paso de la rebelión. Formemos un mundo de paz y armonía donde libres imperen las Artes y Amor. Viviendo la libre Anarquía; Natura brinda en su rica labor.	No more supremacy of Gods and laws, no more vile oppression from tyrants. And fences, borders, governments and laws shall all crumble beneath the march of rebellion. Let's create a world of peace and harmony where Love and Art can rule freely! Living the free anarchy while Nature toasts in her rich labour.
Trabajador, no más sufrir el opresor ha de sucumbir. A derrocar al capital, al grito de Revolución Social. Acracia al fin triunfará. Bello jardín la tierra será. Todo lo vil a eliminar. Pueblo viril, ¡Luchar, Luchar!	Worker, no more suffering, the oppressor has to succumb. Let's go to coup the capital, to the cry Social Revolution; Acracy shall finally triumph Beautiful garden shall the Earth be. Everything vile to eliminate Virile people, Fight! Fight!

== Related ==
- A las barricadas
