= Montjuïc trial =

1896–1897 Spanish trial of anarchists

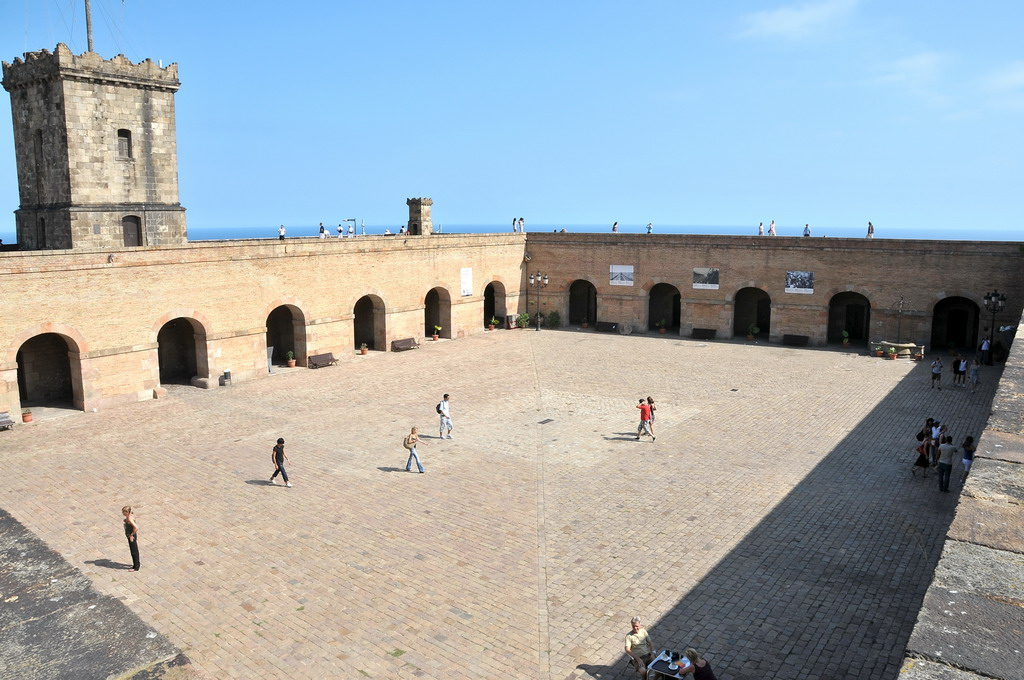
View inside the Montjuïc Castle

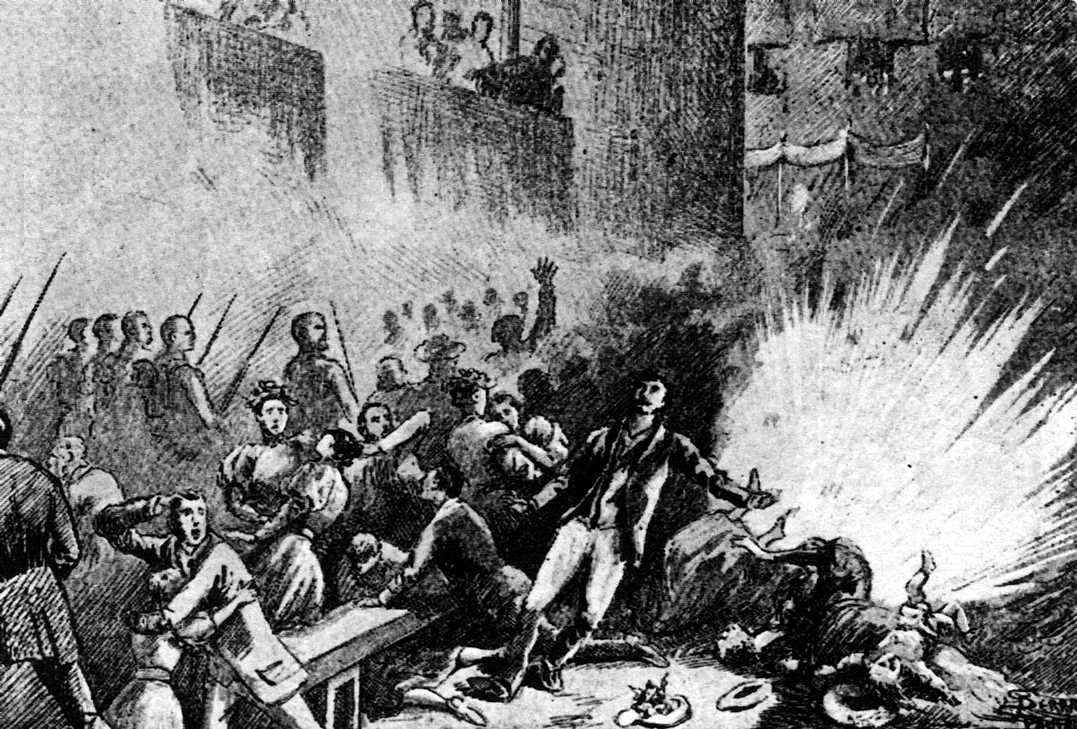
Illustration of the Corpus Christi attack

The Montjuïc trial was a trial of anarchist suspects in the military Montjuïc Castle following the 1896 attack on the Barcelonean Corpus Christi procession. About 400 suspects were arrested, from whom 87 were put on trial and five executed. Stories of forced confessions through torture led to an 1898–1899 campaign for a judicial review of the trial organized through Alejandro Lerroux and his newspaper El Progreso. Republican support for Lerroux from this action led to his rise as a left-wing force in Barcelona.

Following the bombing, Spanish Prime Minister Antonio Cánovas del Castillo ordered mass arrests of Barcelonan workers. During this period, "Montjuïc" became synonymous with barbarous torture based on the treatment of anarchists and other prisoners there. The suspects were held without water or food. They were given salted cod to exacerbate their thirst. The suspects were stripped and, instead of sleeping, were made to march in their cells while holding leg weights. Those who collapsed were waked with burns from hot irons. Suspects had their toenails pulled, genitals and feet crushed, and craniums put into compression devices. They were electrocuted. Guards extinguished cigars on their bodies. Among the arrested there were also women, such as Teresa Claramunt, who, besides the tortures, reported the humiliating treatment that female prisoners received and their blackmailing by the guards to provide them with sexual favors.

Though the bomber had fled the country, Cánovas had dozens of confessions by December. The prosecutor requested 28 death sentences and 59 life sentences. The military tribunal rejected all but five death sentences, which were fulfilled on May 4, 1897. An additional 20 suspects received prison sentences. The remaining 63 suspects were exonerated and deported elsewhere in Europe.

== Response and legacy ==
The Spanish government lost international goodwill as news of its state-sponsored torture spread. The dispersed deportees, amplified by the international press, became celebrities as the living proof of the "crimes of Montjuïc". Deportees bared their scars before appalled meeting halls in the United Kingdom and United States. The Montjuïc-deported anarchist Fernando Tarrida del Mármol's Les inquisiteurs d’Espagne (Montjuich, Cuba, Philippines) influentially brought the Montjuïc events to a wider audience. This international pressure exacerbated the pressure which the Spanish government already felt in response to its treatment of Cuban civilians.

Cuban independence advocates used international disgust with Spanish barbarism to unite disparate groups. Cuban bourgeois separatists and anarchists put aside disagreements to organize against the Spanish military and government. Cuban revolutionaries in Europe housed Montjuïc deportees. In Paris, Puerto Rico and Cuba independence advocate Ramón Emeterio Betances led a campaign against Spanish backwardness. In London, Cuban advocates held a mass meeting in Hyde Park and a British anarchist "Spanish Atrocities Committee" held a large demonstration in Trafalgar Square in May 1897. The American public was more roiled by the Spanish atrocities than by the domestic 1886 Haymarket affair. Anarchist and feminist Voltairine de Cleyre's pamphlet The Modern Inquisition in Spain sold through its printing. American anarchists demonstrated outside the Spanish embassy in New York.

Anarchist Michele Angiolillo assassinated Prime Minister Cánovas in retaliation for his role in the trial and its executions.

== See also ==
- Liceu bombing, an attack earlier in the decade that ended with laborers tortured in Montjuïc

== Bibliography ==
- Tone, John Lawrence (2006). "The Monster and the Assassin". War and Genocide in Cuba, 1895–1898. The University of North Carolina Press. pp. 225–238. ISBN 978-0-8078-3006-2.
