= Pact of Union and Solidarity =

Spanish trade union federation

- Pacto de Unión y Solidaridad
- Abbreviation: PUS
- Predecessor: Federation of Workers of the Spanish Region
- Successor: Federation of Workers' Societies of the Spanish Region
- Established: 19 May 1888; 138 years ago
- Dissolved: 1896; 130 years ago
- Type: National trade union federation
- Headquarters: Alcoi
- Location: Spain

The Pact of Union and Solidarity (Spanish: Pacto de Unión y Solidaridad; PUS), also known as the Federation of Resistance to Capital (Spanish: Federación de Resistencia al Capital; FRC), was a Spanish trade union federation that operated during the 1890s. Founded by Catalan collectivists and syndicalists within the existing Federation of Workers of the Spanish Region (FTRE), the PUS sought to unify trade unions around demands for the eight-hour day. It was a more decentralised organisation than the FTRE and permitted workers of all socialist schools of thought. Together with the Anarchist Organisation of the Spanish Region (OARE), in 1888, the PUS voted to dissolve the FTRE. It briefly continued organising as an independent trade union federation, but after a rise in anarchist terrorism provoked political repression by the Spanish state, its activities were limited. By 1893, it had largely stopped functioning. Following the arrest of hundreds of anarchists in the Montjuïc trial, it finally dissolved itself in 1896. After a resurgence in trade union activity, it was succeeded by the Federation of Workers' Societies of the Spanish Region (FSORE) in 1900.

== Background ==
Following the Restoration of the Spanish monarchy in the late 1870s, the prime minister Antonio Cánovas del Castillo oversaw the creation of the turno system, in which power would alternate between the Liberal and Conservative parties. This created a period of political stability and economic growth, although the system lacked any substantial public participation in politics. The growth of artisanal industries in Catalonia and the mining industry in Asturias led to a growth in the strength of the working class, which increasingly sought improvements to their living and working conditions. Activists of the Federation of Workers of the Spanish Region (FTRE) organised demonstrations, rallies and meetings to promote the demand for the eight-hour day, with many coalescing into an Eight-Hour Interim Committee (Spanish: Comisión interina de las ocho horas).

By the late 1880s, the growing anarchist movement was facing increased political repression, which led to the deterioration of the FTRE, the main national trade union federation of the period. By 1887, its only regional federations that had been able to sustain their membership numbers were those in Catalonia and Valencia, where political repression had been less intense than it had been in its historic support bases in Andalusia, Murcia and New Castile. The FTRE continued to hold its national congress in the hope of reviving the organisation, but its May 1887 congress in Madrid was poorly-attended and its main proposals were either rejected or deferred. Factional disputes also broke out between the collectivist majority and communist minority of the FTRE, particularly over the collectivist proposal of distributing resources "to each according to their contribution".

== Establishment ==
By 1885, the Catalan regional federation of the FTRE, which was dominated by syndicalists, had become effectively independent from the national organisation and ran its own autonomous network of trade unions (also known as "resistance societies"). Over the summer of 1887, the Catalan branch of the FTRE held a number of conferences to discuss the establishment of a formal alliance with other Catalan trade unions. By the time of the FTRE's Barcelona Congress, held between 19 and 21 May 1888, the Catalan federation had already agreed to establish the Pact of Union and Solidarity (Spanish: Pacto de Unión y Solidaridad; PUS), also known as the Federation of Resistance to Capital (Spanish: Federación de Resistencia al Capital; FRC). As the majority of congressional delegates were from the PUS, the resolution on its establishment was passed and it was able to immediately begin its operations.

The PUS aimed to unite the working class into trade unions, in order to take collective action against capitalism. The trade unions of the PUS were organised together into local federations, without any hierarchy or restrictions on membership. Although the PUS was predominantly made up of collectivist anarchists, the organisation consciously avoided using any ideological labels, hoping to pre-empt any political sectarianism which they believed would prevent them from taking action. The PUS was thus open to workers of any socialist school of thought, including Marxists and reformists, who the anarchists hoped to absorb into their ranks. By engaing in political moderation, the PUS hoped to unite as much of the working class as possible under its banner.

The PUS sought to unite trade unions behind specific actions, including demands for the eight-hour day and the organisation of political demonstrations on International Workers' Day. Each trade union would engage in daily agitation efforts to defend the interests of their members and demand improvements to working conditions. These trade unions were bound together by a "free pact" (Spanish: libre pacto), which required them to provide mutual aid to each other in the event of a strike action. Unlike the FTRE, the PUS allowed workers of different trades to join the same local federation. The administration of the PUS was overseen from the organisation's headquarters in Alcoi by an executive commission, consisting of five members elected by popular assembly, which collected statistics and handled internal communications.

== Split with the FTRE ==
Many Spanish anarchists, including the collectivist Ricardo Mella, immediately objected to the establishment of the PUS, which they considered a threat to the unity of the anarchist movement. From Seville, Mella launched the collectivist newspaper La Solidaridad, in which he staunchly criticised the PUS for undermining the collectivist movement. Mella alleged that the PUS, contrary its claim of openness to all political tendencies, was actually an exclusively communist organisation and that it had abandoned the collectivist organisational model. He warned that it would become an organisation "made up of fanatics, mystics, and men who are neither free nor genuinely revolutionary". Spanish communists themselves, who were already levelling criticisms against the centralised structure of the FTRE, supported the establishment of the relatively decentralised PUS, although they also planned on creating a specifically communist organisation.

In September 1888, the Federal Commission of the FTRE convened a final congress in Valencia, where a majority of delegates voted to dissolve the organisation. Its remaining members split into two organisations: the PUS, which focused on trade union organising; and the Anarchist Organisation of the Spanish Region (OARE), a specifically anarchist political organisation based on a loose network of affinity groups. Both groups welcomed the dissolution of the FTRE, which they hoped would promote the decentralisation of the Spanish anarchist movement. But the PUS had a number of ideological and tactical disagreements with the communists of the OARE, who favoured acts of terrorism over trade union organising. Ricardo Mella had hoped that the dissolution of the FTRE would lead to the creation of a broad revolutionary alliance, which would include workers of every school of thought, but this never came to fruition. The splintering of the FTRE ultimately solidified the rise of anarchist communism as the dominant anarchist school of thought in Spain.

Over the course of the late 1880s and early 1890s, the PUS oversaw the revival of the Spanish labour movement. In December 1889, the PUS held its first national meeting; and in March 1891, the PUS held its first congress in Madrid, which was attended by both socialist and anarchist delegates. The PUS was primarily led by Catalan collectivists and syndicalists, although it had smaller branches in Andalusia and Valencia. In Andalusia, rural workers used the PUS to form an alliance between the working poor and unemployed, uniting them behind political demonstrations, boycotts and strike actions. In May 1893, Catalan agricultural workers established the Agricultural Union of the Free Pact (Catalan: Unió Agrícola del Pacte Lliure; UAPL), which affiliated itself with the PUS. The PUS never became as influential as the FTRE.

== Suppression ==
On 1 May 1891, the PUS called a general strike in Barcelona to demand the eight-hour day. The strike began with a rally at the Teatre Tívoli, before the workers marched down La Rambla towards the residency of the Civil Governor of Barcelona. Factories were shut down and workers clashed with the municipal police in the streets, prompting the government to declare martial law in Barcelona. On 2 May, a bomb was detonated outside the building of the Foment del Treball Nacional, the Catalan employers' association. This would be the first of a string of bomb attacks that would take place in Spain over the course of the 1890s.

The Spanish state revived the Mano Negra conspiracy theory and initiated a wave of political repression against the anarchist movement, culminating in the Jerez uprising of January 1892. Many anarchists were radicalised by the affair and turned towards violence. In September 1893, Paulí Pallàs attempted to assassinate the Captain General of Catalonia, Arsenio Martínez Campos. A month later, Santiago Salvador carried out the Liceu bombing, which killed 22 people and wounded dozens more. By this time, the PUS had already become effectively defunct.

In 1896, anarchists allegedly carried out the Corpus Christi procession bombing, which killed 11 people. Hundreds of anarchists were indiscriminately arrested, imprisoned and tortured in the subsequent Montjuïc trials, provoking the Italian anarchist Michele Angiolillo to carry out the assassination of Antonio Cánovas del Castillo. The wave of terrorism and political repression during the 1890s forced many leading anarchists to go into exile. Facing intense political repression, the PUS formally dissolved in 1896. This effectively broke the anarchist movement's ties to the organised labour movement.

== Legacy ==
Over the subsequent years, an economic decline in Catalonia led to the revival of the trade union movement under the banner of anarcho-syndicalism. In 1900, a coalition of trade unions, including many from the PUS who had managed to survive the repression of the 1890s, established the Federation of Workers' Societies of the Spanish Region (FSORE). The FSORE was in turn succeeded by the trade union federation Workers' Solidarity (SO) in 1907, and then by the National Confederation of Labour (CNT) in 1910. Like the PUS before it, the CNT initially presented itself as ideologically neutral, although over the years it developed into an explicitly anarchist organisation.

== Bibliography ==
- Arnabat, Ramon; Duch, Montserrat; Gavaldà, Antoni (2022). "The Catalan peasantry: Sociability, politicisation, mobilisation and citizenship (1870-1939)". Catalan Historical Review (15): 53–68. doi:10.2436/20.1000.01.187. ISSN 2013-407X.
- Baer, James A. (2015). Anarchist Immigrants in Spain and Argentina. University of Illinois Press. ISBN 978-0-252-03899-0.
- Bookchin, Murray (1978). The Spanish Anarchists: The Heroic Years 1868–1936. Harper & Row. ISBN 0-06-090607-3.
- Esenwein, George Richard (1989). "The Demise of the FTRE and the Emergence of Anarchist Associational Life". Anarchist Ideology and the Working-class Movement in Spain, 1868-1898. University of California Press. pp. 117–133. ISBN 978-0520063983.
- Garner, Jason (2016). Goals and Means: Anarchism, Syndicalism, and Internationalism in the Origins of the Federación Anarquista Ibérica. AK Press. ISBN 9781849352260.
- Kaplan, Temma (1977). Anarchists of Andalusia, 1868-1903. Princeton University Press. ISBN 9781400869718.
- Romanos, Eduardo; Ledesma, José Luis (2016). "May Day in Spain: Socialist and Anarchist Traditions". In Peterson, Abby; Reiter, Herbert (eds.). The Ritual of May Day in Western Europe: Past, Present and Future. Routledge. doi:10.4324/9781315553344-5 (inactive 1 July 2025). ISBN 9781315553344.
- Romero Salvadó, Francisco J. (2024). "The Restoration Monarchy, 1874-1914: The Fading Charm of a Political Comedy". Modern Spain: Politics and Society since 1874. Bloomsbury Academic. pp. 1–48. ISBN 978-1-3504-5518-4.
- Yeoman, James Michael (2020). "Introduction". Print Culture and the Formation of the Anarchist Movement in Spain, 1890-1915. Routledge. pp. 1–39. ISBN 978-0-367-40797-1.
