= Anarchist Organization of the Spanish Region =

Spanish anarchist organization

- Organización Anarquista de la Región Española
- Abbreviation: OARE
- Predecessor: Federation of Workers of the Spanish Region
- Established: September 1888; 138 years ago
- Founded at: Valencia
- Dissolved: c. 1890; 136 years ago
- Type: Political organisation
- Location: Spain

The Anarchist Organization of the Spanish Region (Spanish: Organización Anarquista de la Región Española; OARE) was a Spanish anarchist political organization formed by a loose network of affinity groups. Established in September 1888, following the dissolution of the Federation of Workers of the Spanish Region (FTRE), the OARE acted as the political counterpart to the Pact of Union and Solidarity (PUS), itself a trade union center. The OARE gained support at tertulias, where its members attempt to win converts to anarchism and agitated for violent action. It was a highly decentralized organization and permitted members of all anarchist schools of thought, although anarchist communism was the predominant tendency. The OARE was short-lived, as it was rendered defunct following the rise of anarchist terrorism in Spain during the 1890s. Its anarchist communist theories continued to be upheld by the Tierra y Libertad newspaper, while its affinity group structure provided a precursor to the later Iberian Anarchist Federation (FAI).

== Background ==
By the late 1880s, the growing anarchist movement was facing increased political repression, which led to the deterioration of the Federation of Workers of the Spanish Region (FTRE), the main national trade union federation of the period. By 1887, its only regional federations that had been able to sustain their membership numbers were those in Catalonia and Valencia, where political repression had been less intense than it had been in its historic support bases in Andalusia, Murcia and New Castile. The FTRE continued to hold its national congress in the hope of reviving the organisation, but its May 1887 congress in Madrid was poorly-attended and its main proposals were either rejected or deferred. Factional disputes also broke out between the collectivist majority and communist minority of the FTRE, particularly over the collectivist proposal of distributing resources "to each according to their contribution". By this time, the Catalan regional federation of the FTRE, which was dominated by syndicalists, had become effectively independent from the national organisation and ran its own autonomous network of trade unions. Over the summer of 1887, the Catalan branch of the FTRE held a number of conferences to discuss the establishment of a formal alliance with other Catalan trade unions. By the time of the FTRE's Barcelona Congress, held in May 1888, the Catalan federation had already agreed to establish the Pact of Union and Solidarity (Spanish: Pacto de Unión y Solidaridad; PUS). As a new trade union federation, the PUS effectively took over the economic functions of the near-defunct FTRE.

== Establishment ==
In September 1888, the remaining federations of the FTRE were called together for a congress in Valencia, where a majority of delegates voted to dissolve the FTRE. As a successor to the political body of the FTRE, the majority of delegates at the Valencia congress elected to form a specifically anarchist political organization: the Anarchist Organization of the Spanish Region (Spanish: Organización Anarquista de la Región Española; OARE). This move was spearheaded by anarchist groups who had objected to the FTRE's alliance with trade unions, which they believed to have inherently reformist tendencies. Although the relationship between the two new organizations was never explicitly stated at the congress, it was generally understood by the members of the nascent OARE that their role would be to influence the path of the PUS towards revolutionary goals. They aimed to strengthen the "organic bond" (Spanish: trabazón) between the two organizations, in order to accelerate the realization of anarchism. The Valencia Congress also marked the decline of collectivist anarchism and the rise of anarchist communism as the predominant anarchist ideology in Spain, resulting in the decentralization of the anarchist movement away from a single collectivist organization. Nevertheless, the dissolution of the FTRE was criticised by French anarchist communists of the newspaper Le Révolté, who complained that there had not been any break with the past due to the replacement of the FTRE with two similar organizations.

== Organization and ideology ==
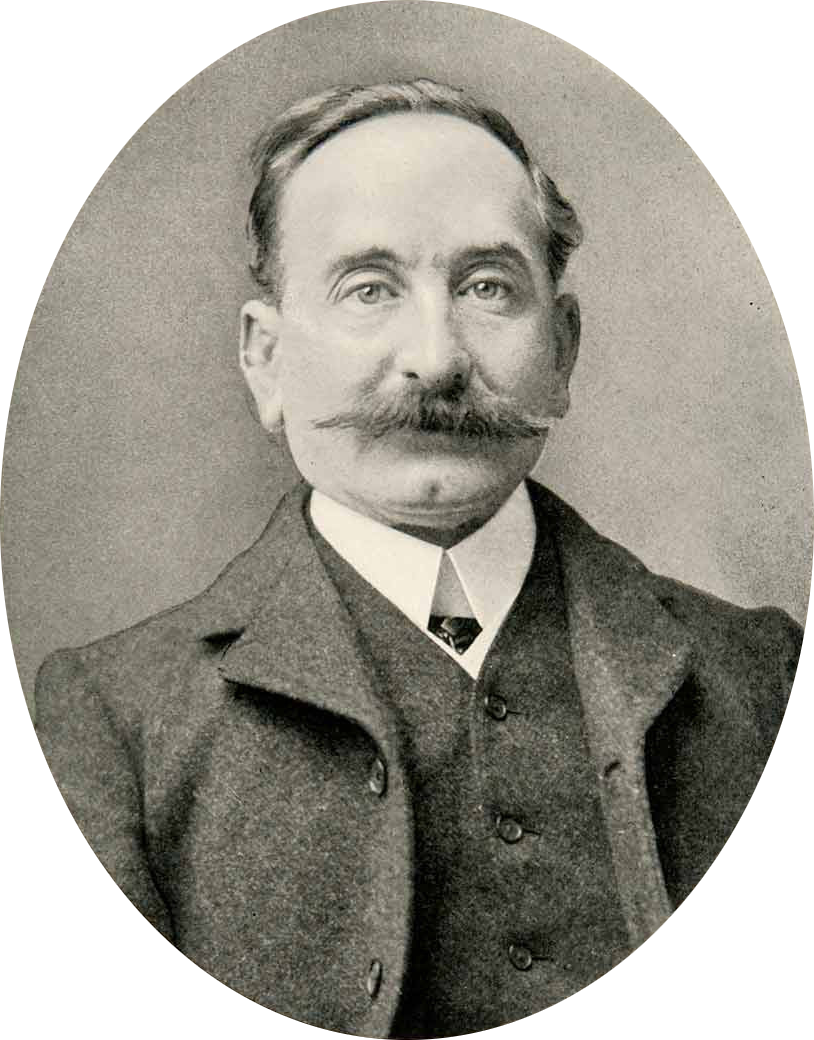
Fernando Tarrida del Mármol, who praised the OARE for its non-sectarian structure

The OARE was constituted by a loose federation of anarchist affinity groups, many of which had been formed spontaneously over the previous two decades. In each affinity group, there was no hierarchy and each member took on certain specific roles, and they met on a weekly or fortnightly basis. These groups largely acted independently and lacked a coherent overarching programme. The main base of support for the OARE was found in the tertulias, held in the cafés of Barcelona, where groups of Spanish anarchist men socialized and held discussions about their ideas. At these tertulias, they gained support from writers and artists of Spanish intellectual society, who were inspired by the anarchists' invocations of violent action as a means to break from the stagnation of modern Spain. The affinity groups of the OARE mostly limited themselves to propaganda activities and attempting to convert people to anarchism; the majority of them did not actively engage in terrorist activity.

The central administrative body of the OARE was its Relations and Statistics Centre (Spanish: Centro de Relaciónes y Estadísticas), which acted solely as an intermediary between the organization's various affinity groups, providing them with information but holding no executive powers of its own. It was conceived explicitly as having a more limited function that the administration of the FTRE. Through this national commission, the groups were able to cut down on communication expenses and provide assistance to each other when one or more were subjected to political repression. Although the OARE allowed these groups to maintain contact, the organization's main objective was to take action among the working classes and increase the influence of anarchism among them, in direct competition with the Spanish Socialist Workers' Party (PSOE) and Radical Republican Party (PRR).

Membership of the OARE was open to anarchists of all schools of thought, although it would largely be communist in orientation. The Cuban anarchist Fernando Tarrida del Mármol cited the OARE as an example of organizing irrespective of political disagreements, which aligned with his principle of anarchism without adjectives. Many members of the OARE were influenced by individualist anarchism and the works of Peter Kropotkin, which emphasised education and neglected organization. They also advocated for violent action, which they saw as necessary to break from the stagnation of Spanish society.

== Legacy ==
By the 1890s, Spanish anarchists were advocating for a variety of "propaganda of the deed", which called for individual acts of anarchist terrorism to mobilize the masses towards revolutionary action. The final decade of the 19th century saw a marked increase in anarchist violence, which exacerbated internal divisions within the anarchist movement. In response to the resurgent anarchist movement, the Spanish authorities revived the old conspiracy theory of the "Black Hand". Conflicts between anarchist activists and the state culminated in the Jerez uprising of 1892, which was ended when the Civil Guard publicly executed several Andalusian anarchists by garrote. In revenge for the repression of the uprising, the Catalan anarchist Paulí Pallàs attempted to assassinate the Captain General of Catalonia, Arsenio Martínez Campos, for which he was executed. Anarchist violence continued to escalate, with Santiago Salvador killing more than 20 people in the 1893 Liceu bombing and anarchists killing 11 people in the 1896 Barcelona Corpus Christi procession bombing. In the subsequent Montjuïc trials, hundreds of anarchists were arrested and tortured under suspicion of involvement in the attacks. In revenge for the repression, Italian anarchist Michele Angiolillo assassinated the Spanish prime minister, Antonio Cánovas del Castillo, in 1897.

The continuous wave of violence and repression forced many Spanish anarchists to flee into exile, with many finding refuge in the Americas. By the end of the 19th century, the Spanish anarchist movement had effectively been repressed; many workers left the OARE en masse, rendering the organization effectively defunct. At the turn of the 20th century, anarchists largely abandoned the terrorist methods of "propaganda of the deed" and began to consider other methods for taking direct action. The Spanish anarchist movement largely moved away from anarchist communism towards anarcho-syndicalism, with only a small group of purists holding onto the old anarchist communist doctrine of the 1890s. The anarchist communist doctrine of the OARE was preserved by the Tierra y Libertad newspaper, edited by the anti-syndicalists Juan Basón and Francisco Cardenal, and the Grupo 4 de Mayo, which upheld anarchist terrorism. According to Spanish historian José Álvarez Junco, the OARE also acted as a precursor to the Iberian Anarchist Federation (FAI).

== Bibliography ==
- Baer, James A. (2015). Anarchist Immigrants in Spain and Argentina. University of Illinois Press. ISBN 978-0-252-03899-0.
- Bookchin, Murray (1978). The Spanish Anarchists: The Heroic Years 1868–1936. Harper & Row. ISBN 0-06-090607-3.
- Esenwein, George Richard (1989). "The Demise of the FTRE and the Emergence of Anarchist Associational Life". Anarchist Ideology and the Working-class Movement in Spain, 1868-1898. University of California Press. pp. 117–133. ISBN 978-0520063983.
- Garner, Jason (2016). Goals and Means: Anarchism, Syndicalism, and Internationalism in the Origins of the Federación Anarquista Ibérica. AK Press. ISBN 9781849352260.
- Kaplan, Temma (1977). Anarchists of Andalusia, 1868-1903. Princeton University Press. ISBN 9781400869718.
