= Antonio García Birlán =

Andalusian journalist, publisher and politician (1891–1984)

Minister of Health and Social Assistance of Catalonia
- In office 26 September – 17 December 1936
- President: Lluís Companys
- Prime Minister: Josep Tarradellas
- Preceded by: Martí Rouret i Callol
- Succeeded by: Pedro Herrera Camarero

Personal details
- Born: 27 March 1892 Pinos Puente, Granada, Andalusia, Spain
- Died: 20 June 1984 (aged 92) Barcelona, Catalonia, Spain
- Party: Iberian Anarchist Federation
- Occupation: Journalist, publisher, teacher

Antonio García Birlán was an Andalusian journalist, publisher and politician. He became interested in philosophy from an early age, and by the time he was an adult, he had joined the anarchist movement as a writer for Tierra y Libertad. He wrote for a series of anarchist publications throughout the 1910s and 1920s, before going on to join the National Confederation of Labour (CNT) and the Iberian Anarchist Federation (FAI). During the Spanish Revolution of 1936, he served as the Catalan Minister of Health and worked for several government ministries under the leadership of fellow anarchist activists. At the end of the Spanish Civil War, he fled into exile and continued his publishing efforts, culminating in the publication of a series of anthologies following his return to Spain after the Spanish transition to democracy.

== Biography ==
=== Early life and career ===
Antonio García Birlán was born on 27 March 1892, in the Andalusian city of Pinos Puente. He was largely self-taught and took classes with Federico García Lorca, before going on to work as a carpenter and day labourer. In 1907, he came into contact with anarchism and began travelling to Granada on his days off to read about philosophy, taking a keen interest in the works of Søren Kierkegaard, Friedrich Nietzsche and Leo Tolstoy, among many others. During the early 1910s, he expressed support for the Mexican Revolution and began writing articles for the anarchist newspaper Liberación de Elche. In late 1912, he took a trip around the province of Córdoba and visited a rationalist school, which he wrote about for Tierra y Libertad. The following year, he wrote articles for Germinal de Tarrasa and Cultura Libertaria de Ferrol, and briefly worked as a teacher at a school in Castro del Río.

=== Writing and political activism ===
In June 1914, he travelled to Barcelona and met the anarchist theorist Anselmo Lorenzo. He then moved to Asquerosa, where he wrote for Tierra y Libertad about the living conditions of the peasantry and his fraternisation with the town's lumpenproletariat. In April 1915, he began writing under the pseudonym Dionysios (Note: Alternative aliases include other spellings like Dionysos, Dyonisos, Dionisyos, Denis as well as "Julio Barco", "Pío Ayala" and "Fabio".) The following year, he and Francisco Jordán moved to Barcelona, where Birlán went to work at the offices of Tierra y Libertad. He wrote for every issue of the paper over the subsequent years, attempted to set up his own magazine La Idea Libre, and contributed to the publication of Solidaridad Obrera. When Tierra y Libertad was shut down in 1919, he continued occupying its offices and used them to distribute pamphlets around the country.

In 1922, he established Editorial Moderna, and in 1924, he began publishing Revista Nueva and contributed to La Revista Internacional Anarquista. During the years of the dictatorship of Primo de Rivera, he contributed to the magazines Vértice, Revista Obrera and Generación Consciente, wrote prologues for the works of Efim Yarchuk and translated the works of Joseph Déjacque. He also contributed book reviews for the Valencian magazine Estudios and published anthology collections. He briefly stayed in Argentina in 1929, writing for Izquierda de Buenos Aires. He supplemented his income with work as a proofreader for Rudolf Mosse and a translator of various anarchist works, including those of Peter Kropotkin and Errico Malatesta.

In 1928, García Birlán joined the central committee of the National Confederation of Labour (CNT), an anarchist trade union centre, and represented it at a congress of the International Workers' Association in Liège. He was also a member of the Solidaridad group of the Iberian Anarchist Federation (FAI) and oversaw the publication of its magazine Mañana. After the proclamation of the Second Spanish Republic, he remained Barcelona with his partner and built an archive in El Guinardó, with contributions from his friend Josep Prat. Following the outbreak of the Spanish Revolution of 1936, he joined the Economic Council of Catalonia as a representative of the FAI.

On 26 September 1936, García Birlán was appointed as Minister of Health and Social Assistance of the Catalan government. From this post, he appointed the physician Félix Martí Ibáñez as director of the Catalan health service. He served as Minister of Health until 17 December, although the anarchists would remain in control of the health ministry until May 1937. He then served as undersecretary to Diego Abad de Santillán, the Catalan Minister of Economy, until 4 April 1937. The following year, he worked as an assistant for Segundo Blanco, the Minister of Education and Health of the Spanish government. Throughout the war, García Birlán edited La Vanguardia and worked as a rapporteur for the graphic art workers' union of the CNT. In December 1938, he and other members of the FAI met with President Manuel Azaña calling for the removal of prime minister Juan Negrín, but they were forced to back down after Negrín himself threatened a coup.

=== Exile and later life ===
With the Nationalist Catalonia Offensive closing in, García Birlán fled the country in a lorry, while his partner remained behind in Barcelona. He attempted to bring his library with him, but was forced to throw his books out as more people got on board. In March 1939, he co-founded the Spanish Libertarian Movement and joined its general council. He struggled to continue writing under the Nazi occupation of France, but remained in contact with Juan López Sánchez and refused to solicit aid from his comrades. After the liberation of France, he attempted to bring Ada Martí into the CNT, but she refused his offer of membership. He then settled in Tolosa and returned to writing for publications such as Tiempos Nuevos, Cénit, CNT and Solidaridad Obrera. He also prepared numerous anthologies through publishing houses in Paris and Buenos Aires, which he hoped to publish after returning to Spain. After considering moving to Mexico, he instead returned to Argentina and settled in Rosario. Following the Spanish transition to democracy, in 1983, he finally returned to Spain and went to work at Editorial Americalee, through which he published numerous anthologies. He and his partner Antonia Rute moved to Barcelona, where he died on 20 June 1984.

== Bibliography ==
- Alexander, Robert J. (1999). The Anarchists in the Spanish Civil War. London: Janus Publishing Company. ISBN 978-1-85756-400-6.
- Bolloten, Burnett (1991). The Spanish Civil War: Revolution and Counterrevolution. University of North Carolina Press. ISBN 978-0-8078-1906-7.
- Casanova, Julián (2005). Preston, Paul (ed.). Anarchism, the Republic and Civil War in Spain: 1931–1939. Translated by Dowling, Andrew; Pollok, Graham. Routledge. ISBN 0-415-32095-X.
- Soriano Jiménez, Ignacio C. (2022). "Antonio García Birlán". Historia Hispánica (in Spanish). Royal Academy of History.
