= Federation of Workers' Societies of the Spanish Region =

Spanish trade union federation

- Federación de Sociedades Obreras de la Región Española
- Abbreviation: FSORE
- Predecessor: Pact of Union and Solidarity
- Successor: Workers' Solidarity
- Established: 13 October 1900; 126 years ago
- Dissolved: 1907; 119 years ago
- Type: National trade union federation
- Location: Spain
- Members: 73,000 (1901)

The Federation of Workers' Societies of the Spanish Region (Spanish: Federación de Sociedades Obreras de la Región Española; FSORE), also known as the Federation of Resistance Societies of the Spanish Region (Spanish: Federación de Sociedades de Resistencia de la Región Española; FSRRE), was a Spanish anarcho-syndicalist trade union federation which was active during the early 1900s. Following a period of economic crisis in Spain and the political repression of the anarchist movement during the previous decade, in 1900, Spanish trade unions came together to establish the FSORE as a means to coordinated solidarity between workers of different trades. The FSORE quickly grew to become the largest trade union federation in the country, although it faced difficulties organising workers due to the rapid advance of industrialisation and the entry of women in the workforce. The FSORE organised a number of strike actions in 1901 and 1902, particularly in Catalonia, culminating in the country's first general strike in Barcelona. The general strike was defeated and the trade union movement was suppressed, but a wave of strikes continued over the subsequent two years. By the mid-1900s, the FSORE had lost most of its support and went into a decline, formally dissolving in 1907. It was succeeded by the Barcelona trade union federation Workers' Solidarity (SO), which formed the nucleus for the National Confederation of Labour (CNT), founded in 1910.

== Background ==
During the late 19th century, the government of Spain had achieved a state of relative stability due to the Turno system, which alternated power between the Conservative and Liberal parties, causing the politics of Spain to remain stagnant. However, by the 1890s, the premium pricing of cotton and an economic surplus of textiles had caused political and economic instability in the northeastern industrial region of Catalonia. The Spanish defeat in the Spanish–American War exacerbated the crisis, sending the Catalan economy into an economic depression, as business owners lost a vital foreign exchange market and increased migration of unskilled workers from rural to urban areas created a surplus of labour. Disillusioned with the central government, Catalan business owners increasingly gravitated towards Catalan nationalism and formed the Regionalist League of Catalonia (LRC) to defend their economic interests. Other sections of the Catalan middle class turned towards the Republican Union (UR), which aligned itself against Catalan nationalism. In order to prevent the Catalans from uniting against the Spanish state, the government cultivated instability in the Catalan capital of Barcelona by playing the two parties off against each other.

In response to the labour surplus, employers sought to reduce workers' wages by purchasing new industrial machinery. They also refused to engage in collective bargaining with their workers and made frequent use of lockouts to force an end to industrial disputes. Low wages and persistent inflation made it increasingly difficult for working men to support their families on a single salary, which forced women and even children into the workforce. All this caused an increase in working class discontent, which attracted more workers towards the political philosophy of anarchism. This led to a rise in anarchist terrorism, as class conflict between business owners and the growing industrial working class erupted into open violence. The rise of anarchist terrorism provoked the political repression of the growing Spanish anarchist movement, which forced many of its leaders to flee the country and weakened the anarchists' connection with the labour movement.

== Establishment ==
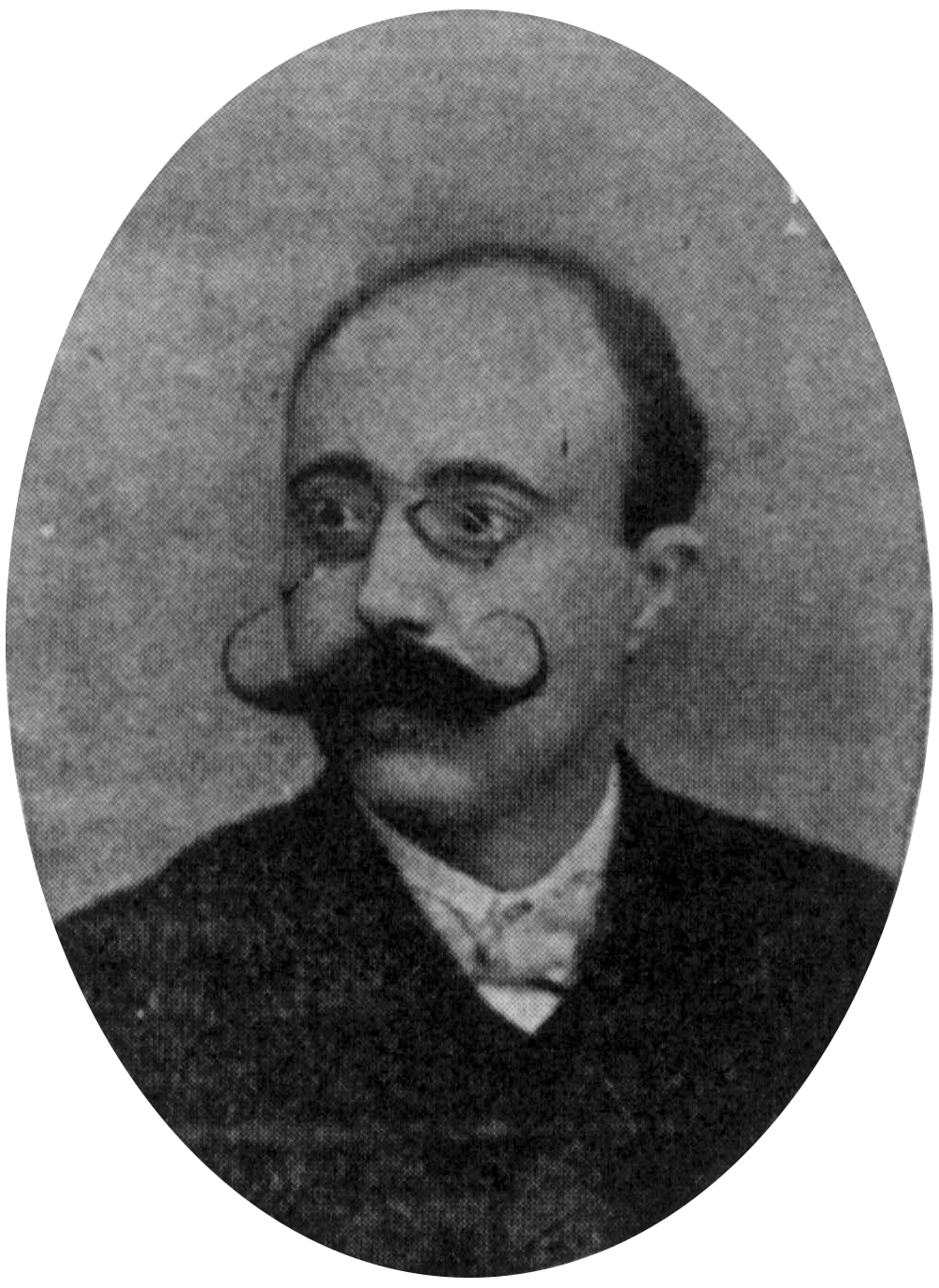
Josep Prat, who argued for Spanish anarchists to abandon the practice of propaganda of the deed

By the turn of the 20th century, Spanish anarchists were increasingly coming to believe that the use of violence had marginalised them from the rest of the working class. When Josep Prat returned from his exile in Argentina, he argued that the anarchist movement abandon the practice of propaganda of the deed. The number of cases of anarchist violence in Spain subsequently decreased, and the few acts of violence that occurred were carried out by foreign anarchists. Meanwhile, the political repression in the wake of the Montjuïc trial spurred an alliance between Spanish anarchists and previously non-aligned trade unionists. Spanish anarchists came under the influence of the French organisational theory of syndicalism, which they developed into the revolutionary political philosophy of anarcho-syndicalism. Trade union organising in Spain experienced a resurgence, with many anarchists calling for the establishment of a new national trade union federation.

On 13 October 1900, a bricklayers' trade union in the Spanish capital of Madrid convened a conference of trade unions, with the aim of establishing a national trade union federation. Delegates attending the congress represented 150 trade unions, with 50 more signalling their support for the initiative. Together the delegates represented roughly 50,000 workers, some of whom had previously been members of the Pact of Union and Solidarity (PUS) and had managed to keep their trade unions alive through the political repression of the previous decade. The conference acknowledged the French General Confederation of Labour (CGT) as its inspiration, and paid tribute to the anarcho-syndicalist theories of Fernand Pelloutier and Émile Pouget. Delegates expressed their opposition to politics and some were explicitly critical of the Spanish Socialist Workers' Party (PSOE). As their goal, they demanded the eight-hour day and higher wages. They centred the general strike as a means to achieve their demands, with anarchist delegates calling for general strikes in the event of police brutality or other forms of injustice. Delegates also expressed support for workers committing violence against their employers and even against the state.

The conference concluded with the establishment of the Federation of Workers' Societies of the Spanish Region (Spanish: Federación de Sociedades Obreras de la Region Espanola; FSORE). Although it was initially constituted as a politically non-aligned organisation, allowing a number of republican groups to join, the FSORE soon became fundamentally anarchist in orientation. The trade union federation was established according to anarcho-syndicalist principles and based its federal organisational structure on that of the old Federation of Workers of the Spanish Region (FTRE). It was thus constituted as a decentralised and libertarian organisation. Its base unit was its local trade unions (or "resistance societies"), which federated together on a regional basis. Its main aim was to organise workers of different trades and build solidarity between them. The new federation quickly began contacting syndicalist organisations in Italy, the United Kingdom and the United States.

In the first year of its existence, the federation grew from its initial 50,000 members to over 70,000 members, more than double the membership of the socialist-aligned Unión General de Trabajadores (UGT). In the anarchist newspaper La Protesta, Sidón Sequano proclaimed the growth of the FSORE to be a sign of the coming death of political socialism. Almost half of the FSORE's membership was drawn from Catalonia; 9% were based in the province of Cádiz; 5.5% from Málaga; 5% from Valencia; 5% from Murcia; 4.5% from Asturias and 3% from Madrid; the rest of the organisation's membership was diffused among the other regions of Spain. However, the FSORE never gained the adherence of the majority of Spanish workers.

== Strike actions ==
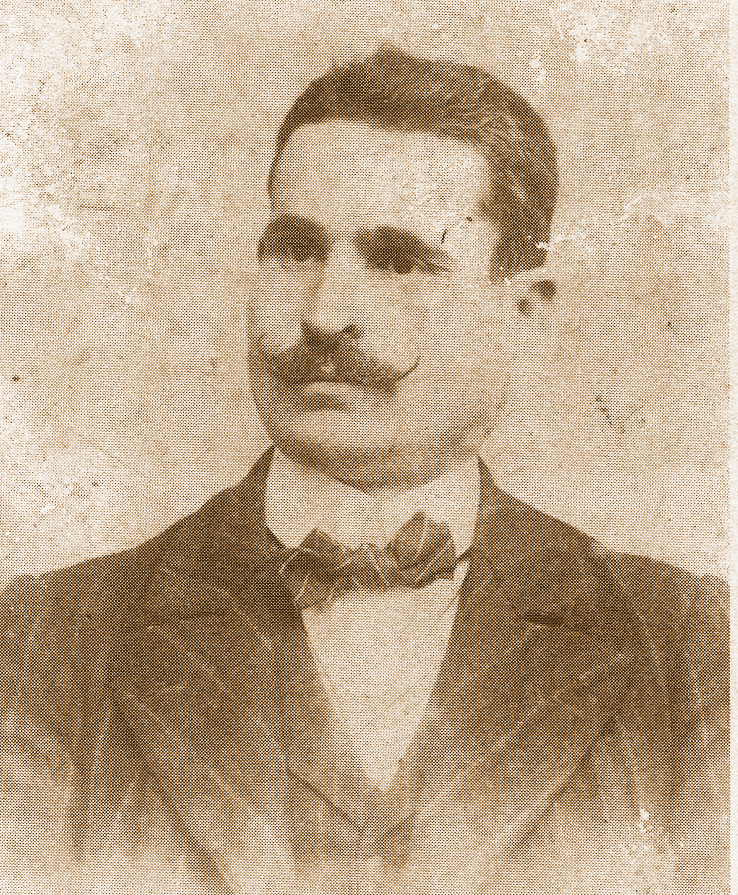
José Sánchez Rosa, a leader of the Andalusian agricultural unions of the FSORE

In 1901, a wave of strike actions broke out in the anarchist strongholds of Seville, Valencia and Zaragoza. Several towns in Andalusia went on strike demanding libertarian communism, some of which escalated into insurrection. The FSORE supported an attempt at a general strike in Xixón, but it failed, causing disillusionment in the city's working class. Andalusian agricultural workers, led by the anarchists José Sánchez Rosa and José Crespo, also established the Society of Agricultural Workers (Spanish: Sociedad de Obreros Agricultores; SOA), which affiliated itself with the FSORE. At the suggestion of the FSORE, Crespo and Miguel Solano Núñez attempted to establish a regional anarchist commission, but the criminalisation of the anarchist movement in Andalusia prevented any further organisation. In the spring of that year, yarn manufacturers in Catalonia's Ter valley attempted to replace its male workforce with women, who would work for lower pay on new spinning mules. When the workers went on strike, the employers responded with a lockout. This drew the attention of trade unions in Barcelona, who worried that the victory of the employers over the Ter valley strike would result in lower wages for workers in Catalonia's other industries. By the autumn of that year, the Barcelona trade unions began preparing for an open confrontation with the employers.

By this time, only one quarter of workers in Barcelona were affiliated with a trade union. The FSORE had faced particular difficulty organising the textile workers in the Barcelona metropolitan area, as the mills in the region largely employed women and children, who were paid less than their adult male counterparts. Workers were also ideologically divided, with anarchists, socialists and syndicalists all disagreeing on the objectives of the labour movement. While anarchists were firmly anti-statist, many trade unionists sought to negotiate concessions with the state and their employers, and saw revolution as a last resort. The distribution of workers between hundreds of small factories also made trade union organising difficult. The FSORE was also unable to establish itself in the everyday life of its membership, and failed to coordinate wide-scale support for strike actions. On the other side of the industrial dispute, employers were able to hire large numbers of unemployed and unskilled workers as strikebreakers. Catalan employers were also organised in the Foment del Treball Nacional, an employers' association which cooperated closely with the Spanish Army and police. Despite the challenges facing them, the anarchist workers of Barcelona were able to coordinate a response, drawing from the anarchist methods of direct action and self-organisation.

On 6 December 1901, 10,000 metalworkers in Barcelona went on strike, demanding the eight-hour day. Although they did not have strike pay, the workers managed to keep the strike going for eight weeks. But the employers refused to meet the workers demands, and even refused mediation. The newspaper El Diluvio warned the employers that the defeat of the strike could convince workers that violent action would be necessary, but the employers largely ignored public opinion on the issue. Growing sympathy from other trade unions in the Catalan capital culminated on 17 February 1902, when the Barcelona branch of the FSORE called a general strike in solidarity with the metalworkers. It was the first general strike in Spanish history.

Out of the city's 144,000 workers, an estimated 80,000 participated in the general strike. Even workers who were unaffiliated with the FSORE joined the strike. The strike was self-organised by the workers, without any clear demands or central leadership from union representatives. The economy of Barcelona was brought to a halt, with banks, cafes, shops, public transportation and newspaper printers all being shut down. Although the strike was largely peaceful, some street fights broke out between striking workers and the Spanish Army, and employers shut down their businesses out of fear of property damage. Within days, the general strike spread to other Catalan cities and even gained support from unions in other regions of Spain. A series of strikes in the Bay of Cádiz escalated into food riots, after employers pressured local merchants to deny credit to striking workers. Pedro Vallina went to Madrid to meet with Francisco Largo Caballero, the leader of the socialist-aligned UGT, seeking to gain the union's support for the general strike. Largo Caballero unilaterally rejected their request and questioned whether the strike would be successful. Vallina retorted with his belief that the strike would succeed, in spite of whether the socialists supported them or not. The socialist leadership also discouraged its members in San Sebastián, Valladolid and other industrial cities from joining the general strike.

The general strike ultimately lasted for a full workweek before being brought to an end. Over the weekend, the Spanish Army declared martial law and arrested many of the strike's leaders. Workers' attempts to resist the military aggression were futile. On 24 February, the workers of Barcelona returned to their jobs. In the wake of the general strike, many trade unions were suppressed and the anarchist movement was forced underground. It also led to a wider wave of strike actions throughout the country over the subsequent two years, although most of them were likewise suppressed by police. In southern Spain, the regional commission of the FSORE coordinated a series of agricultural strikes in Badajoz, Cádiz, Jerez, Granada and Valencia, demanding new contracts that would pay workers a daily wage. At the organisation's 3rd Congress in 1903, the FSORE recognised the participation of women in the workforce for the first time, with Dolores Gómez representing female workers of the canning industry in Santander.

== Decline and dissolution ==
In 1903, the FSORE began publishing a Boletin, but by this time its membership had substantially declined. Following a series of strikes in 1903, the government of Antonio Maura appointed Carlos González Rothwos as Civil Governor of Barcelona. The new administration arrested some 350 trade union activists, and shut down many social centres. In Alcalá de los Gazules, a FSORE-led political demonstration in support of the political prisoners escalated into an uprising, with local peasants attacking political officials and merchants, before being suppressed by the Civil Guard. Over the following year, as strikes were continuously defeated, the strike wave dissipated and some 2,000 trade unionists were dismissed from their jobs. The FSORE lost the support of several anarchist publications, including Tierra y Libertad, with many declaring anarchism to be incompatible with trade unionism. In 1904, crop failures caused a famine to break out in Andalusia, leading to the decline of the FSORE in the southern region. By 1905, the FSORE was effectively defunct. In 1907, it formally disbanded.

== Legacy ==
The dissolution of the FSORE caused the Spanish syndicalist movement to fragment. Over the course of the 1900s, Barcelona's trade union movement declined from 45,000 to 7,000 members. Many of Barcelona's workers defected from trade unionism and joined the Radical Republican Party (PRR). The PSOE denounced the anarchist practice of the general strike, warning that it would provoke repression and roll back the gains of collective bargaining. Socialist leader Pablo Iglesias attacked the anarchists over the Barcelona general strike, which he criticised for its lack of clear leadership and for having achieved no material gains for the metalworkers. The PSOE's affiliate trade union, the UGT, attempted to regain members from the anarchist unions. Although it recruited a number of skilled workers in Barcelona, the UGT was unable to gain a leading influence over the Catalan labour movement. While anti-politicism and violent action remained influential among Catalan workers, reformist socialism gained ground among workers in Madrid and miners in Asturias and Euskadi.

Anarchists turned inwards, refocusing on writing for subcultural publications, which once again marginalised them from the wider labour movement. Over the latter half of the 1900s, tensions between the anarchists and the PRR grew, which resulted in the labour movement becoming inert. Trade unionism in Catalonia eventually recovered and the FSORE was succeeded by the trade union federation Workers' Solidarity (SO), established in 1907. The anarchists revisited their experience of the 1902 general strike, coming to view strikes as a means by which trade unions could strengthen their organisational capacity and influence. The workers of Barcelona eventually went on to lead another general strike that culminated in an insurrection, which was suppressed in what came to be known as the Tragic Week. The anarcho-syndicalist movement eventually managed to break from its cycle of building short-lived organisations, with the establishment of the National Confederation of Labour (CNT) in 1910. Like the FSORE, the CNT initially refrained from explicitly declaring itself in favour of anarchism, while also holding to key anarchist principles and supporting the anarchist tactic of the general strike. But unlike the FSORE, the CNT required its affiliates to pay union dues and keep detailed information on its membership, which would be overseen by the organisation's executive committee. It also established the newspaper Solidaridad Obrera, which maintained a direct connection between the organisation and its members, something the FSORE lacked for most of its existence.

== Bibliography ==
- Baer, James A. (2015). Anarchist Immigrants in Spain and Argentina. University of Illinois Press. ISBN 978-0-252-03899-0.
- Bookchin, Murray (1978). "The New Ferment". The Spanish Anarchists: The Heroic Years 1868–1936. Harper & Row. pp. 128–143. ISBN 0-06-090607-3.
- Esenwein, George Richard (1989). "Epilogue". Anarchist Ideology and the Working-class Movement in Spain, 1868-1898. University of California Press. pp. 205–215. ISBN 978-0520063983.
- Kaplan, Temma (1977). Anarchists of Andalusia, 1868-1903. Princeton University Press. ISBN 9781400869718.
- Ouziel, Pablo (2015). 'Vamos Lentos Porque Vamos Lejos': Towards a dialogical understanding of Spain's 15Ms (PhD). University of Victoria.
- Ullman, Joan Connelly (1968). The Tragic Week: A Study of Anticlericalism in Spain, 1875-1912. Harvard University Press. doi:10.4159/harvard.9780674434189. ISBN 9780674434172.
- Yeoman, James Michael (2020). "The Cult of Reason: Anarchism and Education, 1899–1906". Print Culture and the Formation of the Anarchist Movement in Spain, 1890-1915. Routledge. pp. 120–197. ISBN 978-0-367-40797-1.
