= Solidaridad Obrera =

Solidaridad Obrera could refer to:

- Solidaridad Obrera (historical union), the union founded in 1907
- Solidaridad Obrera (periodical), the newspaper founded in 1907
- Confederación Sindical Solidaridad Obrera, the union founded in 1990
