= Pedro Herrera Camarero =

Spanish anarcho-syndicalist (1909–1969)

Minister of Health and Social Welfare of Catalonia
- In office 17 December 1936 – 3 April 1937
- President: Lluís Companys
- Prime Minister: Josep Tarradellas
- Preceded by: Antonio García Birlán
- Succeeded by: Josep Juan i Domènech

Personal details
- Born: 18 January 1909 Valladolid, Old Castile, Spain
- Died: 28 October 1969 (aged 60) Buenos Aires, Argentina
- Occupation: Railway worker
- Organisations: National Confederation of Labour; Iberian Anarchist Federation

Pedro Herrera Camarero (1908–1969) was a Spanish anarchist politician and trade unionist. A railway worker by trade, he joined the National Confederation of Labour (CNT) and became a leading figure in its railway industrial federation. In the early 1930s, he moved to Barcelona and joined the Iberian Anarchist Federation (FAI). During the Spanish Revolution of 1936, he was appointed as Minister of Health and Social Assistance of Catalonia and oversaw the legalisation of abortion in the region. Later in the war, he established the International Anti-fascist Solidarity (SIA) and opposed collaboration with the government of Juan Negrín. In exile, he co-founded the Spanish Libertarian Movement (MLE), participated in the Algerian anarchist movement and joined the orthodox faction of the CNT. He later moved to Buenos Aires, where he joined the Argentine Libertarian Federation.

== Biography ==
Pedro Herrera Camarero was born on 18 January 1908, in the Castilian city of Valladolid. At a young age, he went to work as a railway worker and joined the National Confederation of Labour (CNT), an anarchist trade union centre. He became a lover of the arts, particularly literature, and learned to bind books so he could keep his library well-stocked.

After the proclamation of the Second Spanish Republic in 1931, he became a leading figure of the CNT's National Federation of Railway Industry as a union representative of the Valladolid railway workers. He wrote extensively for Cultura Ferroviaria, contributing to the growth of the CNT's railway union until it was a comparable size to its counterpart in the socialist-aligned General Workers' Union (UGT). In February 1932, he represented Valladolid at a national plenary meeting of the CNT, and in November 1932, he attended the First National Railway Congress in Madrid. In the summer of 1933, he moved to the Catalan capital of Barcelona, where he attended an extraordinary congress of the CNT. In March 1936, he attended the Second National Railway Congress at the Teatro Pavón in Madrid. He also joined the Nervio group of the Iberian Anarchist Federation (FAI), which he organised together with Diego Abad de Santillán. The Nervio group went on to form the Peninsular Committee of the FAI, which Herrera and Abad de Santillán served on.

Following the Spanish Revolution of 1936, he represented the FAI in negotiations with other Republican parties and trade unions, ultimately giving his support to the FAI joining the Catalan government. In December 1936, he took over from Antonio García Birlán as Minister of Health and Social Assistance. From this post, on 25 December, he signed a decree that legalised and regulated abortion in Catalonia. He also wrote the prologue to a book about abortion reform by the physician Félix Martí Ibáñez. He served as minister until April 1937. From 1937, he was the general secretary of the Peninsular Committee of the FAI. He also established International Anti-fascist Solidarity (SIA) and served as its first general secretary. From these positions, he attempted to deescalate the street fighting during the May Days in speeches on the radio. That summer, he served on the CNT-UGT liaison committee. He opposed collaboration with the government of Juan Negrín, which led him to distance himself from Mariano R. Vázquez, the general secretary of the CNT. He called for a return to anarchist principles, which he believed the leaders of the CNT had abandoned. He also signed a document addressed to a meeting of the International Workers' Association, in which the FAI justified the militarisation of the confederal militias as a necessary response to the military situation. Throughout the Spanish Civil War, he wrote for Solidaridad Obrera and Tierra y Libertad.

With the Nationalist Catalonia Offensive, in early 1939, he fled the country to France, where he participated in the creation of the Spanish Libertarian Movement and joined its general council. Following the Nazi occupation of France, he was imprisoned in Camp Vernet and was later deported to Djelfa, in Algeria. There he joined the Algerian anarchist movement and contributed to its newspaper Solidarité Ouvrière from 1944 to 1947. He then returned to France, where he was appointed as international secretary of the orthodox faction of the CNT. In 1950, he moved to Argentina, settled in Buenos Aires and went to work as an accountant. He was reunited with Abad de Santillán, with whom he participated in the Argentine Libertarian Federation and wrote for the publication Reconstruir. Herrera died on 28 June 1969; his coffin was wrapped in an anarchist red and black flag and cremated.

== Selected works ==
- La Asociación Internacional de los Trabajadores (1946)

== Bibliography ==
- Alexander, Robert J. (1999). The Anarchists in the Spanish Civil War. London: Janus Publishing Company. ISBN 978-1-85756-400-6.
- Evans, Danny (2018). "The experience of defeat, 1937–1939". Revolution and the State: Anarchism in the Spanish Civil War, 1936–1939. Routledge. pp. 163–197. ISBN 978-1-138-06314-3.
- Pagès i Blanch, Pelai (2013) [2007]. War and Revolution in Catalonia, 1936–1939. Translated by Gallagher, Patrick. Brill. ISBN 978-90-04-25426-8.
- Soriano Jiménez, Ignacio C. (2022). "Pedro Herrera Camarero". Historia Hispánica (in Spanish). Royal Academy of History.
