= Ada Martí =

Catalan journalist (1914–1960)

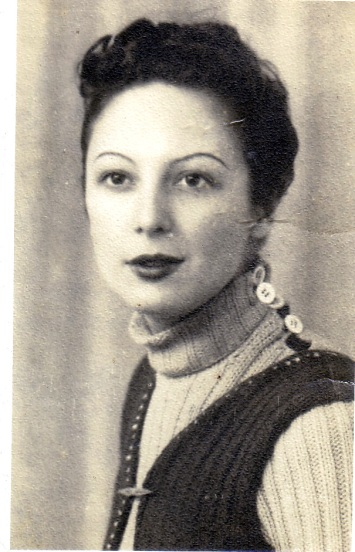
- Martí in 1940
- Born: Concepció Martí Vall; 24 June 1914; Barcelona, Catalonia, Spain
- Died: 1 December 1960 (aged 46); Paris, France
- Occupations: Journalist and writer
- Movement: Anarchism

Concepció Martí Vall (29 June 1914 – 1 December 1960), commonly known as Ada Martí, was a Catalan journalist and writer. As a student, she was first drawn towards the radical politics of anarchism, freethought and Catalan nationalism, which led her to participate in the Revolution of 1934 and the Spanish Revolution of 1936. She wrote for several anarchist periodicals during the Spanish Civil War, and established student groups to support the revolution.

After the war, she fled to France, where she provided aid to Spanish refugees and came into contact with the French philosophy of existentialism. During the 1950s, she slipped into a depression, which was exacerbated by persistent insomnia and her inability to see her children, who she had placed in boarding schools. After a number of suicide attempts, she died of an overdose while attempting to treat her insomnia.

== Biography ==
Ada Martí Vall was born into a Catalan middle-class family in Barcelona on 29 June 1914. As a university student, she became an anarchist and led a freethinkers' student group. She soon joined the Catalan nationalist movement and participated in the Revolution of 1934, during which she was wounded while defending the CADCI alongside Jaume Compte. She lived in a flat in Poble-sec, where she spent much of her time reading the works of philosophers such as Søren Kierkegaard, François Rabelais and Miguel de Unamuno, and frequently corresponded with Pío Baroja. She particularly identified with the nihilism of Friedrich Nietzsche and Arthur Schopenhauer, which led her to state that "anarchism is like silence: as soon as it is spoken of, it is denied."

By 1936, Martí was regularly attending anarchist gatherings organised by the Argentine writer Rodolfo González Pacheco. During these gatherings, she met and fell in love with José María Lunazzi. But after the outbreak of the Spanish Civil War, when Lunazzi joined the Durruti Column, she broke up with him upon seeing him dressed in a military uniform. Throughout the civil war, she wrote for numerous anarchist publications, including La Revista Blanca, Solidaridad Obrera, El Amigo del Pueblo, Tierra y Libertad and Mujeres Libres. She maintained a position against collaboration with the Republican government, rejected the nascent cult of personality around Buenaventura Durruti and Francisco Ascaso, and centred the self-emancipation of women in the Spanish Revolution. In late 1937, Martí went to speak at a congress in Valencia, where she co-founded the Iberian Federation of Revolutionary Students (FIER) and its magazine Fuego, which she edited. She clashed with Serafín Aliaga, one of the leaders of the Libertarian Youth, as she wanted the FIER to be an active organisation based in trade union struggle, rather than a philosophical discussion group. On 20 December 1937, she also founded the Workers' Institutes, which provided a higher education to young workers.

She fled Spain in the wake of the Nationalist's Aragon Offensive, and went into clandestinity in France. During World War II, she provided aid to Spanish refugees and organised with other anarchists, though she never participated in the French Resistance. After the war, in 1946, Antonio García Birlán and Gaston Leval attempted to bring her into the National Confederation of Labour (CNT), but she refused their offer. She moved to Paris, where she frequented the Café de Flore and became interested in the existentialism of Jean-Paul Sartre, Albert Camus and Simone de Beauvoir. She helped her friend Eva Cascante escape from Allied-occupied Austria to Paris, and together they developed their philosophy of free love, attempting to overcome their indoctrination into Christian morality.

Martí gave birth to a son, Federico, in February 1948. Although she despised the institution of marriage, she briefly married the boy's father; she divorced him by September of that same year and obtained custody of their child. A few years later, she sent her son to a boarding school; however, she was unable to afford to visit him, which caused her to slip into a depression. She wrote to a friend that: "everything essential, the only truly important thing, seems to have died in me". She soon fell in love with a Russian bookseller, who provided her with financial stability and brought her out of her depression. In 1953, Martí gave birth to their daughter, Claudia, and her partner abandoned them soon after. Her mental health again went into a decline.

By 1956, Martí was living in Saint-Germain-des-Prés with a new partner, while her children lived away from her in boarding schools. She asked a friend to adopt her children, but they refused, so she attempted suicide. Her partner left her soon after. By the following year, she was living with a new partner, a Hungarian exile, in an unfurnished flat on Rue Notre-Dame-des-Champs. She worked as a second-hand bookseller, selling Spanish literature on the banks of the Seine. She again slipped into a depression, exacerbated by persisent insomnia, her loss of her capacity to speak Catalan or Spanish due to her immersion in French, financial difficulties, and her estrangement from her children. On 29 August 1959, her son Federico died due to complications from a surgery. She placed her daughter in a convent school and again attempted suicide several more times, classifying her attempts as a rebellion against "a life of suffering". On 1 December 1960, while trying to treat her chronic insomnia, she overdosed on sleeping pills. Her materials and correspondence were collected by the Spanish historian Abel Paz, whose work allowed a biography about her to be assembled.

== Selected works ==
- "Sentando posiciones estudiantiles libres" (Solidaridad Obrera, 26 August 1936)
- "La posición de la mujer en la nueva sociedad" (Solidaridad Obrera, 18 October 1936)

== Bibliography ==
- Casasús i Guri, Josep M. (10 March 2023). "Concepció Martí Vall (Ada Martí)". Diccionari històric de periodistes catalans (in Catalan).
- Guillamón, Agustín (8 November 2018). "Ada Martí (1914–1960)". Ser Histórico (in Spanish).
