= Solidaridad Obrera (historical union) =

Catalan trade union federation (1907–1910)

Workers' Solidarity
- Solidaritat Obrera
- Abbreviation: SO
- Predecessor: Federation of Workers' Societies of the Spanish Region
- Successor: National Confederation of Labour
- Formation: 3 August 1907; 119 years ago
- Dissolved: 1 November 1910; 116 years ago
- Type: Regional trade union federation
- Headquarters: Barcelona
- Location: Catalonia, Spain
- Members: 25,000 (1908)
- Official languages: Catalan, Spanish
- General Secretary: Antoni Colomé (1907–1908); Jaume Bisbe (1908); Josep Roman (1908–1909); Josep Negre (1909–1910)
- Main organ: Solidaridad Obrera

Workers' Solidarity (Spanish: Solidaridad Obrera; Catalan: Solidaritat Obrera; SO) was a regional federation of trade unions in Catalonia. Established in 1907, following a series of unsuccessful attempts to establish a national trade union centre in Spain, SO united many of Barcelona's disparate anarchist and socialist trade unions into a single federation. The two factions of the organisation struggled to influence it in their favoured direction, while also clashing with the Radical Republican Party (PRR). In 1909, SO organised a general strike in Catalonia, which escalated into an insurrection known as the Tragic Week. The organisation was suppressed in the wake of the uprising, but managed to reorganise itself following the rise to power of a liberal government. In 1910, it merged together with other regional trade union federations into the National Confederation of Labour (CNT).

== Background ==
The first national trade union federation in Spain was the Spanish Regional Federation of the International Workingmen's Association (FRE-AIT), established by the 1870 Barcelona Workers' Congress. Its membership largely consisted of the libertarian followers of Mikhail Bakunin, led by the Italian Giuseppe Fanelli. Attempts by Paul Lafargue to bring it under the influence of Marxism caused divisions within the FRE-AIT, eventually developing into a split. The Marxists were expelled from the FRE-AIT in 1872; they went on to establish the Spanish Socialist Workers' Party (PSOE) and its affiliate trade union federation the Unión General de Trabajadores (UGT). In 1881, the libertarian remnants of the FRE reorganised into the Federation of Workers of the Spanish Region (FTRE), but this also fell to internal divisions between collectivist and communist anarchists.

Continued political repression of and internal divisions within the Spanish anarchist movement made it difficult to establish a lasting libertarian workers' organisation. In 1890, the FTRE reorganised into the Union and Solidarity Pact (PUS), but this dissolved by 1896. In 1900, libertarians attempted to re-establish a national trade union federation with the Federation of Workers' Societies of the Spanish Region (FSORE), but most libertarian trade unions continued to act independently. By this time, a new generation of trade union leaders was beginning to take over the Spanish labour movement. They distanced themselves from the old 19th century model of trade unionism and criticised the previous generation of trade union leaders for accepting their own social marginalisation. Over the 1900s, strike actions became more commonplace, leading to the rising influence of anarcho-syndicalism over the labour movement.

The defeat of a general strike in 1902 resulted in the collapse of many trade unions in Catalonia. Over the subsequent years, Catalan workers largely ceased trade union activity and joined Alejandro Lerroux's Radical Republican Party (PRR). The radical republicans held large political demonstrations and established a network of social centres called People's Houses (Spanish: Casas del Pueblo), from which they served poor people free food, provided them with a popular education and hosted cheap theatre shows. While the radicals attracted large numbers of workers, the remaining Catalan trade unions were unable to provide the same level of mutual aid, having largely disbanded or gone into clandestinity.

== Establishment ==
By 1907, trade unions in the Catalan capital of Barcelona had recovered enough strength to hold a workers' congress. In June 1907, delegates representing unions of bakers, metalworkers, painters, typesetters and retail clerks met to discuss the formation of a local trade union federation. On 3 August 1907, a coalition of Catalan anarchist and socialist workers came together to establish the local trade union federation Workers' Solidarity (Spanish: Solidaridad Obrera; SO). The anarchist membership of the SO was drawn from a wide range of trades, including construction, typography and metallurgy. The socialists were largely retail or white-collar workers, while the reformists were predominant among the textile workers.

Neither the anarchists nor the socialists held definitive control over SO, and the two factions cooperated with each other on the basis of trade union independence from political parties. On this, they were inspired by the apoliticism of the French General Confederation of Labour (CGT), a syndicalist trade union confederation which sought to organise all workers regardless of their political views. The SO advocated for class conflict and direct action, with the ultimate aim of overthrowing capitalism. In the place of capitalism, it sought to establish a socialist economy based on workers' self-management. Irrespective of its long-term goals, the organisation's initial focus was on immediate improvements to working conditions, such as the achievement of collective bargaining rights.

SO established its headquarters at a syndicalist centre in Barcelona, where it published its self-titled newspaper Solidaridad Obrera. Established in October 1907, the paper attracted contributions from anarchist authors such as Anselmo Lorenzo, Ricardo Mella and Josep Prat. Over the subsequent year, SO's membership extended to other parts of Catalonia. In September 1908, a regional workers' congress transformed SO from a local trade union federation, confined to Barcelona, into a regional trade union federation that counted workers from throughout Catalonia. By this time, SO counted 112 trade unions, representing 25,000 workers in total. SO also received support from Ángel Ossorio y Gallardo, the Civil Governor of Barcelona, who was close with the organisation's socialist members.

== Conflicts ==
Before long, an internal conflict broke out between the anarchist and socialist factions of SO. The socialists, led by Antoni Badia and Antoni Fabra, wanted to merge SO into the UGT and use it as an organ to recruit members into the Catalan Federation of the PSOE. They were opposed by the anarcho-syndicalists, led by Leopoldo Bonafulla, Tomás Herreros and José Rodríguez Romero, and supported by Francesc Ferrer, who sought to marginalise the socialists and influence SO towards revolutionary syndicalism. They quickly brought the publication Solidaridad Obrera under an anarchist editorial staff, and on 13 June 1909, they influenced the SO congress to adopt the tactic of the general strike.

Through the Barcelona Modern School and the production cooperative La Niotipia, the syndicalists of SO also briefly collaborated with the PRR and Anselmo Lorenzo's orthodox anarchist group. But conflict with these groups came to a head after a leading SO member, Tomás Herreros, was expelled from La Niotipia. In their publications, members of SO sought to differentiate their modern approach to syndicalism from the older generation of anarchists, who had aligned themselves with Lerroux's radical republicanism. On 3 July 1909, SO founded their own ateneu, the Syndicalist Athenaeum, which they established in their own headquarters.

== Tragic Week ==
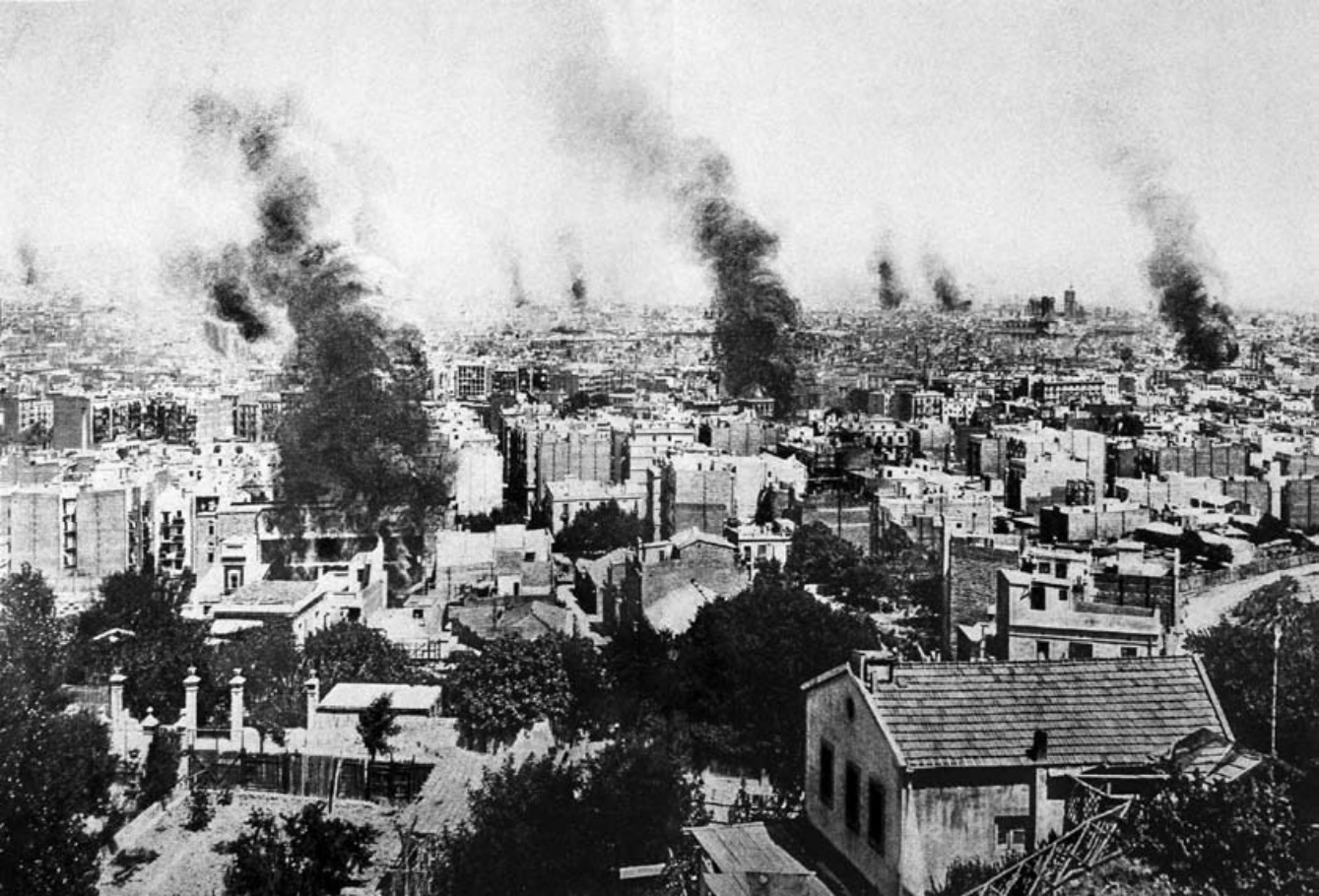
Barcelona during the Tragic Week

In the spring of 1909, business owners in Barcelona carried out a lockout of textile workers, as part of an attempt to cut their wages. At an SO assembly in early July 1909, delegates moved to plan a general strike in solidarity with the textile workers. At the same time, the government of Spain began conscripting reservists to fight in the Second Melillan campaign in Spanish Morocco.

On the night of 24 July 1909, the SO leader José Rodríguez Romero and the anarchist teacher Miguel Villalobos established a central committee to coordinate a general strike. They solicited support from other SO officials, including leading Catalan socialists, who joined the committee without consulting their leaders in Madrid. On 26 July 1909, Solidaridad Obrera called a general strike in Barcelona. By the following day, the general strike had escalated into an insurrection and Barcelona fell under workers' control.

The uprising was ultimately suppressed by government forces, in what became known as the Tragic Week. In the political repression that followed, the libertarian educator Francesc Ferrer, who had supported the strike, was arrested and executed. SO's membership numbers also declined, with more moderate members leaving the organisation. The repression convinced the remaining members, largely made up of anarcho-syndicalists, that they needed to establish a national trade union centre which could organise a militant opposition to capitalism and the state. The anarcho-syndicalists soon consolidated control over SO.

== Reorganisation ==
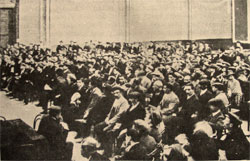
Founding congress of the Confederación Nacional del Trabajo (CNT) in 1910

In the wake of the Tragic Week, on 21 October 1909, the conservative government of Antonio Maura was removed by a coalition of liberals and republicans led by Segismundo Moret and José Canalejas, who rolled back many of the government's repressive policies. Martial law was lifted in Catalonia and an amnesty declared for anarchists who were imprisoned for the uprising. This change in government allowed the Catalan trade unions to return to public activism. On 18 December 1909, a workers' assembly reorganised the SO, which now counted 67 unions and 4,500 members. The assembly also renounced any official role of the organisation in the general strike and denied any affiliation with Ferrer.

By 1910, regional trade union federations were being established throughout Spain, where political repression by the Maura government had been less severe than in Catalonia. A number of these organisations began to request membership in the SO, which prompted it to expand its scope from the Catalan region into that of a national trade union centre. In October-November 1910, the remaining militants of Solidaridad Obrera held a workers' congress in Barcelona, where delegates of trade union federations from throughout Spain met to establish a national trade union federation: the Confederación Nacional del Trabajo (English: National Confederation of Labour; CNT). Socialists refused to participate in the formation of the CNT, leading to a conflict between the new organisation and the UGT. Within a decade, the CNT had grown to number hundreds of thousands of members, absorbing many of the old Catalan trade unions that had resisted joining SO.

== Bibliography ==
- Bar, Antonio (1990). "The CNT: The Glory and Tragedy of Spanish Anarchosyndicalism". In van der Linden, Marcel; Thorpe, Wayne (eds.). Revolutionary Syndicalism: An International Perspective. Scolar Press. pp. 119–139. ISBN 0-85967-815-6.
- Bookchin, Murray (1978). "The "Tragic Week"". The Spanish Anarchists: The Heroic Years 1868–1936. Harper & Row. pp. 143–157. ISBN 0-06-090607-3.
- Damier, Vadim (2009) [2000]. Anarcho-syndicalism in the 20th Century. Translated by Archibald, Malcolm. Edmonton: Black Cat Press. ISBN 978-0-9737827-6-9.
- Gabriel, Pere (2002). "Red Barcelona in the Europe of war and revolution, 1914–30". In Smith, Angel (ed.). Red Barcelona: Social Protest and Labour Mobilization in the Twentieth Century. Routledge. pp. 44–65. ISBN 0-203-21937-6.
- Gómez Casas, Juan (1986). Anarchist Organisation: The History of the F.A.I. Black Rose Books. ISBN 0-920057-40-3. OCLC 15252503.
- Smith, Angel (2002). "From subordination to contestation: the rise of labour in Barcelona, 1898–1918". In Smith, Angel (ed.). Red Barcelona: Social Protest and Labour Mobilization in the Twentieth Century. Routledge. pp. 17–43. ISBN 0-203-21937-6.
- Thorpe, Wayne (1989). "Syndicalism Outside France". The Workers Themselves. Kluwer Academic Publishers. pp. 28–47. ISBN 0-7923-0276-1. LCCN 89-8205.
- van der Walt, Lucien; Schmidt, Michael (2009). Black Flame: The Revolutionary Class Politics of Anarchism and Syndicalism. Edinburgh: AK Press. ISBN 978-1-904859-16-1. LCCN 2006933558. OCLC 1100238201.
