= List of ministers of health of Catalonia =

Minister of Health of Catalonia
- Conseller de Salut de Catalunya
- Seal of the Generalitat of Catalonia

- Flag of Catalonia

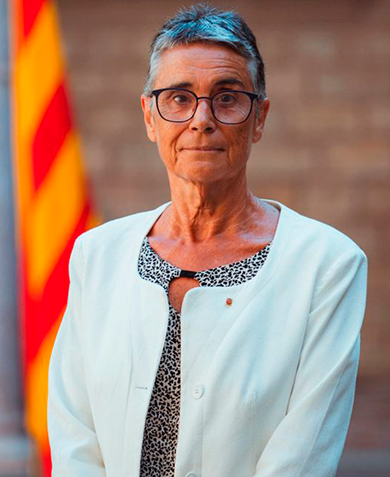
- Incumbent; Olga Pané since 12 August 2024
- Department of Health
- Member of: Executive Council of Catalonia
- Reports to: President of Catalonia
- Seat: Barcelona
- Appointer: President of Catalonia
- Inaugural holder: Manuel Carrasco Formiguera
- Formation: 24 April 1931
- Website: Department of Health, Catalonia

This article lists the ministers of health of Catalonia.

== List ==
Ministers of Health
Name	Portrait	Party	Took office	Left office	President	Ministerial title	References
Manuel Carrasco Formiguera		Catalan Republican Party	24 April 1931	29 December 1931	Francesc Macià	Minister of Health and Charity	
Josep Jové i Surroca		Independent	29 December 1931	3 October 1932	Francesc Macià	Minister of Health and Charity	
Antoni Xirau i Palau		Republican Left of Catalonia	3 October 1932	20 November 1932	Francesc Macià	Minister of Health and Charity	
Josep Tarradellas		Republican Left of Catalonia	19 December 1932	24 January 1933	Francesc Macià	Minister of Governance and Health	
Josep Dencàs i Puigdollers		Republican Left of Catalonia	24 January 1933	3 January 1934	Francesc Macià	Minister of Health and Social Assistance	
Josep Dencàs i Puigdollers		Republican Left of Catalonia	3 January 1934	18 September 1934	Lluís Companys	Minister of Health	
Pere Mestres i Albet		Republican Left of Catalonia	18 September 1934	13 October 1934	Lluís Companys	Minister of Public Works and Health	
Pere Mestres i Albet		Republican Left of Catalonia	1 March 1936	26 May 1936	Lluís Companys	Minister of Public Works and Health	
Manuel Corachan i Garcia		Republican Left of Catalonia	26 May 1936	31 July 1936	Lluís Companys	Minister of Health	
Martí Rouret i Callol		Republican Left of Catalonia	31 July 1936	26 September 1936	Lluís Companys	Minister of Health	
Antoni Garcia i Birlan		Confederación Nacional del Trabajo	26 September 1936	17 December 1936	Lluís Companys	Minister of Health and Social Assistance	
Pedro Herrera Camarero		Confederación Nacional del Trabajo	17 December 1936	3 April 1937	Lluís Companys	Minister of Health and Social Assistance	
Josep Juan i Domènech		Confederación Nacional del Trabajo	3 April 1937	16 April 1937	Lluís Companys	Minister of Economy, Public Services, Health and Social Assistance	
Aurelio Fernández Sánchez		Confederación Nacional del Trabajo	16 April 1937	5 May 1937	Lluís Companys	Minister of Health and Social Assistance	
Valeri Mas i Casas		Confederación Nacional del Trabajo	5 May 1937	29 June 1937	Lluís Companys	Minister of Economy, Public Services, Health and Social Assistance	
Antoni Maria Sbert i Massanet		Republican Left of Catalonia	29 June 1937	2 February 1939	Lluís Companys	Minister of Governance and Social Assistance	
Ramon Espasa i Oliver		Socialists' Party of Catalonia	5 December 1977	8 May 1980	Josep Tarradellas	Minister of Health and Social Assistance	
Josep Laporte i Salas		Democratic Convergence of Catalonia	8 May 1980	4 July 1988	Jordi Pujol	Minister of Health and Social Assistance	
Xavier Trias		Democratic Convergence of Catalonia	4 July 1988	11 January 1996	Jordi Pujol	Minister of Health and Social Assistance	
Eduard Rius i Pey		Democratic Convergence of Catalonia	11 January 1996	4 November 2002	Jordi Pujol	Minister of Health and Social Assistance	
Xavier Pomés i Abella		Democratic Convergence of Catalonia	4 November 2002	17 December 2003	Jordi Pujol	Minister of Health and Social Assistance	
Marina Geli		Socialists' Party of Catalonia	17 December 2003	27 December 2010	Pasqual Maragall	Minister of Health	
Marina Geli		Socialists' Party of Catalonia	17 December 2003	27 December 2010	José Montilla	Minister of Health	
Boi Ruiz i Garcia		Independent	27 December 2010	14 January 2016	Artur Mas	Minister of Health	
Antoni Comín		Independent	14 January 2016	28 October 2017	Carles Puigdemont	Minister of Health	
Alba Vergés		Republican Left of Catalonia	2 June 2018	26 May 2021	Quim Torra	Minister of Health	
Josep Maria Argimon		Independent	26 May 2021	7 October 2022	Pere Aragonès	Minister of Health	
Manuel Balcells i Díaz		Republican Left of Catalonia	10 October 2022	12 August 2024	Pere Aragonès	Minister of Health	
Olga Pané		Independent	12 August 2024	Incumbent	Salvador Illa	Minister of Health	
