= Urania Mella Serrano =

Spanish Galician politician

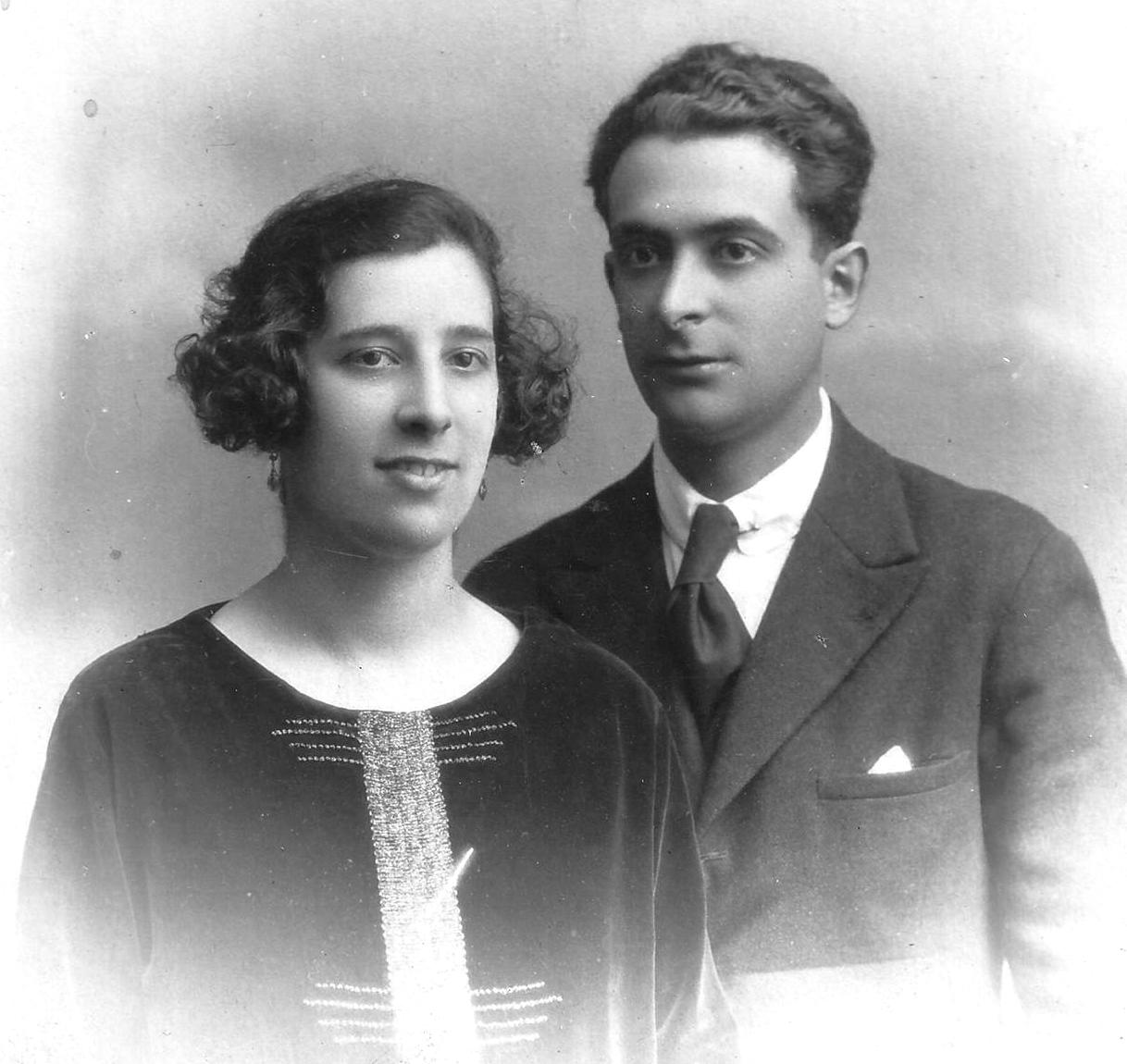
Urania Mella (1899–1945) & Humberto Solleiro (1896–1936).

Urania Mella Serrano, (Vigo, 1899 - Lugo, 1945) was a Galician politician, and forerunner of the women's associationism. Her father was the anarchist intellectual Ricardo Mella Cea, and her mother, Esperanza Serrano, was the daughter of Juan Serrano Oteiza, a well-known anarchist from Madrid and founder of the magazine Revista Social. Urania was president of the viguese branch of the Union of Antifascist Women.

Urania married Humberto Solleiro, with whom she had four children. Following the Spanish coup of July 1936, they both fled but were arrested in Redondela and were both sentenced to death. Urania's sentence was commuted to imprisonment for twelve years of which she served nine before being released. She returned to Galicia where she died from a brain tumour a month later.
