= Anarchists of Andalusia, 1868–1903 =

1977 book

- Author: Temma Kaplan
- Subject: Anarchism in Spain
- Publisher: Princeton University Press
- Publication date: 1977
- Pages: 266

Anarchists of Andalusia, 1868–1903 is a 1977 history book about Spanish anarchists by Temma Kaplan.

== Bibliography ==
- Alúm, Rolando A. (1979). "Review of Anarchists of Andalusia, 1868–1903". American Anthropologist. 81 (3): 677–678. doi:10.1525/aa.1979.81.3.02a00370. ISSN 0002-7294. JSTOR 675810.
- Boyd, Carolyn P. (1977). "Review of Anarchists of Andalusia, 1868–1903". The American Historical Review. 82 (5): 1268–1269. doi:10.2307/1856432. ISSN 0002-8762. JSTOR 1856432.
- Evans, Judith (1979). "Review of Anarchists of Andalusia, 1868–1903". Science & Society. 43 (3): 368–371. doi:10.1177/003682377904300312. ISSN 0036-8237. JSTOR 40402193.
- Gilmore, David (1978). "Review of Anarchists of Andalusia, 1868–1903". The Journal of Interdisciplinary History. 9 (2): 354–355. doi:10.2307/203243. ISSN 0022-1953. JSTOR 203243.
- Judt, Tony (1980). "The Rules of the Game (Rev. of Anarchists of Andalusia, 1868–1903)". The Historical Journal. 23 (1): 181–191. doi:10.1017/S0018246X00023980. ISSN 0018-246X. JSTOR 2638714. S2CID 159479702.
- Merkes, Manfred (1979). "Review of Anarchists of Andalusia, 1868–1903". Historische Zeitschrift. 229 (2): 456–457. ISSN 0018-2613. JSTOR 27621364.
- Pike, Fredrick B. (1977). "Two Favorite Iberian 'Isms'". The Review of Politics. 39 (4): 548–552. doi:10.1017/S0034670500025018. ISSN 0034-6705. JSTOR 1407294. S2CID 251375992.
- Robinson, R. A. H. (1980). "Review of Anarchists of Andalusia, 1868–1903". History. 65 (213): 145–146. ISSN 0018-2648. JSTOR 24419314.
