= Attempted assassination of Arsenio Martínez Campos =

1893 assassination attempt on the Catalonia Captain General

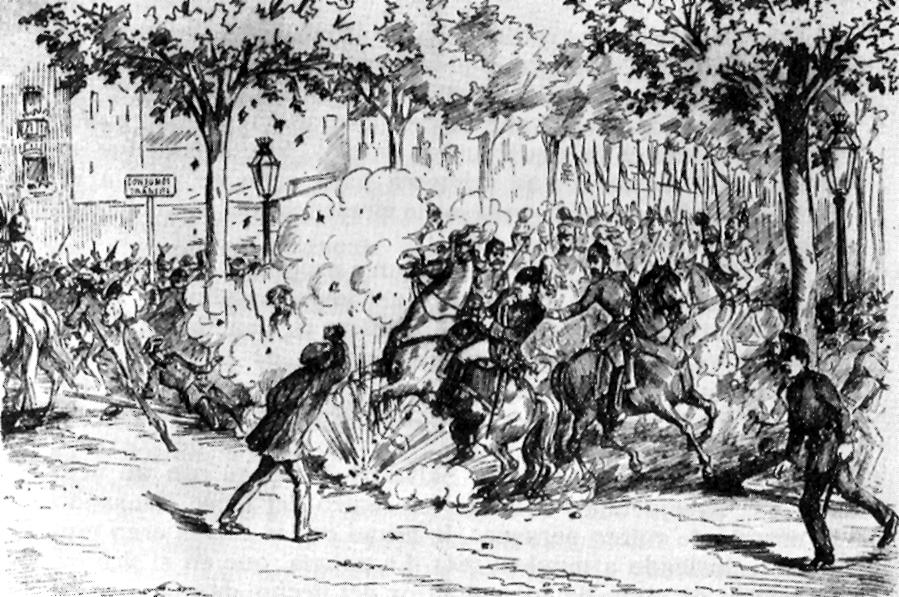
- Contemporaneous illustration of the attack
- Location: 41°22′N 2°08′E; Barcelona, Spain
- Date: 24 September 1893
- Target: Arsenio Martínez Campos
- Weapon: Two bombs
- Deaths: 2
- Injuries: 16
- Assailant: Paulí Pallàs

On 24 September 1893, the anarchist Paulí Pallàs attempted to assassinate Captain General of Catalonia Arsenio Martínez Campos during a military parade in Barcelona. The attackers' two bombs missed their target and only slightly injured the general but seriously injured over a dozen others, with two deaths. The attacker, who did not attempt to flee, was arrested, sentenced to death and executed two weeks later. In his trial, he said he sought to avenge the executions of the anarchists killed following the prior year's Jerez uprising. The attack on Martínez Campos precipitated a series of reprisals that culminated in the assassination of Spanish Prime Minister Cánovas del Castillo in 1897.

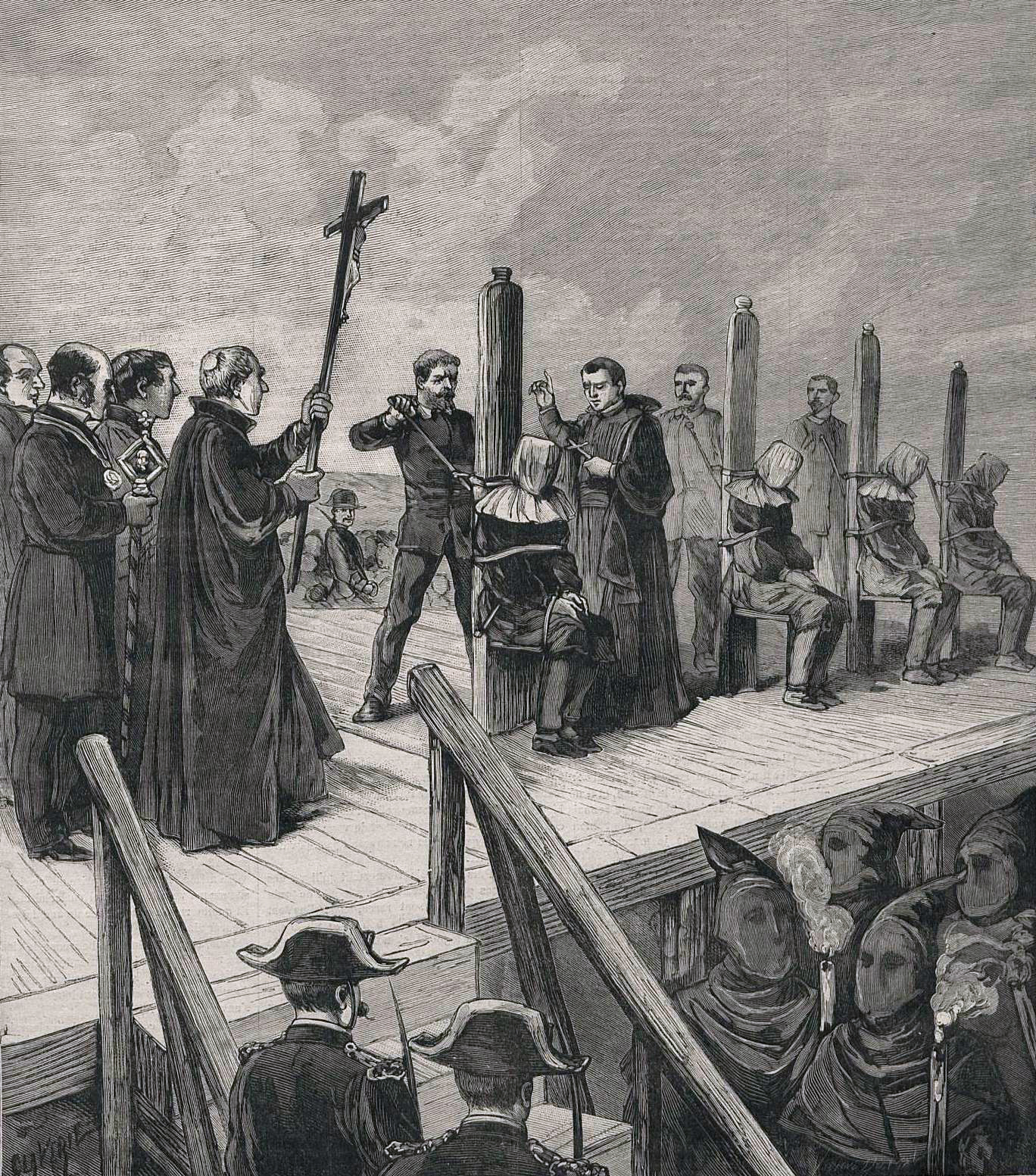
Anarchists condemned to death in Jerez

== Bibliography ==
- Avilés Farré, Juan (2013). La Daga y la dinamita: los anarquistas y el nacimiento del terrorismo (in Spanish). Barcelona: Tusquets. ISBN 978-84-8383-753-5. OCLC 892212465.
- Dardé, Carlos (1996). La Restauración, 1875–1902: Alfonso XII y la regencia de María Cristina (in Spanish). Madrid: Historia 16-Temas de Hoy. ISBN 978-84-7679-317-6.
- Suárez Cortina, Manuel [in Spanish] (2006). La España Liberal (1868–1917): política y sociedad (in Spanish). Madrid: Síntesis. ISBN 978-84-9756-415-1.
