= Political organisation =

Group involved with politics

A political organisation is any organisation whose primary purpose is involving itself in the political process, including political parties, non-governmental organisations, and special interest advocacy groups. Political organisations are those engaged in political activities (e.g., lobbying, community organizing, campaign advertising, etc.) aimed at achieving clearly defined political goals, which typically benefit the interests of their members.

While parties are one type of political organisation that may engage in some or all of those activities, they are distinct in that they typically focus on supporting candidates for public office, winning elections and controlling government.

== Political parties ==
The most well-known type of political organisation is the political party. Political parties are directly involved in the political processes of countries with party systems, of which there are several types.

Some of the most common types are multi-party systems, single party systems, and two party systems.

=== Multi-party systems ===
In multi-party systems such as India, Pakistan, etc., there is no restriction on the number of parties allowed to be in operation at any given time. Under these types of systems, people are free to participate in the political process both through elections and by forming their own political parties as they please.

Examples of multi-party systems are:

- Armenia
- Bangladesh
- Canada
- France
- Germany
- India
- Italy
- Pakistan
- Philippines
- South Africa
- Taiwan

=== Single-party systems ===
In single-party systems, one political party exercises control over the government. Unlike under other systems, single-party systems do not necessarily extend democratic privileges to the citizens. This means that citizens have little say regarding political subjects.

Examples of single-party systems are:

- China
- Cuba
- Laos
- North Korea
- Vietnam

=== Two-party systems ===
Two-party systems are similar to multi-party systems in that power is not concentrated in one party and that parties have to consider the opinion of the general public in order to retain power by winning elections. Most two-party systems are technically multiparty systems but all power is effectively concentrated amongst two parties or coalitions.

Examples of two-party systems are:

- Australia
- Malta
- Nepal
- United Kingdom
- United States

== Party coalitions ==
Another type of political organisation is the party coalition. A party coalition is a group of political parties operating together in parliament. Oftentimes, party coalitions are formed after elections have taken place and no party has clearly won a majority seat in parliament (e.g. the AAP-Congress Government in Delhi). Other coalitions are formed prior to elections and are effectively agreements between two or more parties to run jointly in elections and to pursue similar agendas (e.g. the National Democratic Alliance in India, and the Liberal/National Coalition in Australia). The electoral thresholds for multi-party alliances are set differently in many countries depending on the number of parties.

== Parliamentary groups or Caucus ==
Parliamentary groups are groups of some members of the same political party or electoral fusion of parties, also called caucus in the United States Congress and the Parliament of Canada.

== Technical group ==
A technical group or mixed group is a heterogenous parliamentary group composed of elected officials from political parties of differing ideologies (or independent of any party) who are not numerous enough to form groups on their own.

== Political group ==
A political group is a group composed of multiple political parties or independents of aligned ideologies.

== Labour unions ==
A labour union (or trade union) is a political organisation formed to promote the interests of workers.

Labour unions have various roles in modern politics, including:

- Organizing strike actions and general strikes
- Negotiating with employers on behalf of workers
- Ensuring that workers are not fired without severance pay
- Assuring that workers receive reasonable salaries

Unlike other political organisations, labor unions do not directly participate in elections, although they may campaign for parties and politicians supporting their positions. Labour unionisation is a way for workers to maintain unity and preserve their rights. Often, major corporations antagonise the principle of labor unionisation since it results in heavier employment regulations which restrict the powers of big business to fire workers at will, effectively causing economic difficulties for such companies.

== See also ==
- Lobby group
- International organisation
- Governmental organisation
