= Paulí Pallàs =

Spanish anarchist and typesetter

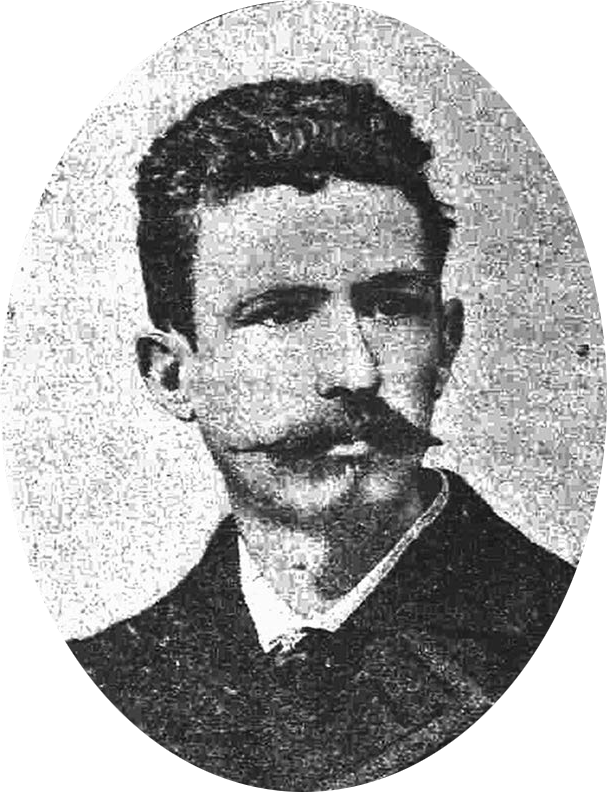
- Born: Paulí Pallàs i Latorre; 1 December 1862; Cambrils, Baix Camp, Catalonia
- Died: 6 October 1893 (aged 30); Barcelona, Catalonia
- Known for: Assassination attempt on general Arsenio Martínez Campos
- Movement: Anarchism in Spain

Paulí Pallàs i Latorre (1 December 1862 – 6 October 1893) was a Catalan anarchist and typesetter who carried out an unsuccessful assassination attempt against Arsenio Martínez Campos, the Captain General of Catalonia.

== Biography ==
Paulí Pallàs was born in 1862 in the small coastal village of Cambrils, in the province of Tarragona. He worked in typography and lithography, but struggled to find stable jobs. To support himself financially, he sang in the choir for performances of the opera Les Huguenots at the Great Lyceum Theatre in Barcelona. By the late 1880s, Pallàs had gravitated towards an authoritarian socialist political philosophy. Around this time, he and his family moved to Argentina, where he sought stable employment.

He first settled in Buenos Aires, before moving to Rosario, where he became immersed in Argentine radical politics. He frequented discussion groups and soon became known as an orator, giving speeches at demonstrations on International Workers' Day. In the early 1890s, he met the Italian anarchist Errico Malatesta, who inspired him to become an anarchist communist. He then moved to Brazil and settled in São Paulo, where he unsuccessfully attempted to get a job at an Italian cafe, before moving on to Rio de Janeiro. In May 1892, he allegedly threw a bomb into the city's Alcantara Theater.

In the spring of 1892, after the death of his father in law, Pallàs and his family returned to Barcelona. With their inheritance, they opened up a textiles shop. Pallàs left the enterprise to return to work in printing, but he was dismissed over his political activism. That summer, he briefly moved to Paris, where he was swept up in the commotion around the trial and execution of the French anarchist Ravachol. Upon his return to Catalonia, he established an anarchist publication called Ravachol in Sabadell. He and his wife Àngela spent most of their time working, making clothes with Singer sewing machines. According to his neighbours at the time, he rarely spoke about politics; even his wife did not know about his anarchist ideas.

Pallàs unsuccessfully attempted to assassinate Arsenio Martínez Campos, the Captain General of Catalonia. Martínez Campos had been responsible for violently repressing the January 1892 Jerez uprising and execution of four Jerez anarchists. In revenge, on 24 September 1893, Pallás threw two bombs at Martínez Campos, but missed and killed at least two bystanders. Martínez Campos suffered minor injuries. Pallàs did not seek to escape. After being tried by a court martial, Pallás was executed by firing squad on 6 October 1893. His final words were, "The vengeance will be terrible." A month later, his friend would avenge Pallás's death with the Liceu bombing, killing over a dozen.

== Bibliography ==
- Bray, Mark (2022). The Anarchist Inquisition: Assassins, Activists, and Martyrs in Spain and France. Cornell University Press. ISBN 9781501761928. LCCN 2021038606.
- Falk, Candace, ed. (2003). Emma Goldman: A Documentary History of the American Years; Volume One: Made for America, 1890–1901. Berkeley: University of California Press. ISBN 978-0-520-08670-8.
- Tone, John Lawrence (2006). War and Genocide in Cuba, 1895-1898. University of North Carolina Press. p. 230. ISBN 978-0-8078-3006-2.
