= Jerez uprising =

1892 peasant rebellion in Jerez, Spain

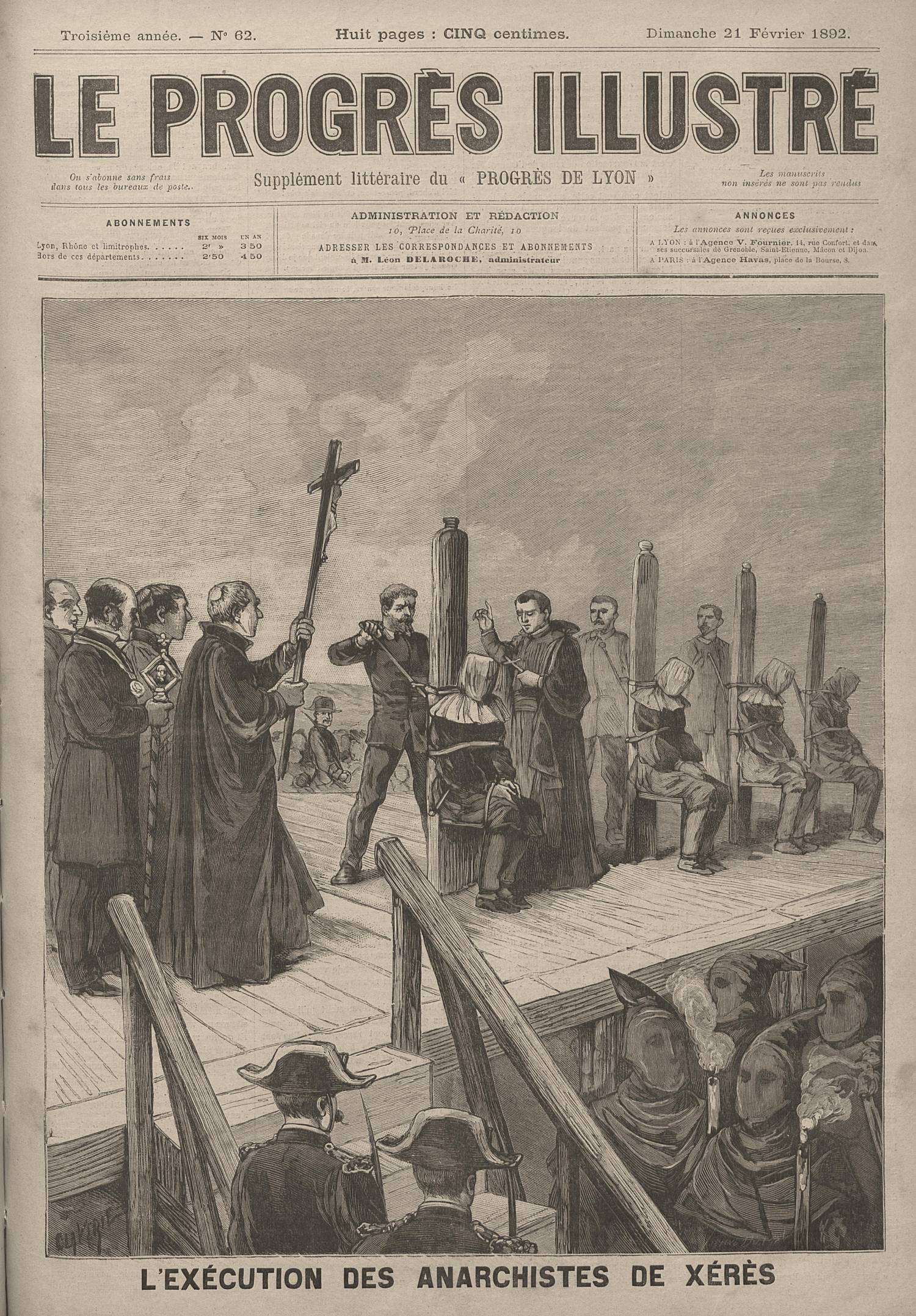
Execution of 4 of the accused for the uprising

The Jerez uprising was an 1892 peasant rebellion in Jerez, Spain. While the event itself was unexceptional amid the regional history of rebellions, the disproportionate repression following the uprising resulted in a series of protests and retaliatory bombings throughout the remainder of the decade. The uprising consisted of 500 to 600 fieldworkers who marched into Jerez with their farm equipment and demands of prisoner release and economic relief. They were shut down within hours, leaving three dead. The Spanish Civil Guard detained 315 fieldworkers, anarchists, and labor organizers from the countryside. They focused on quelling anarchism in the region, though the role of anarchism in the uprising itself has been the subject of inconclusive historiographical debate.

After several military tribunals with 54 defendants, four were executed for sedition and murder, 14 received life sentences, and seven received sentences less than 20 years. Independent and liberal newspapers condemned the severity of the response as both disproportionate and insufficient for addressing the desperation that caused the uprising. The anarchist press, which had been targeted in the repression, took an even harder line and portended acts of retribution. Following the executions, there were protests throughout Spain and at Spanish consulates across Europe. Attacks continued throughout the year including bombings attempted and actualized. Anarchist Paulí Pallàs was executed following his 1893 attempted assassination of a military general involved in the repression and executions, leading to a series of retributive bombings throughout the 1890s.

== Background ==
The rural Andalusian region of Spain had a history of peasant rebellions stretching back to the 1850s and continuing in southern Spain into the 20th century. By 1870, the revolts began to associate with the anarchist movement and the Spanish Chapter of the First International (FRE-AIT), but the causal connection between anarchism and rural rebellion is contested.

== Attack ==
The night of 8 January 1892, between 500 and 600 fieldworkers (campesinos) entered Jerez with their agricultural tools to spark a rebellion. While the uprising had no particular motivating factor, their demands included the release of prisoners and changes to regional economic circumstances. The uprising was suppressed within hours after receiving no support from the townspeople and military. Three people were killed: a tax official and a wine salesman, who were mobbed for their bourgeois associations, and a Cuban army soldier, who was shot by mistake.

The case of anarchist association with the Jerez uprising has been a longstanding historiographical debate. The Jerez fieldworkers included some anarchists but were not anarchists in their entirety. The group had concrete demands based on their living conditions, and were not possessed by a collective urge for destruction. Historian James Michael Yeoman writes that some participants' desire for revolution was as much a factor as the rain that night that kept potential participants at home. While the resulting popular violence is associated with anarchism, where ideology and material need coincided, the ideology does not explain its entirety.

== Aftermath ==
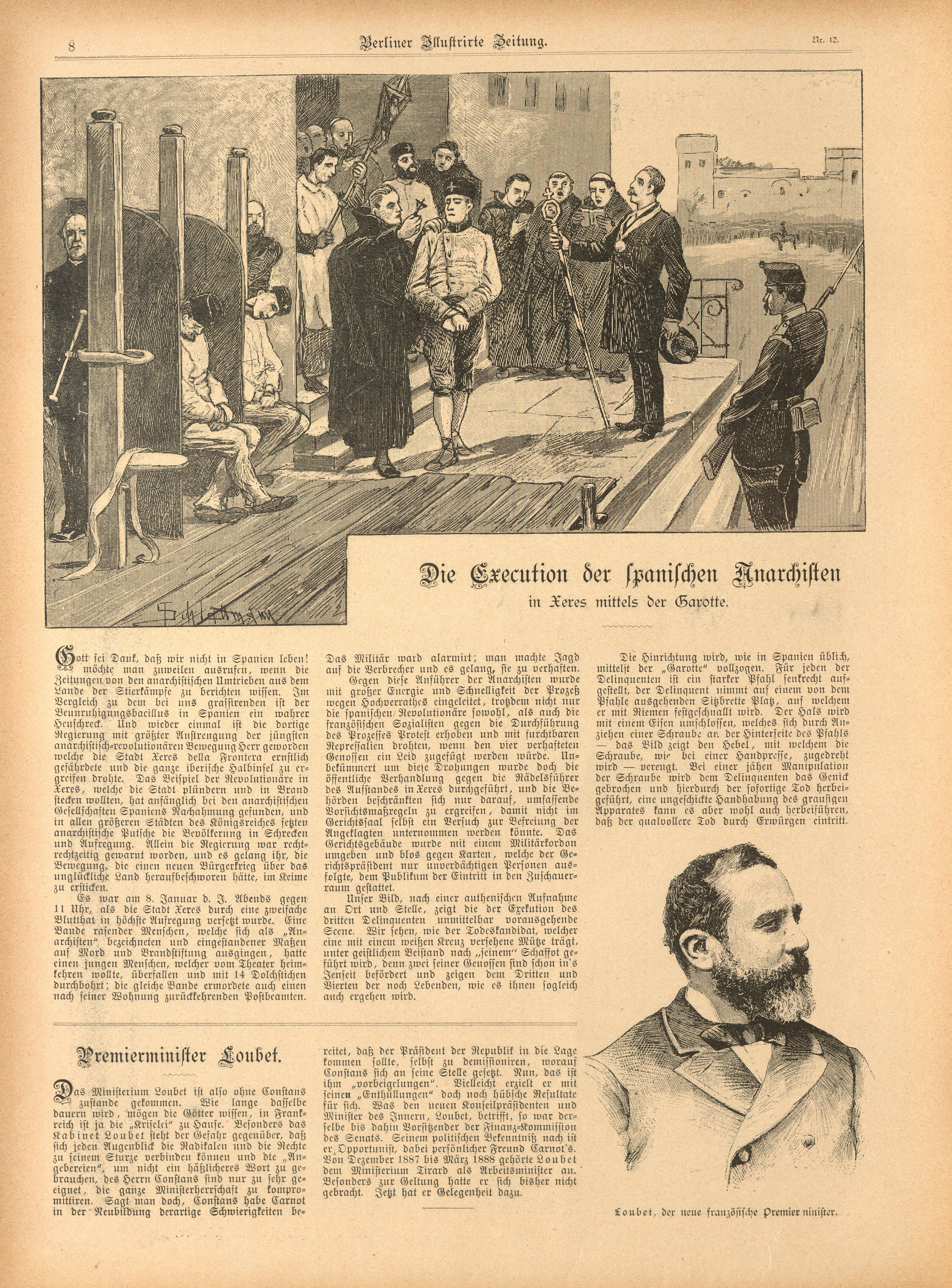
The execution of the Jerez anarchists in the Berliner Illustrierte Zeitung

The repression of the otherwise unexceptional uprising was disproportionately severe. The Cádiz province labor movement was sent underground as its organizations were shuttered, publishing abated, and militants arrested. Local authorities did not question the uprising's connection to the anarchist movement. Tasked with restoring order, the army strongly repressed what it considered a military insurrection. The Spanish Civil Guard gathered anarchists and labor activists from the countryside over months, prioritizing the authors and distributors of the anarchist press, which it considered the key vehicle for transmitting ideas of revolt with the working class. At trial, the ability to identify issues of the anarchist press was treated as incriminating. A total of 315 detainees from this period were mostly fieldworkers who identified as anarchists.

The regional repression outpaced the anarchist press' ability to report on the uprising, leading anarchists to rely on official and mainstream reporting. Some anarchist papers followed the official reports of the uprising as revolutionary violence, the type of spontaneous and inevitable reaction to debilitating regional poverty. The Seville anarchist paper La Tribuna Libre was suppressed after affirming its support for subsequent revolutionary action. More often, anarchist papers denied the uprising's affiliation with anarchism yet did not decry it. Le Corsair of A Coruña justified the fieldworkers' rage as the result of farm owner exploitation and the impropriety of the 1882 Mano Negra affair. The publication condemned the "bourgeois press" as using the opportunity to defame anarchism. The largest Spanish, non-Catalan anarchist newspaper, La Anarquía, doubted the uprising's revolutionary potential as either a political or social revolution based on its organization and location. All refuted the mainstream claim that anarchists had sparked the uprising, whether to avoid press censorship or because anarchists believed that anarchist revolutions would not have leaders, only instructional propaganda.

The first trial—two military tribunals on charges of sedition and murder—was held a month after the uprising, in February. The main evidence came through an informant and forced confessions. Of the eight on trial, four were executed by garrote on 10 February 1892: self-declared anarchists Antonio Zarzuela and Jesús Fernández Lamela for starting the uprising, and Manuel Fernández Reina and Manuel Silva Leal for the murder of Manuel Castro Palomino. Four more were given life sentences: one who died in his cell on the day of the executions, two who denied being anarchists, and the informant. Another trial later in 1892 had 46 defendants, of which ten received life sentences and seven received sentences between 8 and 20 years. Two who were accused of visiting Fermín Salvochea in prison to plan the uprising received life sentences. Salvochea, who was in prison during the uprising, received a 12-year sentence.

Independent and liberal newspapers condemned the severity of the government's response. The hunger and deprivation that sparked the uprising, El Heraldo de Madrid wrote, would be better quelled through knowledge than violence. Madrid's republican La Justica acknowledged the "anarchists" as culpable but considered tribunal response an overreaction, both an "abominable crime" and a "political blunder", exacerbated by governmental and press pressure.

The roiled anarchist press reflected the anger of the international movement and portended acts of retribution. They referenced a cycle of violence in which the desperation contemporary society had caused the uprising and the choice to respond by killing workers would only further aggravate relations and prompt hatred. The protests and attacks immediately following the executions persisted through the year. The Spanish consulates of Europe saw protests and clashes with police. There were protests across Spain, especially in Barcelona. An explosion in its Royal Square killed a bystander and wounded others. There was a bombing attempt on the Cortes parliament building in Madrid. Anarcho-communist newspapers of Catalonia both encouraged and celebrated these attacks, while the anarcho-communist newspapers outside Catalonia were more pacifying or distancing, instead blaming attacks on police.

Anarchist Paulí Pallàs would later attempt to assassinate Catalonia Captain General Arsenio Martínez Campos for the latter's role in the Jerez uprising's repression and executions. The September 1893 assassination attempt was unsuccessful and resulted in Pallàs's execution, and a spate of Spanish bombings throughout the 1890s.

== Bibliography ==
- Kaplan, Temma (2015). "We the Workers of the Fields". Anarchists of Andalusia, 1868–1903. Princeton: Princeton University Press. pp. 168–205. ISBN 978-1-4008-6971-8. OCLC 949946764.
- Turcato, Davide (2012). Making Sense of Anarchism: Errico Malatesta's Experiments with Revolution, 1889–1900. Palgrave Macmillan. ISBN 978-1-349-33736-1.
- Yeoman, James Michael (2019). "The Jerez Uprising". Print Culture and the Formation of the Anarchist Movement in Spain, 1890–1915. Routledge. ISBN 978-1-00-071215-5.
