= José Prat (anarchist) =

Catalan anarcho-syndicalist theoretician (1886–1932)

Josep Prat
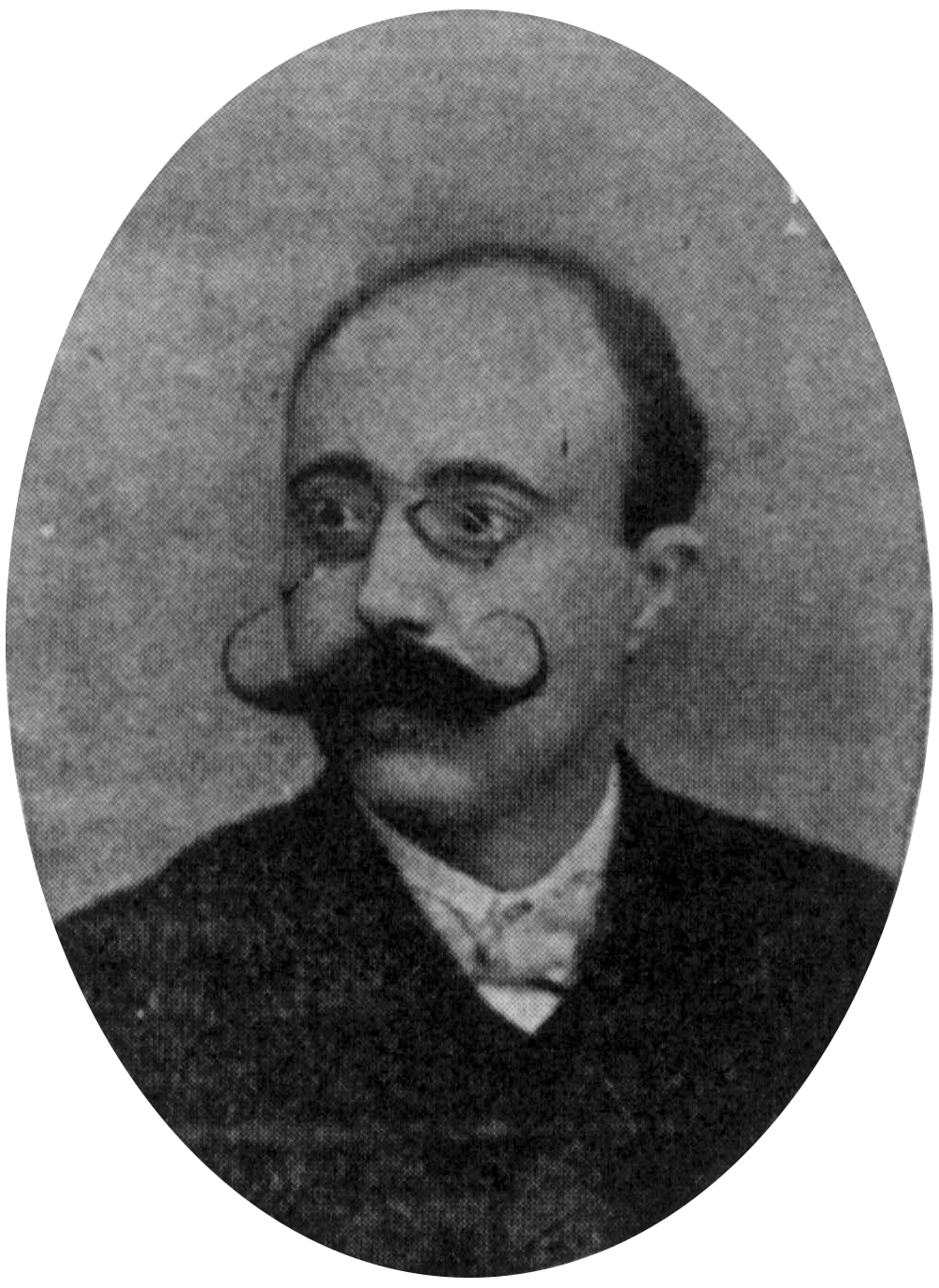
- Prat in 1909
- Born: Josep Prat i Rogent; 17 December 1866; Barcelona, Spain
- Died: 17 July 1932 (aged 65); Barcelona, Catalonia, Spain
- Movement: Anarchism in Spain

Josep Prat i Rogent (Note: Also known by the Spanish: José Prat.) (1886–1932) was a Catalan anarcho-syndicalist writer and theoretician.

== Biography ==
Josep Prat i Rogent was born in Barcelona on 17 December 1866. Initially a federal republican, by 1890, he had converted to the philosophy of anarchism. Prat joined a new generation of anarchist intellectuals, which contributed to the growth of the Spanish anarchist movement. He became a disciple of the Galician anarchist Ricardo Mella. He was a shy figure and rarely spoke in meetings, instead developing his talents as a writer. In 1894, Prat began contributing to La Idea Libre, a journal which published anarchist theory.

In the 1896 Barcelona Corpus Christi procession bombing, 6 people were killed and 45 wounded by an unknown attacker. Prat and Mella thought the perpetrator was a "misguided anarchists", but other anarchists thought it to have been an agent provocateur. The subsequent repressions of the Montjuïc trials forced many Spanish anarchists, including Prat, to flee into exile. Prat escaped Barcelona to A Coruña, where he hid at Ricardo Mella's home. Together, they worked on an exposé about the Montjuïc trials, titled La barbarie gubernamental en España, in which they fiercely criticised the actions of the Spanish government. Prat then went into exile in the United Kingdom, where he represented Spanish anarchists at the 1896 International Socialist Workers and Trade Union Congress in London. He then moved on to Argentina and collaborated on Antoni Pellicer's newspaper La Protesta Humana, in which he condemned anarchist terrorism under a pseudonym.

In 1898, Prat returned to Spain and became a leading figure in the anarchist movement. He found that the repressions had frightened many modernist artists away from the anarchist movement, so he criticised them for their apoliticism. When the Generation of '98 introduced individualist anarchism to the Spanish anarchist movement, Prat also criticised it, regarding it to be an illegitimate strain of anarchism. Together with Anselmo Lorenzo, Prat became one of the leading theoreticians of anarcho-syndicalism. He stressed the need to build strong trade unions through localised industrial actions before carrying out a revolutionary general strike, and criticised the lack of enthusiasm among anarchist activists between 1900 and 1903.

By this time, Prat was recognised as one of the most seasoned anarchist theoreticians of his time, alongside Joan Montseny. From October 1903 to September 1905, Prat published the bi-monthly magazine Natura, which published works by anarchists from throughout Europe. In 1906, Prat began translating works about syndicalism. He translated titles including Enrique Leone's El sindicalismo and Luis Fabbri's Anarquismo y socialismo. In 1908 and 1909, he published harsh critiques of reformist socialism and the Socialist International (IS), which he denounced as "bourgeois", in a series of article in Solidaridad Obrera. In the anarchist publication Tierra y Libertad, he pressed the trade union Workers' Solidarity (SO) to break away from the leadership of the Spanish Socialist Workers' Party (PSOE) and to instead take a revolutionary anarchist stance of direct action and class conflict.

By 1910, Prat's anarcho-syndicalist theories had been taken up by the SO, which was reorganised into the National Confederation of Labour (CNT). His view that trade union strength needed to be built up through localised industrial actions before declaring a general strike was taken up by the Sabadell Labour Federation (FOS), although during the first years of the 1910s, other sections of the CNT frequently declared general strikes at every opportunity. Prat also argued that a revolutionary general strike could only be successful if the peasantry was incorporated into the trade union movement.

Prat died in Barcelona on 17 July 1932.

== Selected works ==
- A las mujeres (Barcelona, 1904)
- Necesidad de asociación (Barcelona, 1904)
- La burguesia y el proletariado (Valencia, 1909)
- Sindicalismo y Socialismo (A Coruña, 1912)
- Orientaciones (Barcelona, 1916)

== Bibliography ==
- "Josep Prat i Rogent". Gran enciclopèdia catalana (in Catalan).
- Esenwein, George Richard (1989). Anarchist Ideology and the Working-class Movement in Spain, 1868-1898. University of California Press. ISBN 0-520-06398-8.
- Smith, Angel (2007). Anarchism, Revolution, and Reaction: Catalan Labour and the Crisis of the Spanish State, 1898–1923. Berghahn Books. ISBN 978-1-84545-176-9.
