= Félix Martí Ibáñez =

Spanish physician, psychiatrist, author, and polymath

Félix Martí-Ibáñez (December 25, 1911 – May 24, 1972) was a physician, psychiatrist, author, and publisher, who was born in Spain, emigrated to the United States in 1939 following the Spanish Civil War when he was exiled during the Franco Era in Spain, and became an American citizen. In Spain he had served as a minister for the Second Spanish Republic. When he emigrated he settled in Manhattan.

He is the author of numerous books, articles, and essays. He founded, edited, and published the highly regarded magazine, MD, through the publishing house he founded in Manhattan, MD Publications, Inc., through which he also published several medical journals during the early 1950s and through which he published many of the books he authored. The layout of the magazine was distinctive for its uninterrupted content and the secondary position given to advertising and, he sometimes implemented novel presentation of information, such as images without captions. Martí-Ibáñez was a polymath with interests in fine art, ancient history, anthropology, architecture, biology, botany, chemistry, civilizations, culture, diplomacy, geography, graphic design, history, human relationships, literature, medicine, music, mythology, natural history, philosophy, psychiatry, psychology, public health, religion, sociology, urban planning, and zoology.

In 1957 he began the publication of MD as its editor-in-chief and continued its publication until his death in 1972. Some of his works written for MD that were published in continuing series on topics such as art, culture, history, medicine, and philosophy became compiled and published later as books.

He also published a similar magazine in Canada, MD of Canada, and another, MD en Español, which was read throughout the Spanish-speaking world. He was a frequent contributor to professional journals in his broad fields of interest, as an author, editor, or co-editor.

In his obituary, the New York Times stated that Martí-Ibáñez also held the chair of the history of medicine at New York Medical College of Flower and Fifth Avenue Hospitals. On a medallion commemorating the founding of MD, he is described as a humanist.

== Personal history ==
Martí-Ibáñez was born in Cartagena into a large and extended family of high culture. His mother, Josefina Ibáñez-De Morel, was an accomplished pianist who taught music. His father, Félix Martí-Alpera, was an educator, a humanist, a classicist, and a scholar who was published frequently, authoring five hundred books. His sister, Josetlna, was awarded a PhD in pharmacology. His family relocated to Barcelona and vacationed in Valencia. He studied medicine in Barcelona and Madrid and was highly influenced by Dr. Gregorio Marañon regarding the delicate relationship between the patient and the physician, and its valuable role as a clinical tool for the physician. He was a pupil and disciple of the philosopher José Ortega y Gasset.

At the age of nineteen, he graduated with his degree in medicine. He then began writing for literary and medical magazines and authored two novels, Yo Rebelde and Aventura. A year later, he was awarded a doctoral degree from the medical school at the University of Madrid. His doctoral thesis was on the history of the psychology and physiology of mystics in India, a comparison of eastern and western philosophy.

He began lecturing throughout the country and was appointed director of public health and social services for Catalonia at the age of twenty-six. Within two years he was appointed as the under-secretary of public health for the entire country. In another two years he was appointed as the director of wartime health education in Catalonia. His county was at war and he encouraged patriotism and peace.

Representing Spain in the World Peace Congresses, he traveled internationally to Europe and North America. While serving as a major in the medical corps of the Spanish Air Force, he was wounded. When Barcelona fell to the armies of Franco on January 26, 1939, he sought refuge in the countryside and was rescued by friends.

Soon he was aided in an escape to the United States in 1939, where he continued his activities with the international peace conferences, participation in medicine and other sciences, and launched his literary career in English. He established his residence in Manhattan, which is where his wife, Josephine, died in February 1966 after a long illness.

He received invitations to speak and lecture from institutions in countries around the world. He became associated with the research departments of two major ethical pharmaceutical companies and, in 1957, launched the magazine, MD, and the publication of his books.

At the age of sixty, Felix Martí-Ibáñez died suddenly of a heart attack on May 24, 1972, in New York City. His funeral Mass was offered at St Patrick's Cathedral. In 1977 sculptor and medallist Joseph Kiselewski was commissioned by MD magazine, upon its 20th anniversary, to create a bronze medallion featuring the profile of Dr. Ibañez.

== Intellectual perspectives ==
Often in the vanguard on intellectual thoughts about medicine, public health, human nature, and psychiatry, in 1955 Martí-Ibáñez wrote his concerns about the indiscriminate use of antibiotics, "Antibiotic therapy, if indiscriminately used, may turn out to be a medicinal flood that temporarily cleans and heals, but ultimately destroys life itself", a prediction of the dire consequences that humans are just beginning to face today due to ill-advised uses of antibiotics in dairy and meat production as well as medical practices. In the 1930s he participated in the enactment of legislation liberating women, and his views on human sexuality are quoted regularly.

Given his contributions to the history of medicine, he is described as the inheritor of the mantle of Henry Sigerist in medical literature.

His literary and philosophical style was so eloquent that he is quoted just as often for his imagery as for the content of his statements. His view on death is one often cited: "Even as a coin attains its full value when it is spent, so life attains its supreme value when one knows how to forfeit it with grace when the time comes." Regarding life, in his, Journey Around Myself, he stated, "there is one priceless thing that I brought back from my trip around the world, one that cost no money and on which I paid no customs duty: humility, a humility born from watching other peoples, other races, struggling bravely and hoping humbly for the simplest things in life" and his assessment for getting the most out of it is, "There is only one way to defeat death—to live fast".

== Publications authored by Félix Martí-Ibáñez ==
A brief list of some publications authored and published by Martí-Ibáñez includes,

- Centaur: Essays on the History of Medical Ideas
- The Epic of Medicine
- To Be a Doctor
- Tales of Philosophy
- Ariel: Essays on the Arts and the History and Philosophy of Medicine
- Men, Molds, and History
- The Crystal Arrow: Essays on Literature, Travel, Art, Love, and the History of Medicine
- Henry Sigerist on the History of Medicine
- The Mirror of the Soul and Other Essays
- The Sociology of Medicine
- All the Wonders We Seek (short stories)
- Waltz and Other Stories
- Illustrated Medical History (A Pictorial History of Medicine)
- The Ship in the Bottle and Other Esseys
- Journey Around Myself

== Publications about Félix Martí-Ibáñez ==
In Félix Martí-Ibáñez – Iberian Daedalus: the man behind the essays, which was published in the Journal of the Royal Society of Medicine, Volume 86, October 1993, Herman Bogdan relates a comprehensive profile of Martí-Ibáñez. A detailed chronology of the life and accomplishments of Martí-Ibáñez is compared to physicians who have held the same ideals of and made similar contributions to various cultures throughout recorded history.
