= Ricardo Mella =

Spanish anarchist writer (1861–1925)

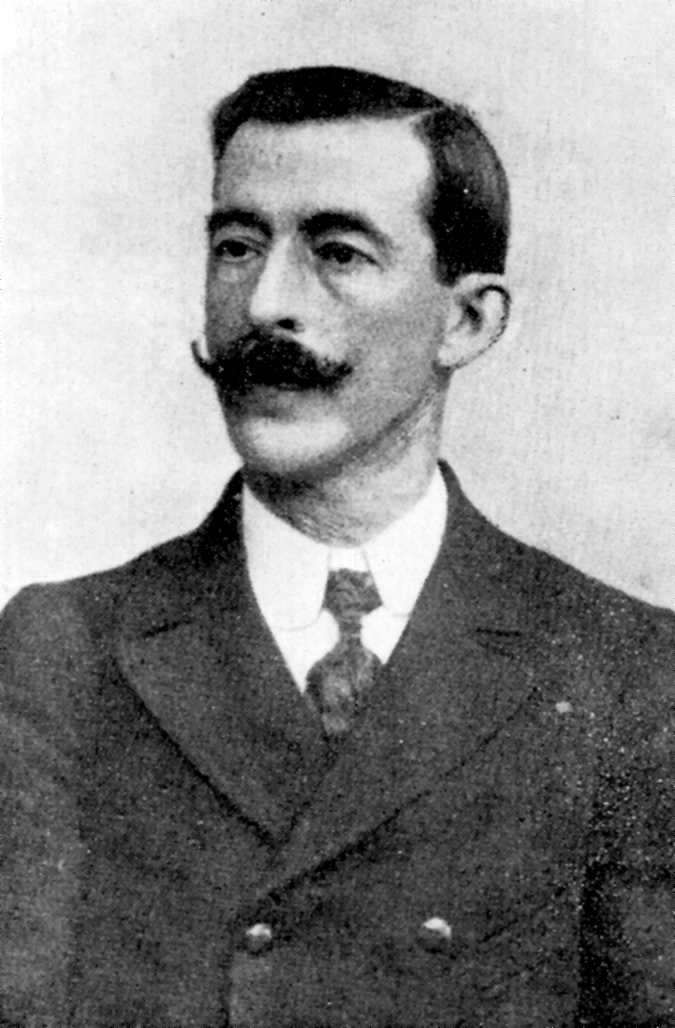
- Ricardo Mella
- Born: 23 April 1861; Vigo, Spain
- Died: 7 August 1925 (aged 64); Vigo, Spain
- Occupations: Writer, pedagogue, surveyor

Ricardo Mella Cea (13 April 1861 – 7 August 1925) was one of the early writers, intellectuals and anarchist activists of the late 19th and early 20th centuries in Spain. He was characterized as an erudite in various subjects and versed in languages, mastering French, English and Italian. Federica Montseny said "He is considered the deepest, most penetrating and most lucid of the Spanish anarchist thinkers". He was the father of feminist activist Urania Mella and socialist politician Ricardo Mella Serrano.

== Biography ==
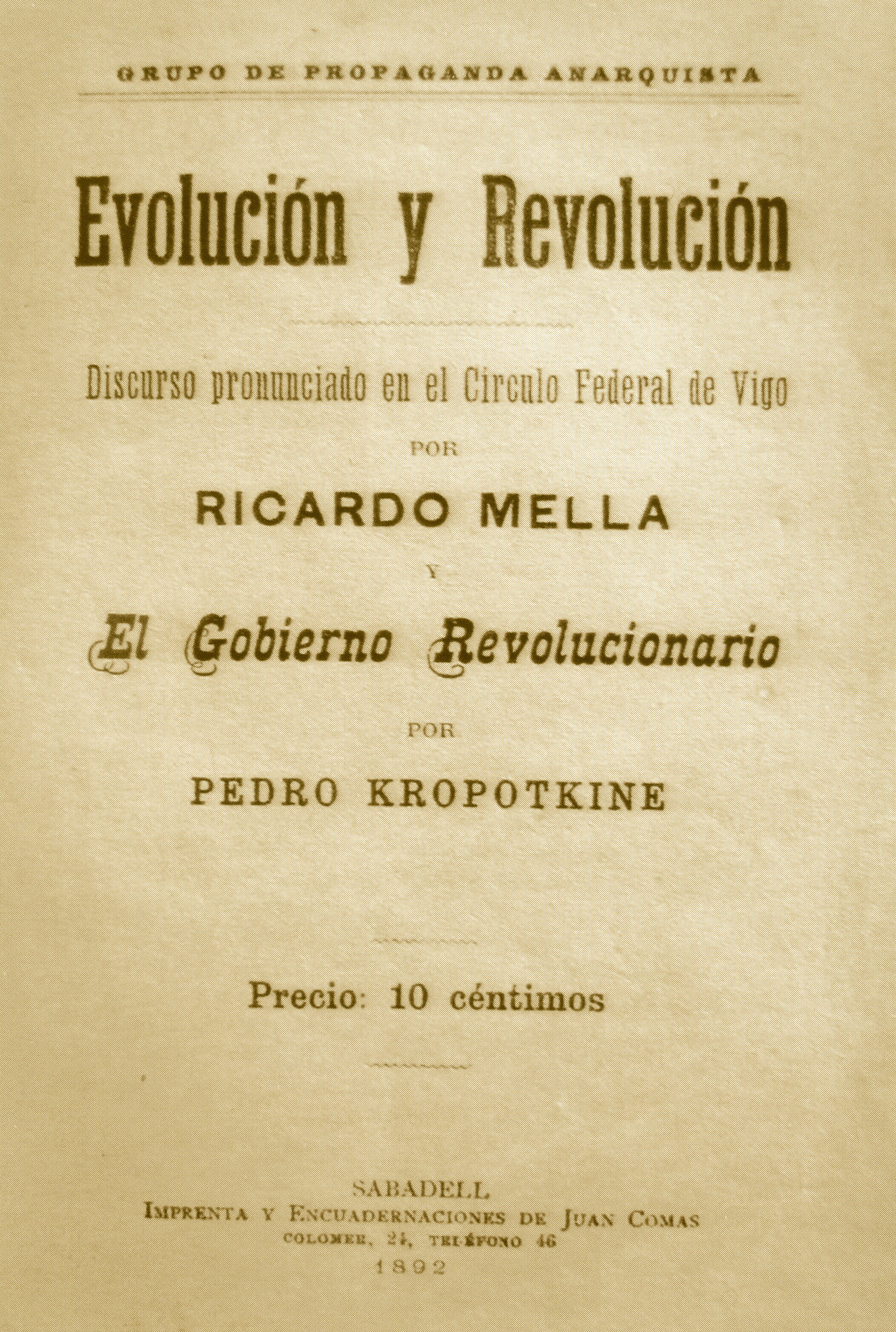
Photo of his speech published in print called "Evolution and Revolution"

Ricardo Mella was born in Gamboa, Vigo, in the province of Pontevedra (Galicia), where he went to primary school. He was the son of Dolores Cea Fernández and José Mella Buján, a hat crafter and a supporter of federal republicanism which influenced his eldest son, Ricardo, on respect for the republican and democratic ideals and admiration for Francisco Pi y Margall. When he was age 16, he joined the Federal Democratic Republican Party of Spain, becoming its secretary, and emphasized in its advocacy of federalist republican status and the political and administrative autonomy of Galicia.

When he was young, he worked in a maritime agency in his native Vigo. By this time, Vigo was experiencing a considerable transformation and expansion as a port city and commercial center, but the poor living conditions in Galicia still required workers to emigrate.

During this time, he began his journalistic profession by collaborating with the bi-weekly periodical La Verdad. Representing the most extreme sector of Republicanism, he wrote frequently on the struggle of the Galician proletariat and denounced what he felt to be despotic policies in the Galician government. The sharp and controversial nature of his writings brought him into conflict with the Marquis José Elduayen, a canovista politician and local representative of the central conservative power under Prime Minister Práxedes Mateo Sagasta. Mella brought to light an alleged embezzlement in the Bank of Spain, of which the Marquis had been director of. In April 1881, Mella was sentenced by the Provincial Court to 4 years and 3 months of exile and a fine of 625 pesetas. The sentence later was commuted to three years and seven months, and the fine was lowered to 200 pesetas.

In 1881 Mella founded La Propaganda in Vigo, a federalist publication with a focus on labor issues that lasted until 1885.

== In exile ==
In 1882, he moved to Madrid as part of his imposed exile and there renewed contact with Juan Serrano. He married Serrano's daughter Esparanza Serrano Rivera, with whom he had 12 children. In 1884, he collaborated with the monthly publication Acracia and the Barcelona Newspaper El Productor to translate Bakunin's God and State into Spanish.

On the advice of his father-in-law, Mella studied topography and moved to Andalusia to work. In Seville, he founded several newspapers, including La Solidaridad in 1888. He attended the 1st and 2nd Socialist Competitions (Reus 1885, Barcelona 1889), entering eight essays, all of which won prizes: "El problema de la emigración en Galicia"; "Diferencias entre el comunismo y el colectivismo"; "La anarquía: su pasado, su presente y su porvenir"; "Breves apuntes sobre las pasiones humanas"; "La nueva utopía (novela imaginaria)"; "El colectivismo: sus fundamentos científicos"; "Organización, agitación, revolución y El crimen de Chicago".

== Return to Galicia ==
In 1895, Mella returned to Vigo. He remained a short time, going to Pontevedra in 1897 to work on the construction of a railroad. There he was in close contact with the editors of La Unión Republicana and wrote for El Progresso in Madrid and El Corsario in A Coruña. He denounced the execution of anarchists in Montjuic and began his task of spreading anarchism among the Galician peasantry. At the same time, he collaborated with the periodicals La Revista Blanca, La Anarquía y La Idea Libre in Madrid, El Despertar in New York, and the magazines Ciencia Social in Barcelona and Buenos Aires, La Questione Sociale in Buenos Aires, and L'Humanite Nouvelle in Paris. In 1896, he published the book Lombroso y los anarquistas (Barcelona, 1896), in which he criticizes the theories of criminologist Cesare Lombroso. Around the same time, he published Los sucesos de Jerez (Barcelona, 1893), La barbarie gubernamental en España (Brooklyn, 1897), La ley del número (Vigo, 1899), La cooperación libre y los sistemas de comunidad, Del amor, modo de acción y finalidad social (Barcelona, 1900), Táctica socialista (Madrid, 1900) y La coacción moral (1901).

== Legacy ==
Mella wrote more than 30 essays throughout his life. Some of his writings received international awards and were translated into Italian, Dutch, Portuguese, English, and French. He collaborated with numerous periodicals in many countries.

Key anarcho-syndicalist beliefs of the CNT in its early years came from Mella's writings. Foremost among these were three basic precepts:

1. All people are in need of physical and mental development, indefinite in degree and form.
2. All people have the right to freely satisfy this need for development.
3. All people can satisfy this need through voluntary cooperation or community.

== Works ==
=== Articles and essays ===
- El problema de la emigración en Galicia. Monografía.
- Diferencias entre el comunismo y el colectivismo. Monografía.
- La reacción en la revolución. Artículo publicado en la revista Acracia de Barcelona.
- La Anarquía no admite adjetivos publicado en La Solidaridad.
- La Anarquía: origen progreso, evoluciones, definiciones e importancia actual y futura de éste principio social.
- Breves apuntes sobre las pasiones humanas.
- La nueva utopía.
- El colectivismo.
- Organización, agitación y revolución.
- El crimen de Chicago. Reseña histórica.
- La ley del número. Los dos primeros capítulos de este ensayo sobre la ficción democrática fueron publicados en el número 1 de la revista Ciencia Social de Barcelona, correspondiente a octubre de 1895, bajo el título Las mayorías. La primera edición del texto en su totalidad fue impresa en 1899 en la Imprenta Cerdeira y Fariña, de Vigo. Posteriormente, una versión con algunas modificaciones hechas por Mella fue publicada en un tomo titulado Cuestiones Sociales, donde se recopilaban también otros textos del mismo autor.
- A los campesinos.
- En defensa de la anarquía.
- Doctrina y combate.

=== Books ===
- Lombroso y los anarquistas Edicions Xerais. ISBN 84-8302-398-9.
- Plumazos. Reunión de artículos.
- Ideario con prólogo de José Prat.

=== Translations ===
- God and the State by Mikhail Bakunin
- La anarquía by Errico Malatesta. Existen numerosas reediciones de esta traducción; por ejemplo: E. Malatesta, La anarquía y el método del anarquismo. Premià Editora - La Nave de los Locos, México, 1978. ISBN 968-434-009-5.
- La ciencia moderna y el anarquismo de Piotr Kropotkin.

== See also ==
- Urania Mella Serrano
