= Solidaridad Obrera (periodical) =

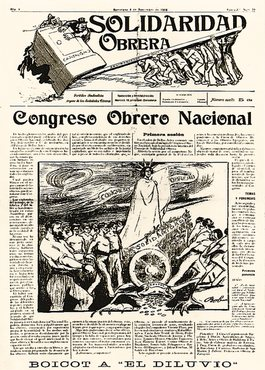
- Front page of the 4 November 1910 issue
- Type: Daily newspaper
- Format: Broadsheet
- Owner: Collective ownership
- Founded: 19 July 1907; 119 years ago
- Political alignment: Far left
- Language: Spanish, Catalan
- Headquarters: Barcelona, Catalonia
- Country: Spain
- Website: solidaridadobrera.org

Solidaridad Obrera (Spanish for Workers' Solidarity) is a newspaper, published by the Catalan/Balearic regional section of the anarchist labor union Confederación Nacional del Trabajo (CNT), and mouthpiece of the CNT in Spain.

The paper takes its name from an organization of the same name that started in 1907 and reorganized the labor movement in Spain based on the structure of the Federación de Trabajadores de la Región Española (FTRE). This name has been used by numerous anarchist periodicals in several countries.

The newspaper Solidaridad Obrera was first published on 19 October 1907, in Barcelona, Catalonia (Spain) as the mouthpiece of the Solidaridad Obrera federation and has been published, in different forms up to today, now consisting of an online version as well as a print-version that has a print-run of 5,000 copies that have been distributed for free since 2005.

== History ==
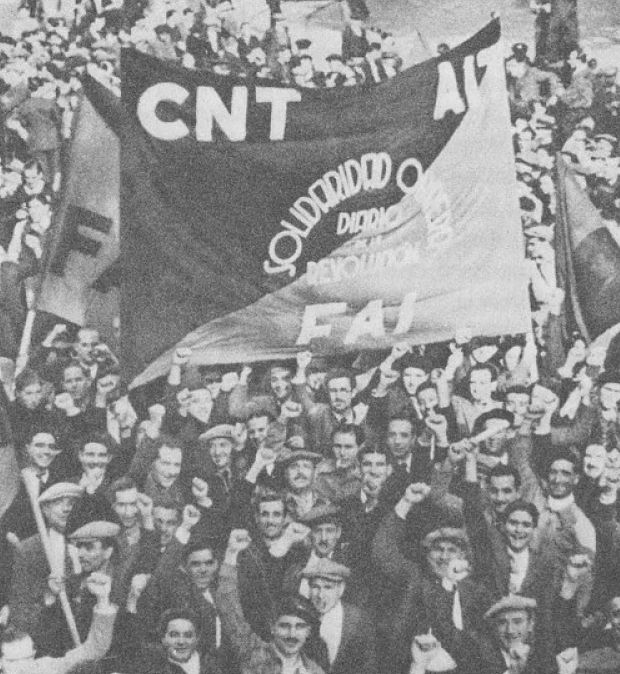
Demonstration in Barcelona, workers hold a banner reading, "Solidaridad Obrera," the anarchist newspaper, 1936-1937

The paper was first established by Anselmo Lorenzo, Ricardo Mella, and José Prat among others. It has been alleged that Francisco Ferrer provided economic support, though nothing conclusive has been proven.

Throughout its history, Solidaridad Obrera has had troubles with the authorities. Publication was suspended on 30 November 1907, but resumed the following February. In 1918, following a major recruitment drive by the CNT, the government shut down publication for a brief period. In 1919, publication was moved to Valencia from Barcelona, though it was moved back to Barcelona in 1923, only to be banned the following year by Prime Minister Miguel Primo de Rivera. After de Rivera stepped down, the Second Spanish Republic was founded, and the paper resumed publication on 31 August 1930 with economic help from anarchists of Manresa, Spain, and their own printing press. At this time the paper was being edited by Joan Peiró, and had a press-run of 26,000 copies. In September 1931, the paper took a new direction when it was taken over by members of the FAI, after a confrontation between more moderate treintistas and the anarchists of the FAI, going through seven editors in a matter of fourteen months.

The publication ups and downs continued into the Republican period. The paper, along with the CNT, had urged workers to abstain from voting in the election of November 1933. After the confrontation between the treintistas and faistas, the paper was suppressed by the government, publication being suspended for 104 days, and entire press-runs being seized. To counteract this, the title of the paper was shortened to "Solidaridad". Notwithstanding, in 1934, despite having the second-largest circulation of any paper in Catalonia, the paper was regularly suppressed by the government of former CNT defense lawyer Lluis Companys and Joan Selves.

The paper's status as mouthpiece for the CNT was reflected in its pages, as it was the scene of many ideological battles. During the Spanish Civil War the paper's press-run exploded to 220,000 copies, elevating it to the largest circulation newspaper in Spain. But the paper continued to have trouble staying in print. During the war, an editorial appeared in its pages denouncing the Communists. The Communist Commissar for Public Order in Madrid, Cazorla, was particularly criticized, and had the Madrid offices of the paper closed. After the end of the civil war and the victory of the Nationalist faction, the paper was banned by the new Spanish government.

In Francoist Spain, despite its prohibition, the paper appeared occasionally, though clandestinely. From 1945 to 1947, it was published monthly, and later sporadically. When the Francoist State ended with the death of Franco in 1976, the paper began publishing weekly (though sometimes just monthly) as the mouthpiece of the newly legalized CNT of Catalonia, under the editorship of Luís Andrés Edo. In 2005, under the direction of Jordi Exposito, the paper became a free publication, financed with the support of subscribers and donations. In 2007, it became the mouthpiece of the CNT-AIT of Spain, and that of the Catalan/Balearic branch of the CNT.

== Sources ==
- Archer, William. The Life, Trial, and Death of Francisco Ferrer, Moffat, Yard and Co., 1911.
- Bolloten, Burnett. The Spanish Revolution : the Left and the struggle for power during the Civil War, Chapel Hill, University of North Carolina Press, c1979, ISBN 0-8078-1297-8
- Gómez Casas, Juan. Anarchist Organisation: The History of the F.A.I., Black Rose Books Limited, 1986, ISBN 0-920057-38-1
- Jones, Norman. Regionalism and Revolution in Catalonia, in Paul Preston: Revolution and War in Spain, Routledge, 2001, ISBN 0-415-09894-7
- Payne, Stanley G. The Spanish Revolution, Norton, 1970. ISBN 0-297-00124-8
- Thomas, Hugh. The Spanish Civil War, Eyre & Spottiswoode, 1961.
