= Montseny (disambiguation) =

Montseny is a village and municipality in Catalonia.

Montseny may also refer to:

- Montseny Massif, a mountain range in Catalonia
- Federica Montseny (1905—1994), Spanish politician and anarchist
- Juan Montseny Carret (1864—1942), Catalan anarchist
