= Federica Montseny =

Spanish politician, anarchist, intellectual, and writer (1905–1994)

- Frederica Montseny i Mañé
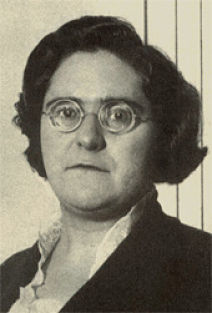

Minister of Health and Social Assistance
- In office 4 November 1936 – 17 May 1937
- Preceded by: Josep Tomàs i Piera
- Succeeded by: Jesús Hernández Tomás (Health); Jaume Aiguader (Social Assistance)

Personal details
- Born: 12 February 1905 Madrid, Spain
- Died: 14 January 1994 (aged 88) Toulouse, France
- Spouse: Josep Esgleas Jaume
- Children: Vida Esgleas Montseny; Germinal Esgleas Montseny; Blanca Esgleas Montseny

Frederica Montseny i Mañé (Catalan: [munˈsɛɲ]; 1905–1994) was a Spanish anarchist and intellectual who was a notable member of the CNT and served as Minister of Health and Social Assistance in the government of the Second Spanish Republic during the Civil War. She is known for being the first woman in Spanish history to be a cabinet minister and one of the first female ministers in Western Europe.

Following the defeat of anarchist forces in the Spanish Civil War, she managed to flee and enter into exile - continuing her anarchist militancy from abroad. Montseny was notably one of the main delegates at the Congress of Carrara (1968), one of the major anarchist congresses of the 20th century, where she represented the FAI.

She was also known as a novelist and essayist. She published about fifty short novels with a romantic-social background aimed specifically at women of the proletarian class, as well as political, ethical, biographical and autobiographical writings (see "García Guirao, Pedro (1988)" in "Further reading" below.)

== Early life ==
Frederica Montseny i Mañé was born on 12 February 1905 in Madrid, Spain. She was the sole surviving child of Joan Montseny and Teresa Mañé, both teachers and anarchists of Catalan extraction. They lived in Madrid because the 1896 Barcelona Corpus Christi procession bombing had led to her father being imprisoned and then exiled. The couple returned to Spain secretly and settled in the capital. From 1898, her parents jointly edited the fortnightly journal La Revista Blanca, one of the most significant anarchist publications of the time. The family put its savings into a house on the outskirts of Madrid. The developer that built the house threatened to sue her father when the latter accused him of stealing from the poor by taking money for houses that were never built. This forced the family to leave and spend the next years moving frequently and surviving occasional writing and farming. During Montseny's childhood, the Civil Guard would frequently visit the family home searching for her father. She would let them in as slowly as possible in order to give him time to hide.

Montseny was educated at home by her parents. After Montseny acquired basic reading and writing skills, her mother used progressive didactic methods to foster Montseny's curiosity, providing her with a wide range of reading material in order to encourage her to pursue her own intellectual interests. Montseny became acquainted with literature as well as social and political theory. She also credits the rural environment she grew up in with shaping her intellectual development. Throughout her life, she would return to nature when grappling with social questions.

== Spanish Civil War and Minister of Health ==
Following the Spanish coup of July 1936, Montseny resolved to support the republican faction against the nationalists, considering a united front of anti-fascists to be necessary for the advancement of anarchism in Spain. Despite her support for the republicans, she quickly came to reject the violence in the republican-held territory, which she described as "a lust for blood inconceivable in honest man before".

In November 1936, Francisco Largo Caballero invited the anarchists to join the Spanish government, as they were the largest of the anti-fascist groups and the other parties of the Popular Front wanted to neutralise their anti-statism. In an interview with Burnett Bolloten, Montseny explained that the principal impulse for the anarchists to join the government was their concern about the rise of the Communist Party to power, which they viewed as a threat to the Revolution. Despite her own misgivings about joining the government, Montseny was appointed as Minister of Health and Social Assistance, becoming the first woman in Spanish history to be a cabinet minister.

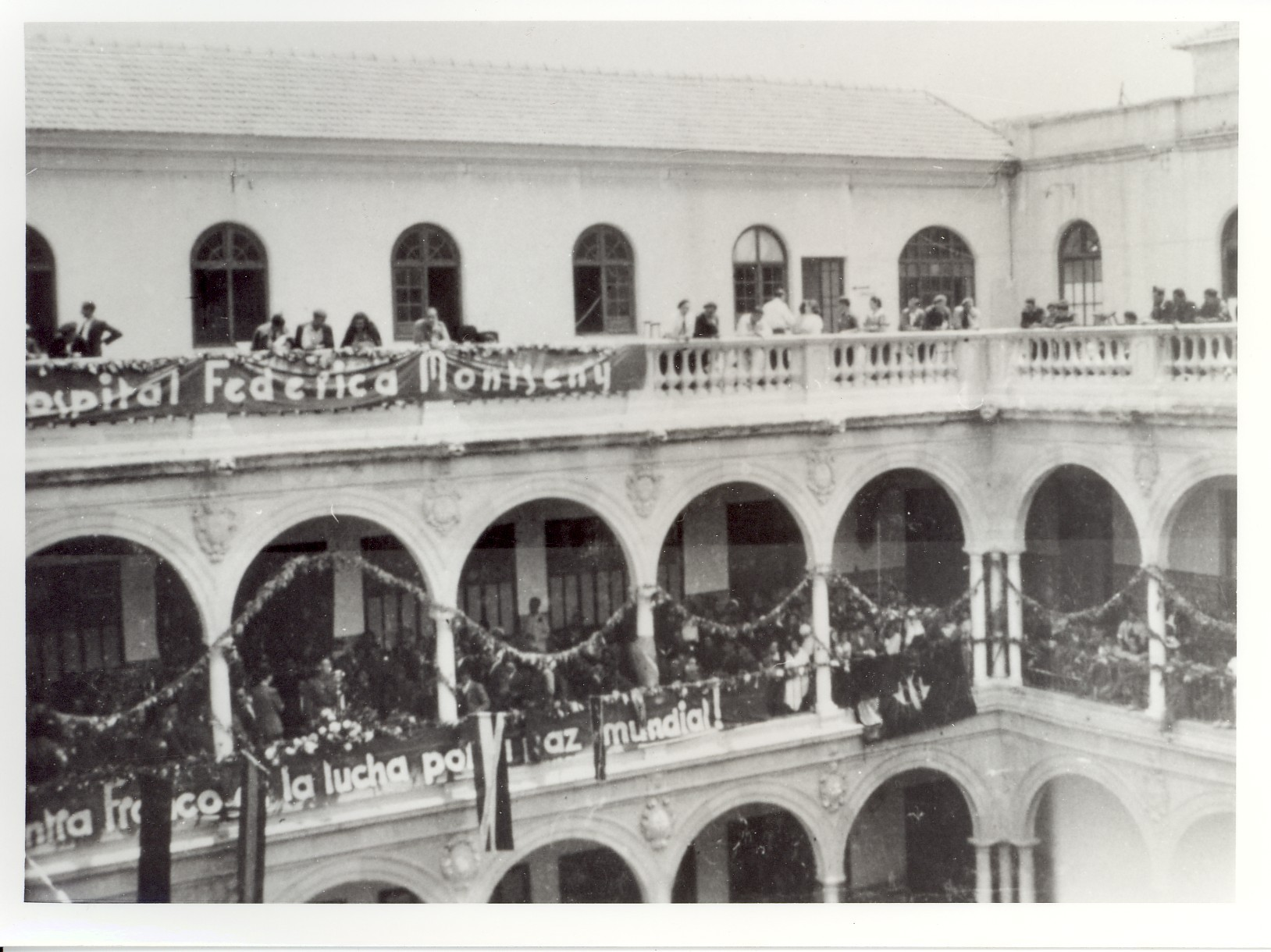
The inauguration of Hospital Federica Montseny in Murcia (1937).

From her ministerial post, Montseny oversaw the country's medical facilities, which had been completely overwhelmed by the conditions of the war, requiring the construction of orphanages and the provision of aid for refugees. She also collaborated with the Mujeres Libres in the advancement of women's rights, carrying out a series of wide-ranging reforms including: the introduction of child care for women in the workforce and the militias; the provision of women's education and healthcare; and the combatting of prostitution in Spain.

Soon after Montseny took office, on 6 November, the republican government moved to Valencia, fearing that Madrid would fall to the nationalist offensive. Montseny persuaded the anarchist militia leader Buenaventura Durruti to transfer from the Aragon front and defend the capital, where he fought and died at the Battle of Ciudad Universitaria. When the anarchists of Barcelona revolted during the May Days, Montseny appealed on behalf of the government for the militias to lay down their arms. But when she was unsuccessful, the government resolved to put down the anarchists by force, in what Montseny described as "the most terrible and bitter days of my life". By the time that Juan Negrin had consolidated power, Montseny considered the war to have already been lost, and thought the only remaining action would be to save as many lives as possible. Montseny subsequently left the cabinet and attempted to continue her efforts in uniting republican forces, but by 1938, the deterioration of the republican front had forced her to increasingly focus on feeding her family.

== Exile ==
In February 1939, Montseny and her family were forced to flee into exile by the nationalist offensive into Catalonia. Her mother died in Perpignan, while her father was imprisoned and her husband was held in an internment camp. She later wrote in her book Pasión y Muerte de los Españoles refugiados en Francia, that the regulations in place in organisations such as the Worker’s Companies were designed to defeat the spirit of the Republican exiles and create a battalion of obedient slaves. Montseny initially relocated to Paris, where she helped in the relocation of Spanish refugees, in spite of her own struggle to make ends meet.

During the Nazi occupation of France, Montseny fled into hiding in Occitania, where she was detained by the authorities of the French State. Although the French authorities had orders to extradite her to Spain, they eventually released Montseny, as she was pregnant with her youngest child.

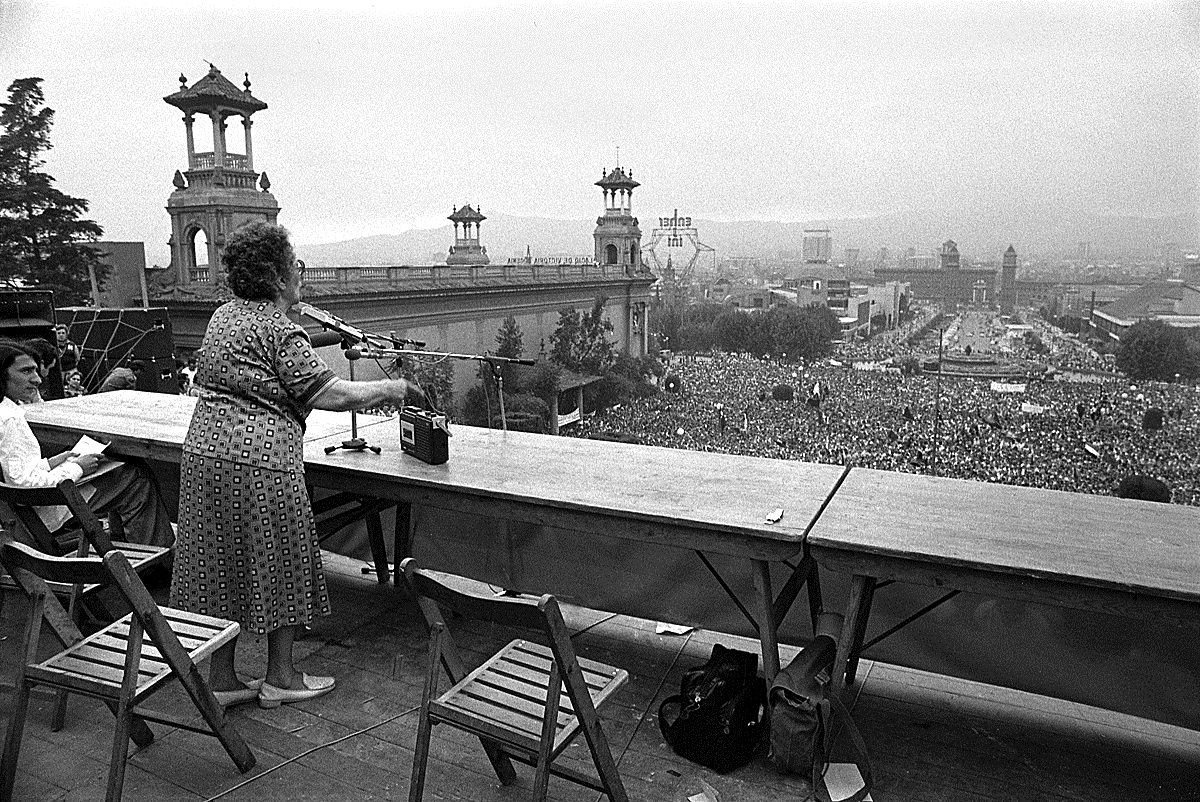
Federica Montseny speaks at the historical meeting of the CNT in Barcelona on 1977, the first one after 36 years of the Francoist State.

In 1942, Montseny and her family attempted to relocate to Mexico, but their route was blocked by the war in North Africa, while both the Allies and Axis prevented any further emigration of Spanish refugees from France, forcing them to stay in Toulouse. Following the liberation of France, Montseny took part in the reorganization of the Confederación Nacional del Trabajo in exile and edited the organization's weekly newspaper. From Toulouse, she also wrote a weekly column in the French language anarchist newspaper Espoir and edited the journal Cénit. In 1968, she was one of the main delegates at the Congress of Carrara, one of the major anarchist congresses of the 20th century - she defended the foundation of the International of Anarchist Federations (IAF) there.

She briefly returned to Spain during the transition to democracy, during which her works were finally being republished. Following the death of her youngest daughter in 1977 and her husband in 1981, Montseny penned an autobiography, which was published in 1987.

Frederica Montseny i Mañé died in Toulouse on 14 January 1994, at the age of 88.

== Personal life ==
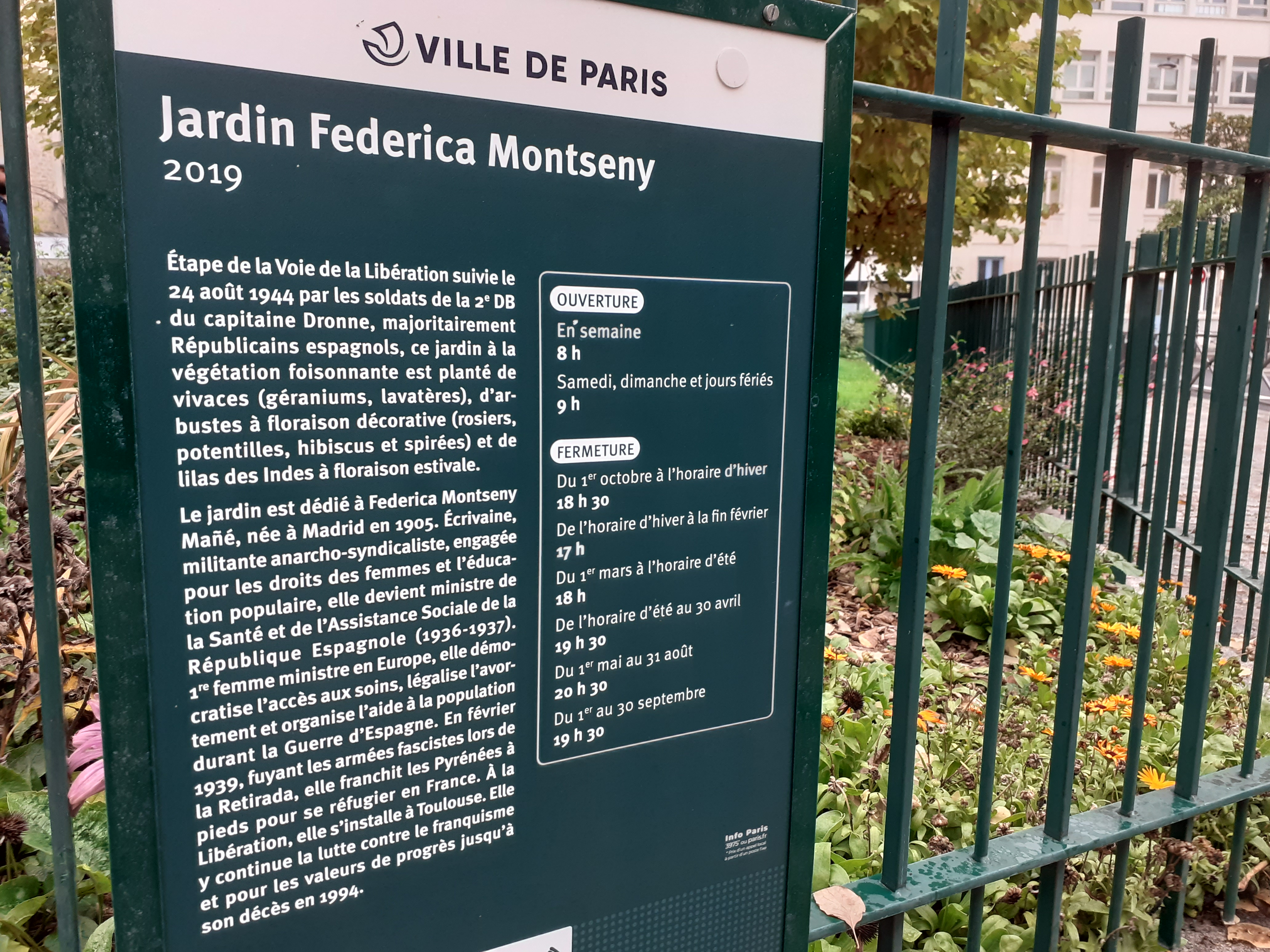
Federica Montseny Park in Paris

In 1930, Montseny began a free love relationship with Germinal Esgleas. The couple had three children together: her eldest daughter Vida was born in 1933; her son Germinal was born in June 1938; and her youngest daughter Blanca was born in 1941. She attempted to raise her daughters to be "free women" and her son to respect women, but when interviewed about this she remarked that she had been largely unsuccessful, due to the strong hold that traditional gender roles still had.

== Federalism ==
"Montseny advocated for a form of federalism consistent with the anarchist principle of decentralization, as practiced by both the CNT and the FAI. In an attempt to reconcile anarchist anti-statism with the state socialism of the UGT, she went so far as to propose federalism as a mechanism for collaboration among the various anti-fascist forces, whereby each territory could organize its own process of socialization without having to follow a single ideological line.

Politically, it is we, the members of the CNT, who have been the first to speak of what we consider a tacit condition for the true democratic structuring of Spain: a federal republic, with autonomous regions federated among themselves, forming a Socialist Republican Federation of Iberia.

== Legacy ==
Several streets, parks and schools are named in her memory in Spain, especially in Catalonia, and in cities like Paris.

== Works ==
=== Novels ===
- Horas trágicas (1920)
- Amor de un día (1920)
- Ana María (1920)
- El amor nuevo (1920)
- El juego del amor y de la vida (1920)
- La mujer que huía del amor (1920)
- La vida que empieza (1920)
- Los caminos del mundo (1920)
- María Magda (1920)
- Maternidad (1920)
- Vampiresa (1920)
- Florecimiento (1925)
- La victoria (1925)
- Vida nueva (1925)
- ¿Cuál de las tres? (1925)
- Los hijos de la calle (1926)
- El otro amor (1926)
- La última primavera (1926)
- Resurrección (1926)
- El hijo de Clara (1927)
- La hija del verdugo (1927)
- El rescate de la cautiva (1927)
- El amor errante (1927)
- La ruta iluminada (1928)
- El último amor (1928)
- Frente al amor (1929)
- Sol en las cimas (1929)
- El sueño de una noche de verano (1929)
- La infinita sed (1930)
- Sonata patética (1930)
- Pasionaria (1930)
- Tú eres la vida (1930)
- El ocaso de los dioses (1930)
- Aurora roja (1931)
- Cara a la vida (1931)
- El amor que pasa (1931)
- Nocturno de amor (1931)
- Una mujer y dos hombres (1932)
- Amor en venta (1934)
- Nada más que una mujer (1935)
- Vidas sombrías (1935)
- Tres vidas de mujer (1937)
- La indomable (1938)
- Una vida (1940)
- Amor sin mañana
- La rebelión de los siervos
- La sombra del pasado
- Martirio
- Nuestra Señora del Paralelo
- Sinfonía apasionada
- Una historia triste

=== Other works ===
- La mujer, problema del hombre (1932)
- Heroínas (1935)
- Buenaventura Durruti (1936)
- In Memoriam of Comrade Durruti (1936)
- La voz de la F.A.I. (1936)
- El anarquismo militante y la realidad española (1937)
- La incorporación de las masas populares a la historia: la Commune, primera revolución consciente (1937)
- Anselmo Lorenzo (1938)
- Cien días de la vida de una mujer (1949)
- Jaque a Franco (1949)
- Mujeres en la cárcel (1949)
- El problema de los sexos: matrimonio, unión libre y amor sin convivencia (1950)
- Pasión y muerte de los españoles en Francia (1950)
- María Silva: la libertaria (1951)
- El Éxodo: pasión y muerte de españoles en el exilio (1969)
- Problemas del anarquismo español (1971)
- Crónicas de CNT: 1960-1961 (1974)
- Qué es el anarquismo (1974)
- El éxodo anarquista (1977)
- Cuatro mujeres (1978)
- Seis años de mi vida (1978)
- Mis primeros cuarenta años (1987)

== See also ==
- Anarchism in Spain
- Ana Sigüenza, another CNT member who in 2000 was first woman to be secretary general of a national trade union centre in Spain.

== Bibliography ==
- Ackelsberg, Martha (2005) [1991]. Free Women of Spain (2nd ed.). Oakland: AK Press. ISBN 1-902593-96-0. LCCN 2003113040. OCLC 63382446.
- Beevor, Antony (2006). The Battle for Spain: The Spanish Civil War 1936–1939. London: Weidenfeld & Nicolson. ISBN 0297848321. OCLC 64312268.
- Davies, Catherine (1998). "The Libertarian Superwoman: Federica Montseny (1905-1994)". Spanish Women's Writing 1849–1996. London: Athlone Press. pp. 137–151. ISBN 0-485-91006-3. LCCN 98-11468. OCLC 468307323.
- Fredericks, Shirley (1976). "Federica Montseny and Spanish Anarchist Feminism". Frontiers: A Journal of Women Studies. 1 (3): 71–80. doi:10.2307/3346171. ISSN 0160-9009. JSTOR 3346171. OCLC 5546259340.
- Fredericks, Shirley (1981). "Feminism: The Essential Ingredient in Federica Montseny's Anarchist Theory". In Slaughter, Jane; Kern, Robert (eds.). European Women on the Left: Socialism, Feminism, and the Problems Faced by Political Women, 1880 to the Present. Contributions in Women's Studies. Greenwood Press. pp. 125–145. ISBN 0313225435. OCLC 558469571.
- Lee, Andrew Hamilton (2012). Mothers without Fathers or Nothing More than a Woman: Gender and Anarchism in the Work of Federica Montseny, 1923–1929 (PDF) (PhD). New York University. ISBN 9781267260055. OCLC 809766346.
- Leggott, Sarah (2001). "An Anarchist Past: Federica Montseny". History and Autobiography in Contemporary Spanish Women's Testimonial Writings. Spanish Studies. Lewiston, New York: Edwin Mellen Press. ISBN 0-7734-7584-2. OCLC 433194794.
- Mangini, Shirley; González, Shirley Mangini (1995). Memories of Resistance: Women's Voices from the Spanish Civil War. Yale University Press. ISBN 978-0-300-05816-1.
- Thomas, Hugh (2001) [1961]. The Spanish Civil War. New York: Modern Library. ISBN 0-375-75515-2. OCLC 606682490.
