= Sara Dubovsky =

Argentine anarchist activist (1912–1997)

- Born: 1912; Santa Fe, Argentina
- Died: 15 March 1997 (aged 84–85); Buenos Aires, Argentina
- Movement: Anarchism
- Spouse: Francisco Peralta
- Children: Amor Peralta
- Parents: Adolfo Dubovsky (father); Rosa Dubovsky (mother)

Sara Dubovsky (1912–1997) was an Argentine anarchist activist. She was raised into the anarchist movement by her parents Rosa and Adolfo, who had emigrated to Argentina from Ukraine. She was an activist and writer from an early age. After being imprisoned in the wake of the 1930 Argentine coup d'état, she returned to activism, working at a library and agitating on behalf of prisoners.

== Biography ==
Sara Dubovsky was born in Santa Fe, Argentina, in 1912. She was the second child of Rosa Chanovsky and Adolf Dubovsky, two Ukrainian Jewish anarchists who had fled to Argentina in the wake of the 1905 Revolution. Rosa raised her children to be anarchists, debating anarchist philosophy with them and bringing them along to give food to detained anarchists.

Sara went along with her mother to anarchist meetings and helped her give out leaflets, bringing her into the Argentine anarchist movement at a young age. When she was only twelve years old, she began writing for the anarchist women's magazine Nuestra Tribuna. She wrote of her belief that young idealistic people of her generation could bring about moral progress in society and put an end to all forms of oppression. In 1929, she worked on the monthly review Palotes, in which she analysed the place of money in capitalism.

After the 1930 Argentine coup d'état, Dubovsky was arrested and imprisoned over her activism. She was locked in an asylum ran by nuns, while her family fled into hiding in Martínez. After she was released, she returned to activism in Buenos Aires, encouraged by her parents. She worked at the Émile Zola library, which was run by her mother, and a Jewish rationalist organisation. She also did graffiti in her neighbourhood. Like her mother, Sara became a prisoners' rights activist, regularly visiting political prisoners. She checked on them and brought them supplies, and organised demonstrations on their behalf. She joined the Argentine Libertarian Federation (FLA).

Dubovsky married fellow activist Francisco Peralta and gave birth to a daughter, Amor; both of them died before her. She remained active in the anarchist movement into old age. Dubovsky died on 15 March 1997, at the age of 85.

== Bibliography ==
- Deutsch, Sandra McGee (2010). Crossing Borders, Claiming a Nation: A History of Argentine Jewish Women, 1880–1955. Duke University Press. ISBN 9780822392606.
- Deutsch, Sandra McGee (23 June 2021). "Argentina: Jewish Women". The Shalvi/Hyman Encyclopedia of Jewish Women. OCLC 311509960.
- Dupuy, Rolf (7 January 2025) [31 May 2015]. "DUBOVSKY, Sara". Dictionnaire des militants anarchistes (in French).
- Tarcus, Horacio (2025). "DUBOVSKY, Sara". Diccionario biográfico de las izquierdas latinoamericanas (in Spanish). ISSN 2718-644X.
