= Rosa Dubovsky =

Argentinian activist, feminist and anarchist

- Роза Дубовська
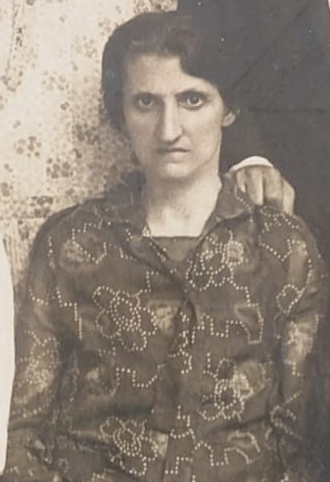
- Dubovsky, late 1920s
- Born: Rosa Chanovska; 9 January 1885; Odesa, Russian Empire
- Died: 1 June 1972 (aged 87); Buenos Aires, Argentina
- Resting place: La Tablada Israelite Cemetery
- Occupations: Hatmaker, upholsterer
- Organisation: Argentine Regional Workers' Federation
- Movement: Anarchism, feminism
- Spouse: Adolf Dubovsky (m. 1906; died 1936)
- Children: 6 (including Sara)

Rosa Dubovsky (née Chanovska; Ukrainian: Роза Дубовська; 9 January 1885 – 1 June 1972) was a Ukrainian-Argentine anarchist-feminist activist. Born in the Ukrainian city of Odesa, she and her husband fled the country after the Revolution of 1905. They moved to Argentina, where Dubovsky joined the Argentine anarchist movement and established anarchist women's groups, including the Emma Goldman Women's Library. A hatmaker and upholsterer by trade, she joined the Argentine Regional Workers' Federation (FORA) and organised working women at factories.

== Biography ==
Rosa Chanovska was born on 9 January 1885, in the Ukrainian city of Odesa, then part of the Russian Empire. She was raised in a Ukrainian Jewish family, and spoke Ukrainian as her mother tongue. She joined the Ukrainian anarchist movement and participated in the Revolution of 1905. She secretly married the anarchist activist Adolf Dubovsky, without her parents' permission. Following the suppression of the revolution and a rise in antisemitic pogroms, Rosa and Adolf fled the country together. They first moved to Turkey, before splitting up. Adolf went to Argentina and Rosa went to France. There she learned French, and through her contacts with the French anarchist movement, trained as a hatmaker; within a year she became the head of a workshop.

Rosa and Adolf Dubovsky reunited in Argentina in 1907 and settled in the city of Rosario, before moving to Santa Fe, where she again worked as a hatmaker. They quickly made ties with other Ukrainian Jewish emigrants, who taught Dubovsky Yiddish and Spanish, and the local Argentine anarchist movement. Dubovsky sought to integrate with the Argentine movement, rather than remaining within the Ashkenazi emigré community, and to break down the divisions between Jews and Catholics. She joined the city's anarchist movement and began going to their meetings and handing out their propaganda. She worked as the secretary of the Emilio Zolá Library, a local headquarters of the Argentine Regional Workers' Federation (FORA). She also held meetings and sheltered fugitive anarchists in her home, making it a target of police raids; she hid their anarchist literature under the kitchen table to keep them from being confiscated.

Dubovsky organised anarchist women's groups. Before long, she had become a local leader of the anarchist women's movement. A collector of anarchist literature, she often lent out her books to poor women. This led her to establish an anarchist women's library, which she named after Emma Goldman. She organized working women at a match factory, advising them on how to carry out a strike action. She also attempted to prevent sexual abuse within the anarchist movement and reprimanded male anarchists for misusing the principle of free love as permitting them to have sex indiscriminately.

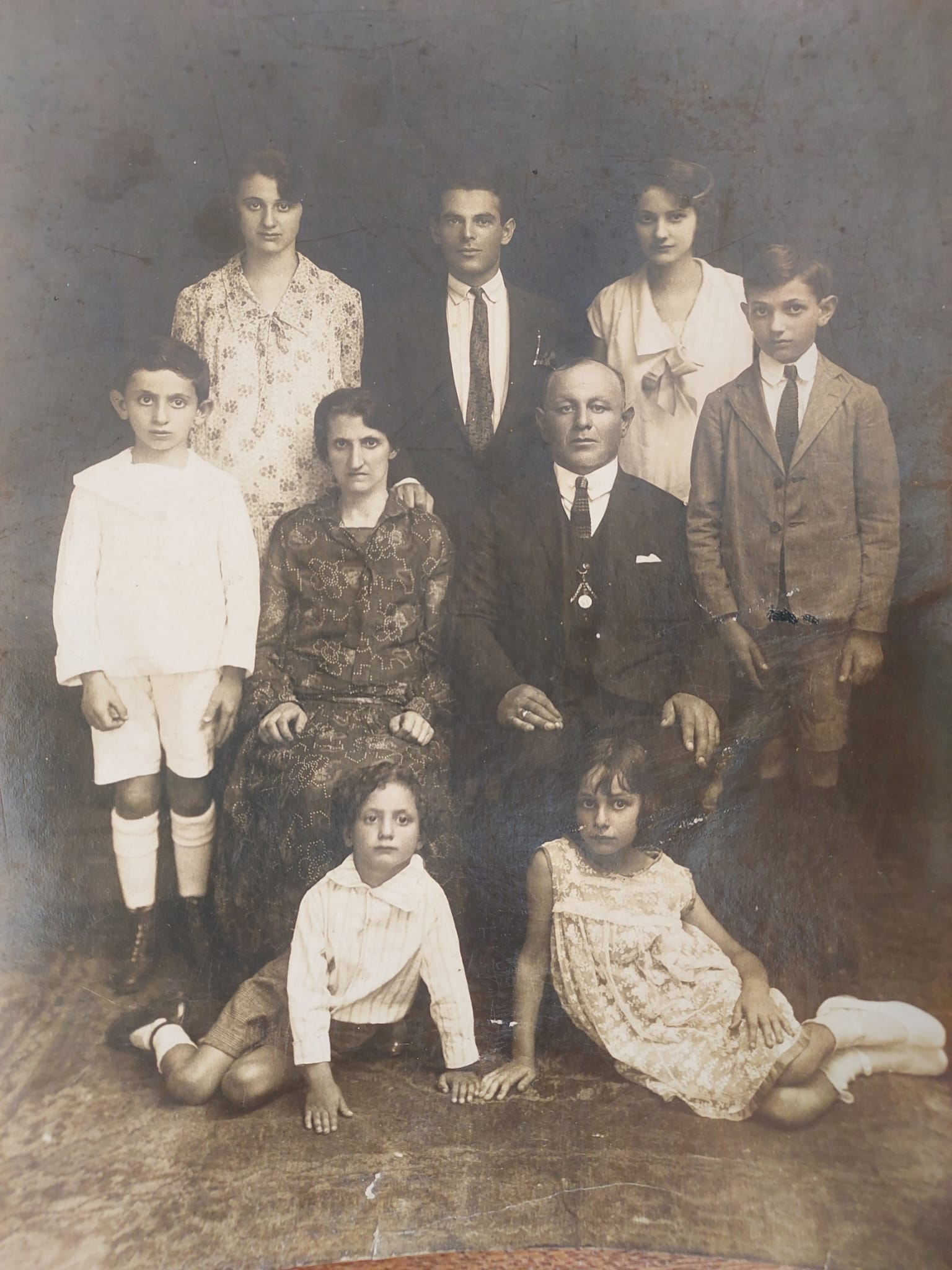
Rosa Dubovsky (seated) with her husband, children, and elder daughter Juana's husband

Adolf was routinely dismissed from his jobs due to his activism, forcing him to work from home with Rosa as an upholsterer; they made chairs, with Adolf doing the carpentry and Rosa handling the textiles. The couple had six children together. They spoke Spanish at home and Rosa made her children's clothes with scraps from fabric she had used in upholstery. Rosa raised her children to be anarchists, debating anarchist philosophy with them and bringing them along to give food to detained anarchists. Argentine anarcha-feminist Juana Rouco Buela cited the Dubovsky family as an example of the inter-generational transmission of anarchism. One of her daughters, Sara Dubovsky, joined the anarchist movement. Like her mother, Sara became a prisoners' rights activist, and in the 1920s, she wrote for the anarchist women's magazine Nuestra Tribuna.

Following the 1930 Argentine coup d'état, the family went into hiding in Buenos Aires. To support her family, Dubovsky manufactured soap at their home in Martínez and sold it at a market in San Isidro. Three of her children became militants, despite the threat of political repression during the Infamous Decade of the 1930s. Her daughter Sara was arrested and imprisoned during this period. Dubovsky continued agitating for anarchist-feminist ideas among women, often while talking to other residents of her building while they were drying their laundry. She also campaigned for the freedom of anarchist political prisoners and organised support for the Republicans during the Spanish Civil War.

After her husband died in 1936, Dubovsky went to work in a textile factory. She slowly pulled back from activism, but continued to attend anarchist events. She remained a member of the FORA, organising local seamstresses and teaching them about syndicalist tactics. She remained active in the Argentine anarchist movement into old age, later joining the Argentine Libertarian Federation (FLA). She died on 1 June 1972, and was buried in La Tablada Israelite Cemetery. Dubovsky was one of only a few Jewish anarchist women in Argentina whose names are known to history.

== See also ==
- Fenia Chertkoff – Argentine feminist, educator, translator and sculptor (1869–1927)
- Simón Radowitzky – Ukrainian-Argentine anarchist (1891–1956)

== Bibliography ==
- Belucci, Mabel (2007). "Mujeres Anarquistas" [Anarchist Women]. El Historiador (in Spanish). ISSN 1851-5843.
- Deutsch, Sandra McGee (2010). Crossing Borders, Claiming a Nation: A History of Argentine Jewish Women, 1880–1955. Duke University Press. ISBN 9780822392606.
- Deutsch, Sandra McGee (23 June 2021). "Argentina: Jewish Women". The Shalvi/Hyman Encyclopedia of Jewish Women. OCLC 311509960.
- Dupuy, Rolf (7 January 2025) [26 January 2020]. "DUBOVSKY, Rosa [née CHANOVSKY]". Dictionnaire des militants anarchistes (in French).
- Mendes, Philip (2014). Jews and the Left: The Rise and Fall of a Political Alliance. Springer. ISBN 978-1-137-00830-5.
- Tarcus, Horacio (2025). "DUBOVSKY, Rosa". Diccionario biográfico de las izquierdas latinoamericanas (in Spanish). ISSN 2718-644X.
