= Tierra y Libertad (newspaper) =

Tierra y Libertad ('Land and Freedom') is an anarchist periodical active in various incarnations. Initially published in Spain, it was later published in Mexico by Spanish exiles.

== As an anarchist magazine ==
In 1888, a periodical named Tierra y Libertad started being published in Gracia by Sebastián Suñé on a biweekly basis, but its circulation was very low. Without apparent continuity with the previous newspaper, a periodical with the same name started being published again in Madrid, from May 20, 1899, firstly as a supplement to La Revista Blanca and two years later independently. It was directed by Federico Urales, González Solá and Saavedra in its first decade and editors included Rafael Urbano, Pahissa, Rodríguez Romero, Urales, Eliseo Reclus, Charles Malato and others. It was published on a weekly basis, although in 1903 it temporarily became daily.

It moved to Barcelona in 1906, where it was published quite continuously until 1919, when it was suppressed. It reappeared in 1923 but was suppressed again by the dictatorship of Primo de Rivera.

== As an organ of FAI ==
Tierra y Libertad reappeared in 1930 in Valencia edited by the Federación Anarquista Ibérica (FAI). It was suspended and relaunched many times due to government persecution. In April 1931 it bore the subtitle Órgano de la revolución social de España (Organ of the social revolution in Spain). It contained various opinion articles, mostly on current affairs, as well as information on events and publications on libertarian issues. The magazine, like all anarchist publications, was self-managed by the FAI, refusing to receive subsidies from the State or institutions. In the 1930s it was one of the most widely read newspapers in Spain, with a circulation that reached 30,000 copies, the largest for a political press organ.

It stopped coming out after the end of the Spanish Civil War (during the war it was published as a newspaper). Ramón Rufat started publishing it clandestinely from 1944 in Madrid and Barcelona.

Since its relaunch in Spain in 1977 (after the Francoist dictatorship) it is published in a monthly basis.

== In Mexico ==
Between 1944 and 1988 it was also edited and published in Mexico by exiled Spanish anarchists.
