= Teresa Mañé =

Catalan teacher, editor, and writer (1865–1939)

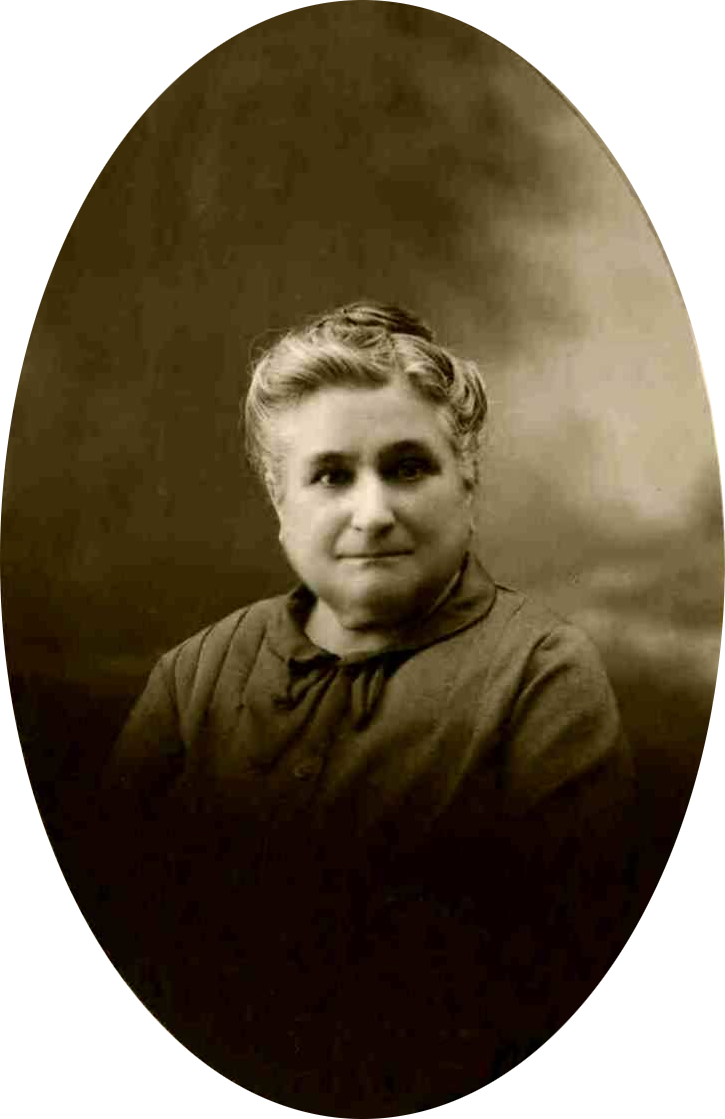
- Teresa Mañé (1929)
- Born: Teresa Mañé i Miravet; 29 November 1865; Cubelles, Spain
- Died: 5 February 1939 (aged 73); Perpinyà, France
- Other name: Soledad Gustavo
- Occupation: Teacher
- Notable work: La Revista Blanca
- Movement: Anarchism; progressive education
- Spouse: Joan Montseny i Carret (m. 1891)
- Children: Frederica Montseny i Mañé

Teresa Mañé i Miravet (1865–1939), also known by her pen name Soledad Gustavo, was a Catalan teacher, editor and writer. As a proponent of progressive education, Mañé founded some of the first secular schools in Catalonia. With her husband Joan Montseny, she edited the magazine La Revista Blanca, in which she elaborated her ideas on anarchism, feminism and pedagogy. Her daughter Frederica Montseny i Mañé went on to become a leading figure in the Spanish anarchist movement and the Minister of Health of the Second Spanish Republic.

== Biography ==
Teresa Mañé i Miravet was born in Cubelles, Spain, on 29 November 1865 into a relatively well-off family, who raised her in nearby Vilanova i la Geltrú. In 1883, she studied teaching in Barcelona and in 1886, she collaborated with Bartomeu Gabarró i Borràs in founding Catalonia's first secular school in Vilanova.

Politically, she initially considered herself federal republican but eventually became a committed anarchist, after meeting a number of Catalan anarchists, such as Josep Llunas i Pujals and Teresa Claramunt. She then went on to write for the radical press under the pseudonym of "Soledad Gustavo". In 1889, she participated in the Certamen Socialista literary competition in Barcelona, where she won a prize for writing El amor libre, an essay on free love. Soon after, she met Joan Montseny (alias Federico Urales), whom she married in 1891. The new couple moved to Reus, where they established another secular school, which taught children using the pedagogical approaches of Jean-Jacques Rousseau and Maria Montessori. Mañé was a member of the Confederation of Lay Teachers of Catalonia and promoted methods of progressive education, years before Francesc Ferrer i Guàrdia established his Modern School.

In the repression that followed the 1896 Barcelona Corpus Christi procession bombing, Montseny was imprisoned and later escaped into exile. By 1898, Montseny had clandestinely returned to Spain and settled with Mañé in Madrid, where they established the fortnightly magazine La Revista Blanca and the daily newspaper Tierra y Libertad. In these periodicals, Mañé wrote hundreds of articles on topics such as women's emancipation and progressive education, and also served as translator for contributions from Louise Michel and Antonio Labriola. She collaborated closely with her husband, with the couple often helping finish each other's essays. Her works saw publication as far away as Paterson, New Jersey, United States, where the Italian Women's Emancipation Group (Italian: Gruppo Emancipazione della Donna) was based. She collaborated with a number of foreign writers, such as the Galician anarchist Ricardo Mella, the Dutch socialist Ferdinand Domela Nieuwenhuis and the Italian feminist Anna Maria Mozzoni.

In 1905 she had a daughter, Frederica Montseny i Mañé, and soon moved to a house near Vallecas, where her extended family and friends lived on subsistence agriculture and through the earnings from their writings. But after a lawsuit against Joan by Arturo Soria y Mata threatened his arrest, the family moved back to Catalonia, where they took up livestock farming, while Mañé worked as a translator. Back in Barcelona, Mañé homeschooled her daughter using methods of progressive education, providing her with a wide range of material and allowing her the freedom to choose her own subjects to study. Mañé and her family also resumed publication of La Revista Blanca, which flourished despite attempts at repression by the dictatorship of Primo de Rivera.

Following the proclamation of the Second Spanish Republic, Mañé's daughter Frederica became a leading figure within the Spanish anarchist movement, taking prominent positions within the Confederación Nacional del Trabajo (CNT), the Federación Anarquista Ibérica (FAI) and the Mujeres Libres (ML). When the anarchists became a leading force in the Spanish Civil War, Frederica was invited to join the Republican government of Francisco Largo Caballero and became the country's Minister of Health, against the wishes of Mañé, who held firm to anti-statism. In late 1938, a nationalist offensive forced Mañé and her family to flee Catalonia into exile. Her health had rapidly deteriorated during the war, leaving her unable to cope with the stresses of their winter journey to Northern Catalonia. Mañé died on 5 February 1939 in Perpinyà, France.

== Views ==
Mañé propagated a form of anarcho-communism that stood in contrast to the dominant Spanish anarchist tendency of anarcho-syndicalism. In the debate between the anarchists and the syndicalists of the CNT, Mañé and her family took the side of the former, arguing that trade unions were a product of capitalism and that they therefore should not form the basis for a socialist economy. In July 1923, Mañé published El sindicalismo y la anarquia (English: Syndicalism and anarchy) in La Revista Blanca, in which she declared that "there are workers because there are bosses. Workerism will disappear with capitalism, and syndicalism with wages." Instead of syndicalism, Mañé argued for municipalism, focusing on a more communal form of organization based in the traditional municipio libre (English: free municipality). During the Spanish Revolution of 1936, Mañé's focus on community organizing saw successes in the advancement of women's rights, where workplace organizing fell short.

Mañé was also a prolific advocate of feminism. Along with Teresa Claramunt, she pioneered the tendency of anarchist feminism, which aspired for greater gender equality. Mañé was skeptical of free love, due to anarchist men's lack of feminism in practice. In October 1923, Mañé published Hablemos de la mujer (English: Let's talk about women) in La Revista Blanca, in which she stated that: "a man may like the idea of the emancipation of women, but he is not so fond of her actually practicing it... In the end, he may desire the other's woman, but he will lock up his own." In the same article, Mañé also insisted that the implementation of gender equality was the responsibility of women themselves, who would need to "demonstrate by their deeds that they think, are capable of conceiving ideas, of grasping principles, of striving for ends."

== Works ==
=== Essays ===
- El laicismo no es ateo (1888)
- El amor libre (1889)
- Dos Cartas (co-authored with Joan Montseny), (1891)
- Las Preocupaciones de los Despreocupados (co-authored with Joan Montseny) (1891)
- A las Proletarias (1896)
- El anarquismo y la mujer (1900)
- Concepto de la anarquía (1902)
- Las diosas de la vida (1910)
- Sindicalismo y Anarquía (1933)
- Política y Sociología (1933)

=== Translations ===
- The Conquest of Bread (Peter Kropotkin)
- The Future Society (Peter Kropotkin)

=== Periodicals ===
- La Revista Blanca (1898–1905; 1925–1936)
- Tierra y Libertad (1899–1904)
- El Luchador (1931)
- El Mundo al Día (1935–1936)

=== Collections ===
- La Novela Ideal (1925–1938)
- La Novela Libre (1933–1938)

=== Conferences ===
- La sociedad futura (Agrupación republicana Germinal, Madrid, 1899)
- La cuestión social (Ateneo de Madrid, 1902)

== See also ==
- Anarchism in Spain

== Bibliography ==
- Ackelsberg, Martha (2005) [1991]. "Anarchist Revolution and the Liberation of Women". Free Women of Spain (2nd ed.). Oakland: AK Press. pp. 37–60. ISBN 1-902593-96-0. LCCN 2003113040. OCLC 63382446.
- Brey, Gérard (2012). "Tierra y Libertad. Cien años de anarquismo en España". Cahiers de civilisation espagnole contemporaine (in Spanish). 1. doi:10.4000/ccec.4126. ISSN 1957-7761. OCLC 8081367052.
- Davies, Catherine (1998). "The Libertarian Superwoman: Federica Montseny (1905-1994)". Spanish Women's Writing 1849–1996. London: Athlone Press. pp. 137–151. ISBN 0-485-91006-3. LCCN 98-11468. OCLC 468307323.
- Greene, Patricia V. (1998). "Prensa y praxis feminista en La Revista Blanca (1898-1905)". Actas del XIII Congreso de la Asociación Internacional de Hispanistas (PDF) (in Spanish). Vol. IV. Madrid: Castilia. pp. 105–110. ISBN 9788470398483. OCLC 1202073571 – via Centro Virtual Cervantes.
- Lee, Andrew H. (2009). "Gustavo, Soledad (1865–1939)". In Ness, Immanuel (ed.). The International Encyclopedia of Revolution and Protest. Wiley-Blackwell. p. 1. doi:10.1002/9781405198073.wbierp0667. ISBN 9781405198073. OCLC 8682165860.
- Micó i Millan, Joan (2002). Teresa Mañé i Miravet (1865-1939) (PDF). Retrat (in Catalan). Vol. 16. Vilanova i la Geltrú: Ajuntament de Vilanova i la Geltrú. OCLC 433040492.
- Montagut Contreras, Eduardo (5 March 2015). "Soledad Gustavo: la intensa lucha de una maestra y editora". Los Ojos de Hipatia (in Spanish). Torrent. ISSN 2341-0612. OCLC 1201148620. Archived from the original on 15 March 2015.
- Puente Pérez, Ginés (2016). De Soledad Gustavo a Teresa Mañé (1865-1939) (Master's) (in Spanish). Barcelona: University of Barcelona.
- Sánchez Parra, Jenny Cristina (2018). ""Amo la ciencia y la verdad, pero si todo el tiempo me lo ocupa el trabajo…"". Diacronie (in Spanish). 34 (2). doi:10.4000/diacronie.8475. ISSN 2038-0925. OCLC 8049576649. S2CID 240452227.
- Soriano Jiménez, Ignacio C. (2016). Semblanza de Teresa Mañé i Miravet, Soledad Gustavo (1865–1939) (in Spanish). Alicante: Biblioteca Virtual Miguel de Cervantes - Portal Editores y Editoriales Iberoamericanos (siglos XIX–XXI) - EDI-RED. pp. 1–3. OCLC 857718597.
