= Congress of Carrara =

1968 international meeting of anarchist groups

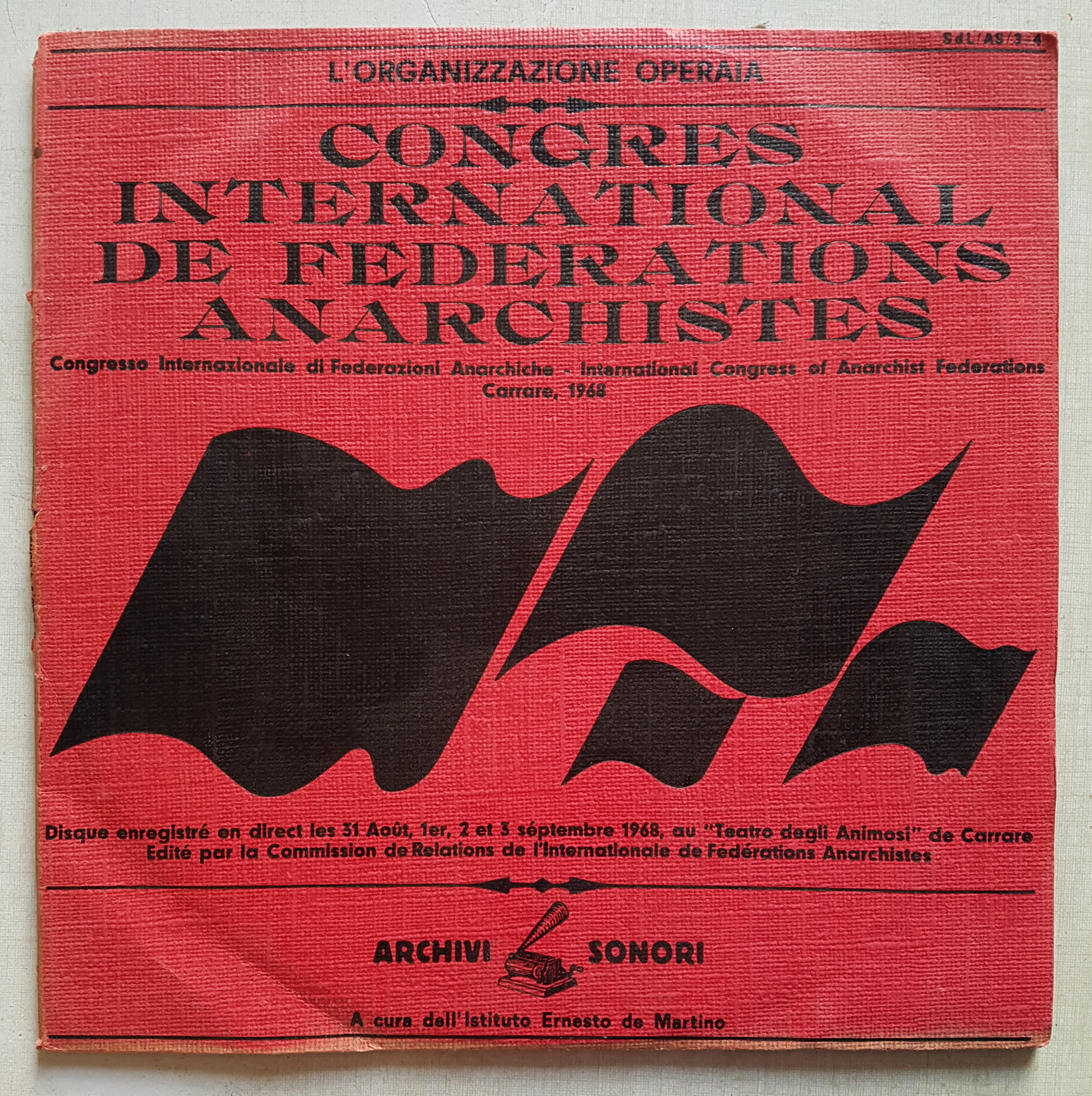
- Album giving some of the speeches of the Congress of Carrara
- Date: 31 August - 5/9 September 1968
- Locations: Carrara, Italy
- Participants: 40 delegates from 31 federations, 121 participants at least, considering media correspondents and anarchist observers
- People: Federica Montseny; Daniel Cohn-Bendit; Guy Malouvier; Domingo Rojas; Stuart Christie (left on the first day to do the Street Congress)

The Congress of Carrara, held from 31 August to 5 September 1968, in the eponymous city, is one of the major anarchist congresses of the 20th century. Led by anarchist federations from 31 countries—primarily European—the congress aimed to coordinate anarchists on an international scale and founded the International of Anarchist Federations (IAF), one of the main anarchist organizations to this day.

40 delegates and around 120 participants attended the congress, which took place shortly after the Prague Spring and May '68, events marking the rebirth of the anarchist movement. Numerous topics were debated and discussed, such as the economic systems favored by anarchists, how to carry out the revolution, relations between anarchists and Marxists, and the reception of the Cuban Revolution. The delegates decided that their new organization would act in concert with the Anarcho-Syndicalist International (IWA-AIT/ICT) and that their actions would be coordinated and complementary.

Although the congress succeeded in founding the IAF as intended, it was also criticized by many anarchists for its legalistic, bureaucratic, and even reformist aspects—particularly because it only gave voice to delegates pre-selected by national anarchist federations and excluded more radical voices. The fact that the congress was overwhelmingly composed of European anarchists, despite the existence of significant non-European anarchist federations, was also a point of criticism. Some congress participants, such as Daniel Cohn-Bendit, actively worked to marginalize the positions of non-European anarchists—for example, by downplaying the repression of Cuban anarchists in response to Domingo Rojas, the delegate from the Mexican Anarchist Federation—though his positions were not adopted by the congress.

== History ==
=== Context ===
==== General situation of the anarchist movement on the eve of the Congress of Carrara ====
In the 19th century, the development of capitalism saw the formation of several opposing political ideologies and movements, particularly anarchism. Anarchists advocate for the struggle against all forms of domination perceived as unjust, among which is economic domination, with the development of capitalism. They are particularly opposed to the State, viewed as the institution enabling the endorsement of many of these dominations through its police, army, and propaganda. They want to replace the State and capitalism by equalitarian, voluntary, stateless societies.

During the 1880s, the Anti-authoritarian International, a foundational organisation in anarchist history—which brought together a major part of the anarchists and provided important theoretical foundations for the movement—disappeared. It was replaced by other systems of organisation among anarchists, notably companionship and, later, anarcho-syndicalism.

From the 1920s until approximately the 1940s, intense debates traversed anarchist circles regarding their modes of organisation. Two positions emerged and opposed each other: on the one hand, Platformism, promoted by Nestor Makhno, argued that anarchists should gather in an organisation with a clear and restricted political line; on the other hand, Synthesis, promoted by Errico Malatesta, Volin or Sébastien Faure, considered that to unite all anarchist tendencies in one organisation, it must be open to and inclusively gather all these currents.

Within the framework of these theoretical oppositions, and in response to the reformism of the CNT in the late 1920s, the first anarchist federation of the Synthesis line was born: the Iberian Anarchist Federation (FAI), founded in 1927. The Francophone Anarchist Federation (FAF) was founded in 1937, and other similar organisations spread throughout the world, in Japan or Korea, for example.

==== Premises and preparations ====
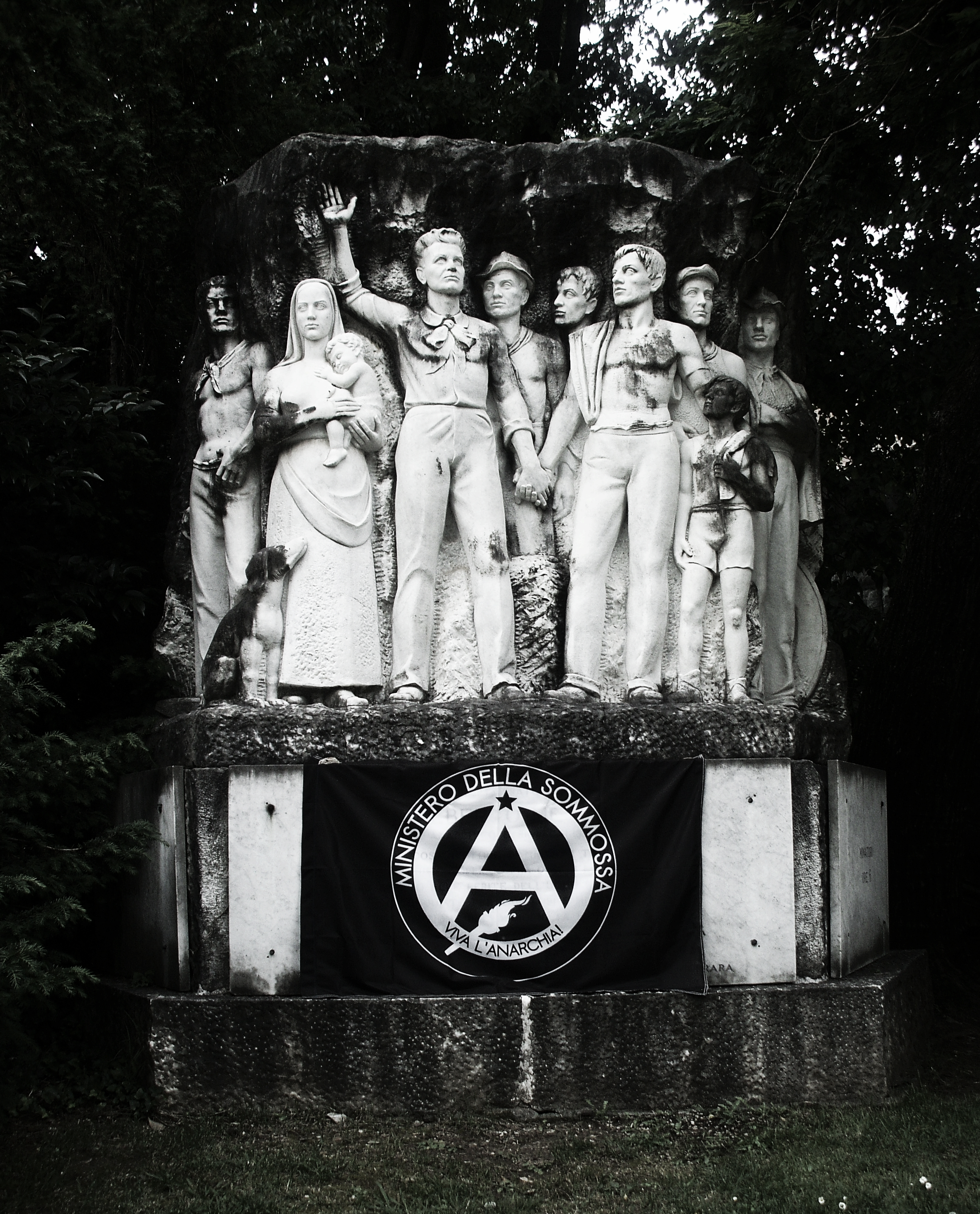
The Alberto Meschi monument in Carrara, with a circle-A in honour of that anarchist and anti-fascist

While the anarchist movement underwent a demographic decline throughout the 20th century, due in part to the rise of Fascism in Italy, Nazism in Germany, and Marxist-Leninists in the USSR, the situation evolved in the early 1960s. This period saw the combination of numerous social struggles, such as the opposition to the wars in Algeria and then Vietnam, the Civil Rights movement for African Americans and other discriminated minorities in the US, the beginning of various counter-cultures, and more generally, the social critique of post-World War II states.

Carrara, in Italy, is a city deeply linked to anarchist history. Since Malatesta established groups there decades earlier, the anarchist movement developed significantly; so much so that in 1968, it was estimated that up to 90% of the population of the city and its surrounding region were anarchists. It naturally served as a privileged congress location for the Italian Anarchist Federation (FAIt), which met there several times.

In 1965, during one of its national congresses organised in Carrara, the FAIt decided to seek an international congress of anarchist federations. It therefore sent a delegate to Paris, Umberto Marzocchi, so that he could assess the possibility of the Francophone Anarchist Federation (FAF)—another important federation—joining the FAIt in such an initiative. The proposals he carried received a very positive reception in Paris: in 1966, the FAF decided to set up an international committee to prepare the congress. They specifically decided that the speakers at the congress would be the delegates from each federation, a measure they believed would help avoid the fate of the 1958 London Congress, which was considered a failure as few concrete decisions were made there.

Six anarchists were then appointed to be part of this organizing commission: for the Italian Federation, it was Marzocchi; for the Francophone Federation, Guy Malouvier. The commission also included the Belgian Natalis, the Spaniard Palau y Ocaña, the Bulgarian Balkanski, and the Japanese Eguchi Kan. They wished to organise the congress as quickly as possible, but this initiative was made more difficult by the arrival of new social movements—in 1968, especially, anarchists in France were one of the main forces behind May 68, a series of revolutionary events directed against the French State and General de Gaulle.

=== Participants ===
Following May 68 and in the revolutionary fervor that was then affecting anarchists in Europe, the congress was organized shortly thereafter, at the end of August 1968. It brought together 31 anarchist federations from around the world, the detailed list of which, as provided by the historian Poor Peter, is as follows:

Bulgarian Anarchists in Exile, Iberian Anarchist Federation (FAI), Dutch Anarchist Movement, Italian Anarchist Federation (FAIt), Francophone Anarchist Federation (FAF), Japanese Anarchist Federation (FAJ), Brazilian Libertarian Movement, Cuban Libertarian Movement in Exile, Mexican Anarchist Federation, German Anarchist Movement, Argentine Libertarian Federation (FLA), Australian Anarchist Federation, Anarchist Federation of Great Britain and Ireland (AF), Quebec Anarchist Federation, Libertarian Organizations of Peru, New Zealand Anarchist Federation, United States Anarchist Movement, Finnish Libertarian Movement, Federation of Libertarian Groups of Chile, Anarchist Federation of China (domestic and in exile), Colombian Anarchist Movement, Greek Anarchist Movement, Swiss Libertarian Socialist Federation, Vietnamese Anarchist Movement, Portuguese Anarchist Movement, Anarchist Federation of Jutland, Jewish Anarchist Federation of New York, Canadian Anarchist Movement, Romanian Anarchist Movement, Costa Rican Anarchist Movement, Panamanian Anarchist Movement, and finally the Guatemalan Anarchist Movement.

Most participating organizations sent between 1 and 3 delegates each, but the Francophone and Italian federations were overrepresented as organizers of the congress.

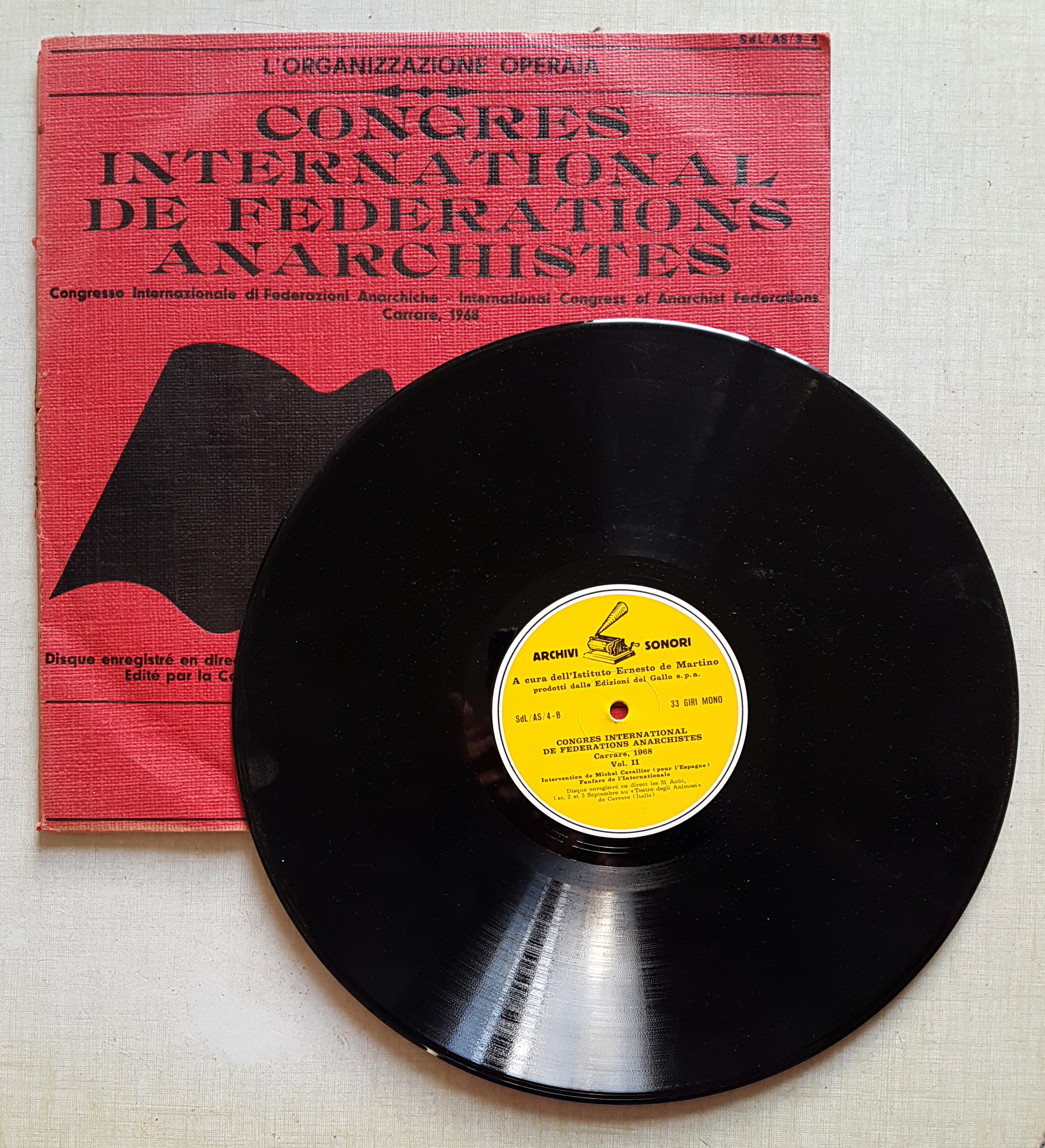
Album giving some of the speeches of the Congress of Carrara

In addition to the actual participants, numerous observers attended the congress, such as the International Center for Research on Anarchism (ICRA) and the Anarcho-Syndicalist International (IWA-AIT/ICT). According to official figures, at least 121 people attended the congress, including 40 delegates, 67 observers, and 14 media representatives from British, French, and Turkish outlets, among others.

Daniel Cohn-Bendit, who was an anarchist at the time and carried the prestige of May 68, also managed to integrate himself into the congress: he was a local celebrity, with the communist police chief of Carrara even coming to ask him for an autograph.

=== Proceedings, debates, and stances ===
==== Founding of the International of Anarchist Federations (IAF) ====
The congress founded the International of Anarchist Federations (IAF), an organization gathering the participating federations and intended to coordinate the action and perspectives of the various anarchist federations. Federica Montseny, a delegate from the FAI, was a strong proponent of this foundation and made speeches in its favour at the congress. From the outset, this organization was seen as needing to coordinate its actions with the Anarcho-Syndicalist International (IWA-AIT/ICT), and to carry out actions in support of the anarcho-syndicalist movement.

==== Economic stances ====
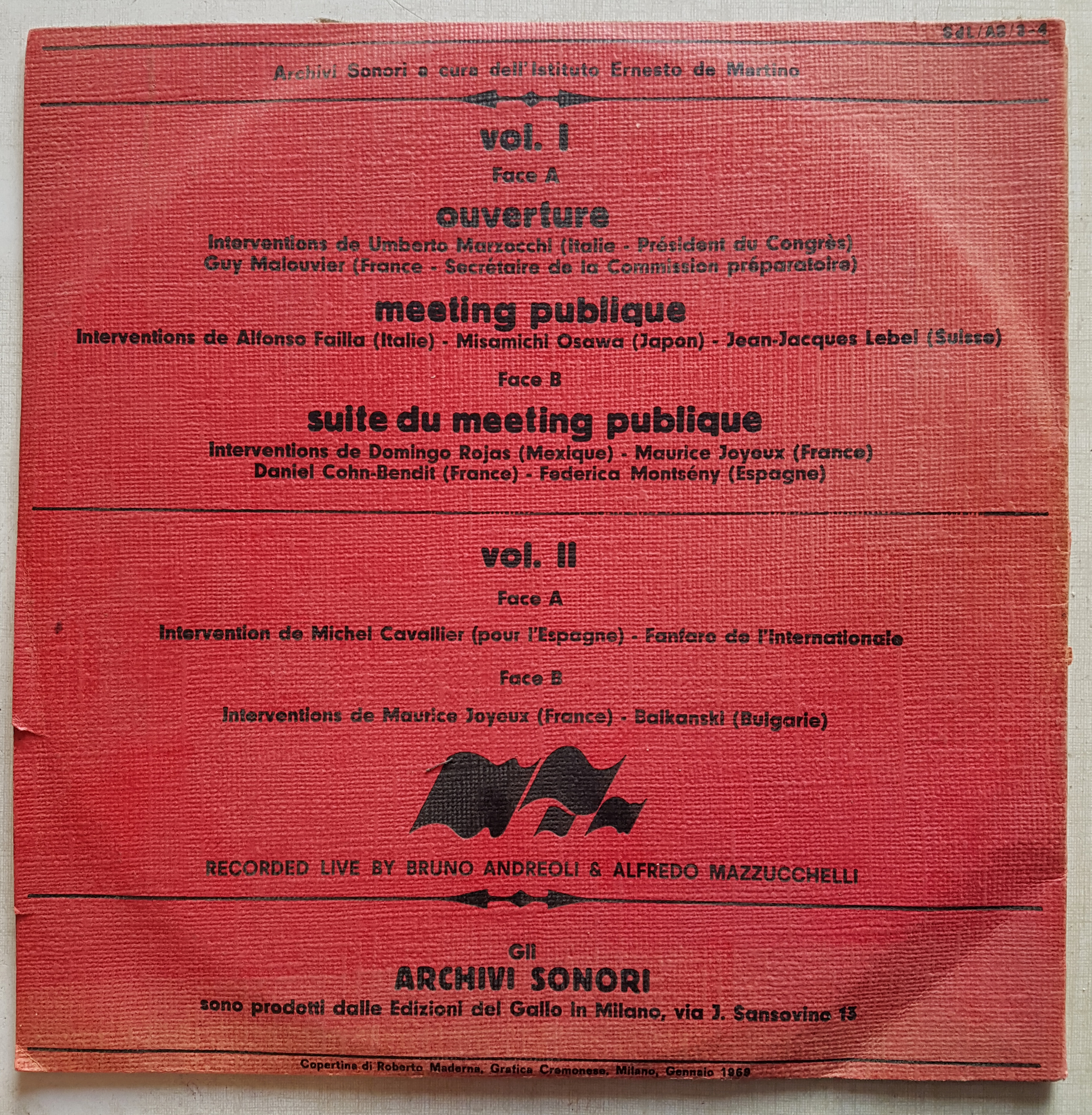
Album giving some of the speeches of the Congress of Carrara

The congress opened with a declaration by each delegate. In his own, Miguel Cavallier, representing the FAI, argued that anarchists must fight against both capitalism and the Marxist–Leninist economic structures, which he believed would perpetuate exploitation. He proposed that the foundation of any anarchist economic system should be 'the freedom and well-being of every human being, in an atmosphere of social equality and human solidarity'. His declaration was inspired by the economic system led by the CNT-FAI during the Spanish Social Revolution, but he considered any economic system outside of capitalism, oppression, private property, and oriented toward equality, to be of interest. Cavallier argued that, since it is likely that the anarchist revolution will not arrive simultaneously in every place, anarchists should be prepared to use transitional or improvable economic forms.

His declaration received the unanimous approval of the delegates.

==== Organization vs. Revolutionary spontaneity ====
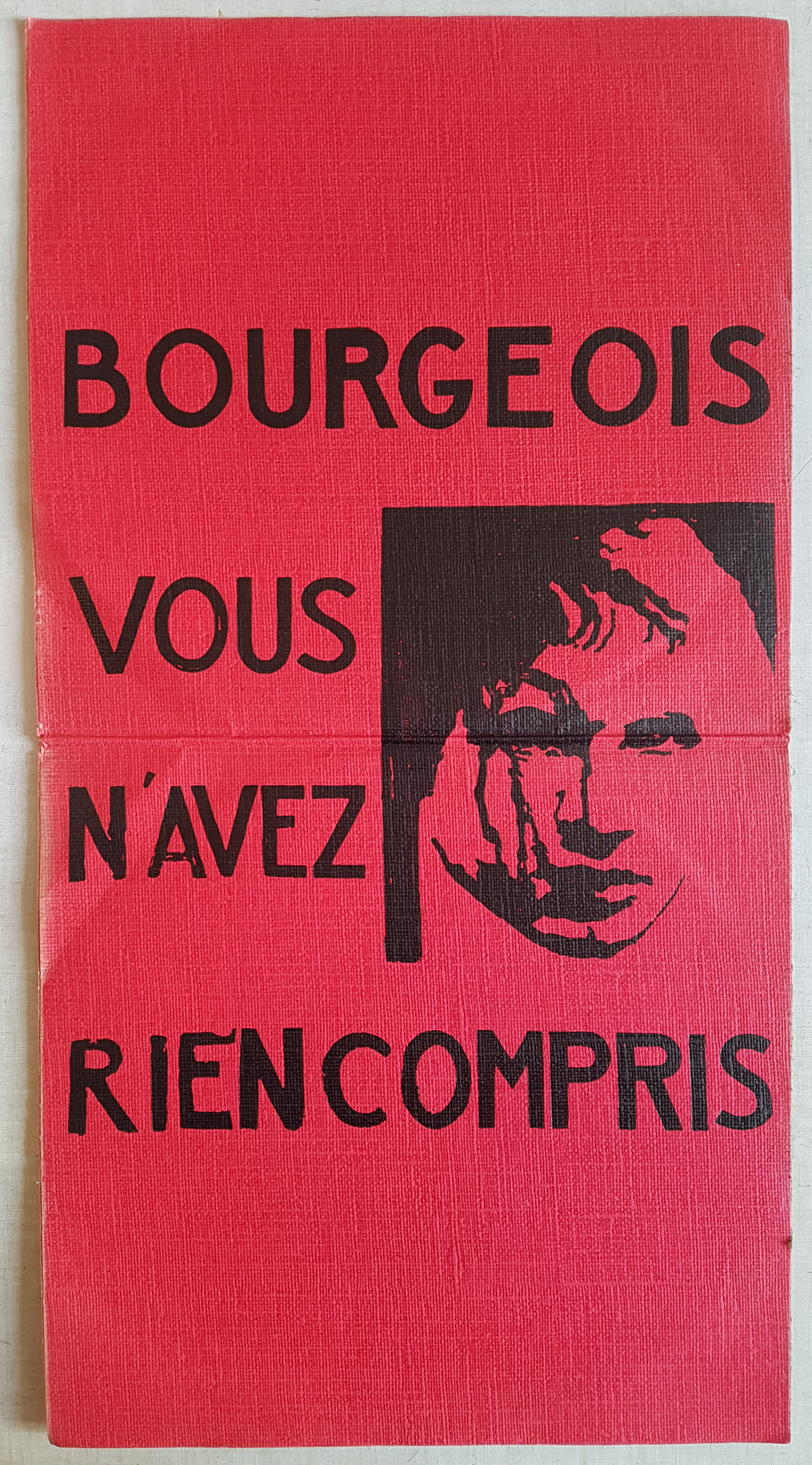
Carrara Congress album - here with a writing saying 'Bourgeois, you didn't understand anything!'

Debates were heard at the congress regarding the choice between creating legal organizations, such as anarchist federations, or whether to favour revolutionary spontaneity. Cohn-Bendit and Montseny opposed each other on this issue, the former arguing that the revolution should be pursued as quickly as possible, relying on revolutionary spontaneity, while Montseny preferred the creation of organizations that would allow for propaganda and reaching a larger number of people. She declared that, when younger, she would have also defended Cohn-Bendit's positions during the Spanish Revolution, but that her experience showed her the other choice was better.

In reality, Montseny was heavily criticized at the time by a significant portion of the Spanish anarchist movement for her positions, which were described as static or even reformist. For her, supporting her position at the congress was likely a way to affirm it later in Spain.

==== Debates on the Cuban Revolution and Marxists ====
The congress was also divided on the subject of the Cuban Revolution and relations with Marxists. Domingo Rojas, delegate of the Mexican Anarchist Federation (FAMex), was in contact with many Cuban anarchists who were imprisoned, exiled, or killed by Fidel Castro's dictatorship. He therefore considered himself a representative of Cuban anarchists and adopted a very negative stance towards the Cuban Revolution, marked by the significant repression the regime imposed on the anarchists he knew.

This position, which was shared by most members of the congress and was ultimately adopted, was ardently opposed by Cohn-Bendit, who argued that the Cuban Revolution was nonetheless positive given the blow it dealt to the United States. According to the historian Poor Peter, he dishonestly defended the notion that anarchists were just as persecuted in Western Europe as they were in Cuba during that period. Generally, within the congress, he contributed to invisibilizing the claims of Cuban anarchists, who were already underrepresented compared to the European Anarchist Federations.

== Legacy ==
=== Influence ===
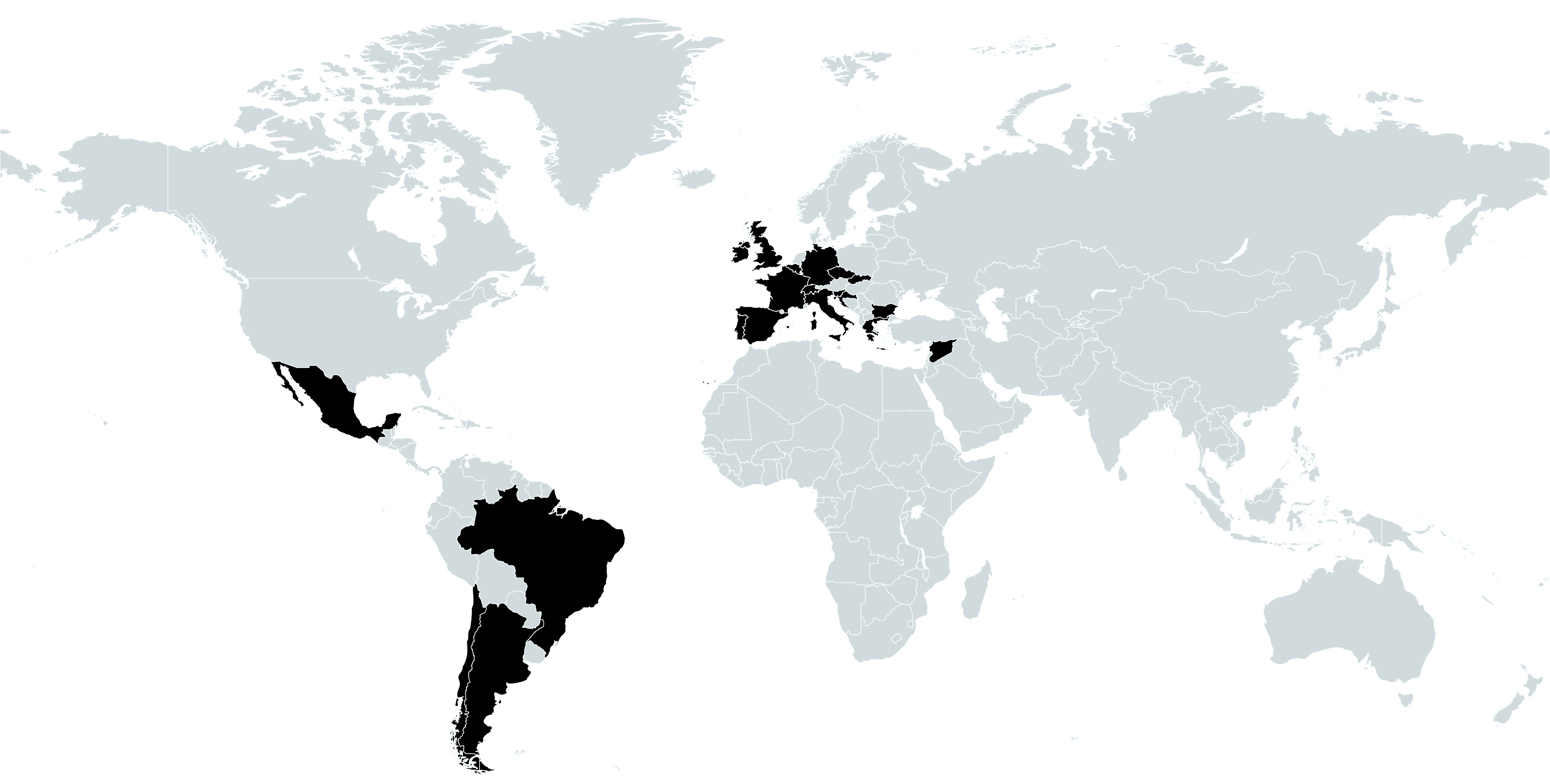
Map showing the regions where IAF members operated in December 2026

The 1968 Carrara Congress founded the International of Anarchist Federations (IAF), one of the main anarchist organizations in contemporary anarchism. According to Poor Peter, it is one of the most important anarchist congresses of the 20th century.

=== Criticisms and limitations ===
The congress was also heavily criticized by many anarchists. This meeting, intended to be international, primarily gathered European anarchists; non-European anarchist federations were underrepresented and their opinions were invisibilized. This criticism was raised even by some non-European delegates, such as Osawa Masamichi, delegate of the Japanese Anarchist Federation, who stated:

'Comrades, I must confess my disappointment: apart from three Japanese comrades, there are only white people here. As you know, Europe is not the only center of the world revolution: Asia, Africa, and Latin America are producing new forces that profoundly influence the revolutionary process.'

The fact that the congress took a legalistic path was also heavily criticized by many anarchists. Stuart Christie, the English delegate, left the congress on the very first day and organized the Street Congress. This counter-congress, also held in Carrara, invited any anarchist to speak and intervene, not just delegates from national federations. It too became an important event for the anarchist movement, leading to the internationalization of the Anarchist Black Cross, which Christie perceived as an organization presenting more interesting and serious revolutionary and anarchist perspectives.

Octavi Alberola and Ariane Gransac, two anarchists from the First of May Group, responsible for several attacks against the Franco dictatorship, also criticized the congress's bureaucratic, legalistic, and even reformist aspects. They argued that the renaissance of anarchism from the 1960s onward was due to the actions of anarchist groups engaging in direct action and propaganda of the deed, and not these 'static, reformist, and bureaucratic' endeavours. The fact that non-delegates, often younger and more radical, were unable to truly speak and be heard at the congress, profoundly shocked them.

In general, although it was an important anarchist movement congress, it failed on many points to establish its International effectively, as the IAF was criticized from the start and far from unanimous support. Poor Peter states that:

In short, the International Anarchist Congress in Carrara, organized in August–September 1968 after several years of preparation, only partially and ambivalently met the expectations placed upon it. Although its realization was the result of broad and concerted international coordination, the actual participation proved to be more limited and unilateral than anticipated, both nationally and organizationally. [...] While the Congress unanimously adopted the economic program presented by the Spanish FAI delegation, the latter was not truly innovative: it partially repeated the ideas of the 19th-century classics and relied on the experiences of the Spanish Revolution, sometimes in an insufficiently critical manner. In the objective context of the time and considering the actual state of the movement, this program could not be implemented, even partially, in the near future. [...] The efforts deployed to create a new Anarchist International were undeniably impressive, and the birth of the IAF sparked many hopes by facilitating coordination and cooperation between organizations, especially in Western Europe. [...] [But the rejection of the radical factions] considerably reduced the International's real potential for action, while condemning the radicals to act alone, with limited material resources and weak organizational support. The events only strengthened their conviction that the official structures of the movement, which claimed legitimacy, should be ignored, and that the path forward was one of informal coordination between radical groups, anarchist or otherwise, around concrete objectives, without waiting for permanent or formal structures.

== Bibliography ==
- Avrich, Paul (1971) [1967]. The Russian Anarchists. Princeton: Princeton University Press. ISBN 0-691-00766-7. OCLC 1154930946.
- Baker, Zoe (2023), Means and Ends: The Revolutionary Practice of Anarchism in Europe and the United States, Edinburgh: AK Press, ISBN 978-1-84935-498-1
- Berthier, René (2015), La fin de la première Internationale [The end of the First Internationale] (in French), Paris: Le Monde Libertaire, ISBN 978-2915514636
- Jourdain, Edouard (2013). L'anarchisme [Anarchism]. Paris: La Découverte. ISBN 978-2-7071-9091-8.
- Peter, Poor (2025), "The 1968 Carrara International Anarchist Congress and the birth of the International of Anarchist Federations (IAF)", Aetas, Hungary, p. 27, doi:10.14232/aetas.2025.2.112-138 (inactive 3 December 2025)
- van der Walt, Lucien; Schmidt, Michael (2009). "Militant Minority: The Question of Anarchist Political Organisation". Black Flame: The Revolutionary Class Politics of Anarchism and Syndicalism. Edinburgh: AK Press. pp. 239–267. ISBN 978-1-904859-16-1. LCCN 2006933558. OCLC 1100238201.
- Schmidt, Michael (2013) [2012]. Cartography of Revolutionary Anarchism. Edinburgh: AK Press. ISBN 978-1849351386. OCLC 881111188.
- Ward, Colin (2004). Anarchism: A Very Short Introduction. Oxford University Press (OUP).
