= Anarchy 2023 =

Anarchist gathering in 2023

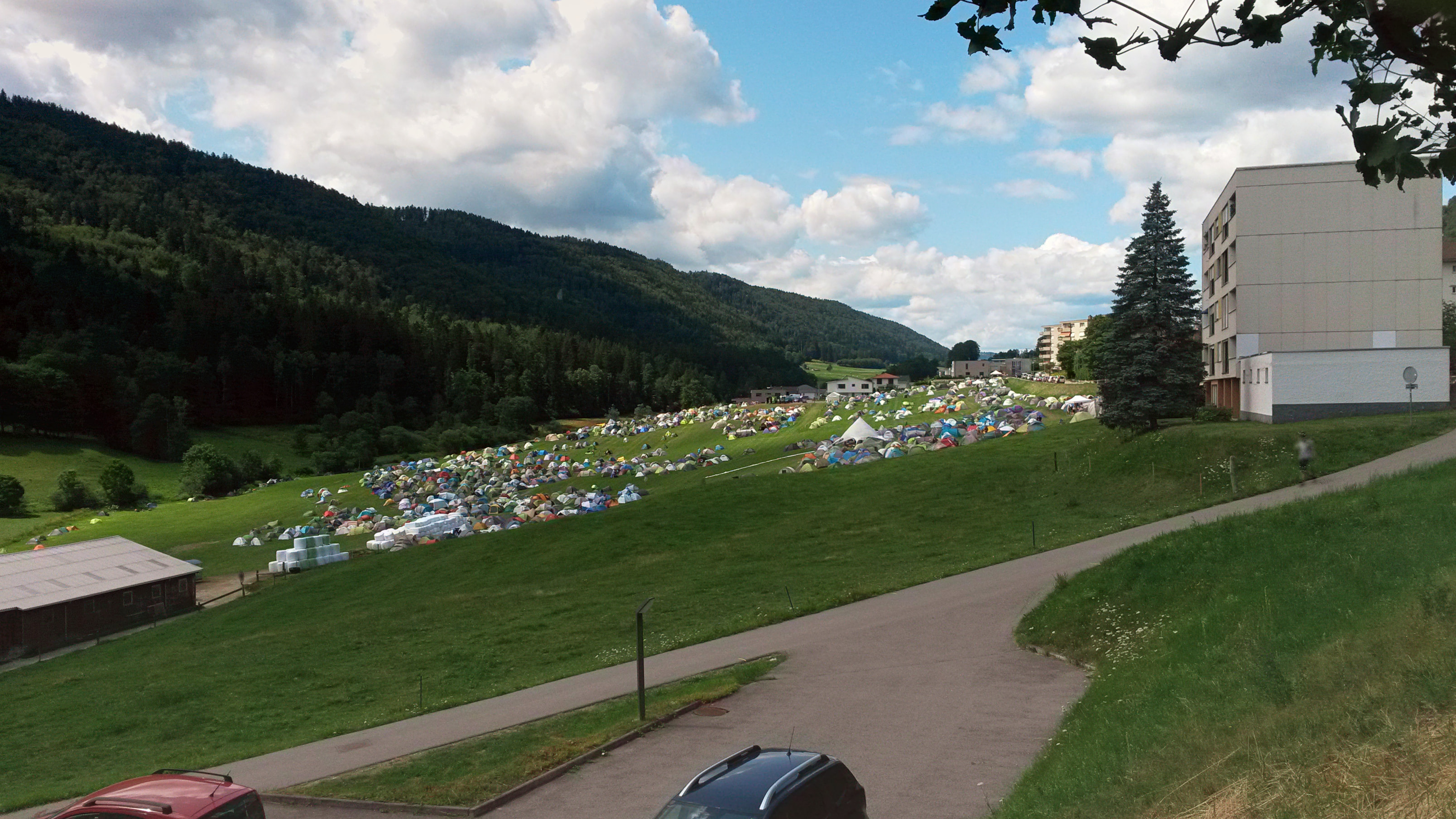
- Main camping location in Saint Imier
- Date: July 19–23, 2023
- Duration: 4 days
- Type: Political and cultural gathering
- Motive: Coordinate anarchists, allow them to meet and interact
- Organized by: International of Anarchist Federations (IAF); Other groups and individuals
- Participants: 5000+

Anarchy 2023, or the International Anti-Authoritarian Gatherings of 2023, was an anarchist gathering organized from 19 to 23 July 2023 in Saint-Imier, Switzerland, by the International of Anarchist Federations (IAF) and other organizations. Intended to celebrate the 150th anniversary of the founding of the Anti-authoritarian International in Saint-Imier in 1872, it was possibly the largest anarchist gathering of the 21st century, bringing together between 4,000 and 6,000 anarchists from multiple continents.

The gathering was self-managed on many aspects, such as the kitchen, which served tens of thousands of meals throughout the event. Hundreds of stands, activities, and concerts were organized, and anarchists discussed several important points of contemporary anarchism, such as Rojava, anarcha-feminism, climate justice, and the fate of anarchist detainees in solitary confinement in Italy. Russia's invasion of Ukraine stood out as a frequently discussed topic.

Conflicts also arose during the gathering, for example, regarding the Francophone Anarchist Federation (FAF) stand's decision to continue selling L'Impasse islamique, a book written by Hamid Zanaz with a foreword by Michel Onfray, someone associated with the far right. These conflicts led to physical confrontations between FAF members and young anarchist women displeased about the issue.

Generally, the residents of Saint-Imier were satisfied with the event and quite proud of their commune's anarchist heritage.

== History ==
=== Anarchism and the Saint-Imier Congress as one of the foundations of this movement ===
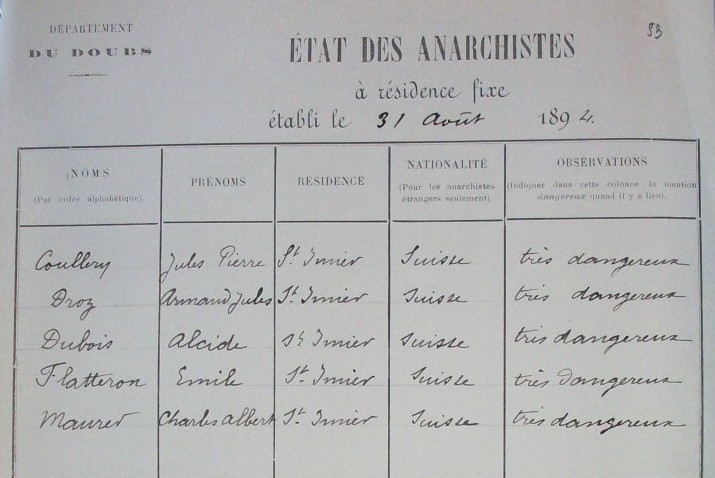
French police noting the names of several anarchists residing in St. Imier with the mention 'very dangerous' (1894) (collection of Archives Anarchistes)

One of the most important organizations in the history of the anarchist movement is the First International, reformed into the Anti-authoritarian International in 1872 after the Hague and Saint-Imier congresses. This organization and this second congress provided an ideological and practical backbone for the anarchist movement, so much so that it is considered to be its effective birth, or one of its effective births. The Saint-Imier Congress adopted fundamental points of anarchist ideology when it decided:

1. That the destruction of all political power is the first duty of the proletariat;
2. That any organisation of a supposedly provisional and revolutionary political power to bring about this destruction can only be another deception and would be as dangerous to the proletariat as all the governments existing today;
3. That, rejecting all compromise to achieve the realisation of the Social Revolution, proletarians of every land must establish solidarity of revolutionary action outside of all bourgeois politics.

=== International Anti-Authoritarian Gatherings ===
==== Organization ====
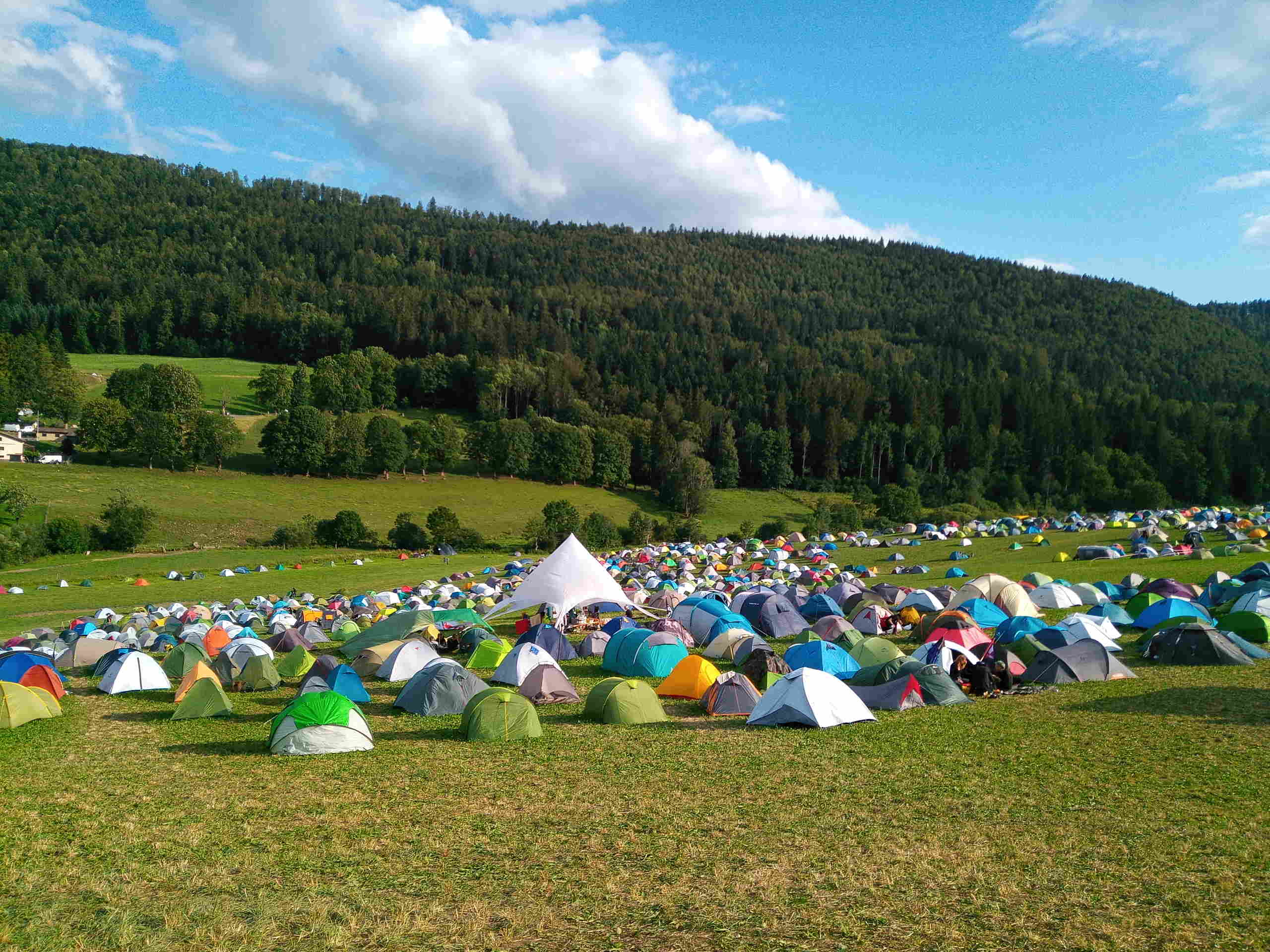
Main camping location in Saint Imier

In the first half of the 21st century, the anarchist movement finds itself in a different situation than the one presented to the delegates in Saint-Imier, but it is nonetheless one of the crucial events in anarchist history: the Francophone Anarchist Federation (FAF) and other anarchist organizations therefore decided to hold an international anarchist gathering in the town to celebrate the 150th anniversary of the Saint-Imier Congress.

The organization of the event took place during the COVID-19 pandemic, a particular period roughly spanning from 2020 to 2022, which prevented or complicated the holding of such events – the gatherings were thus organized in 2023 and not in 2022 as initially planned. The program consisted of 300 workshops, 48 concerts, and 42 screenings over four days, from 19 to 23 July 2023, some were made in connection with Espace Noir ('Black Space'), a self-managed anarchist cultural space in the commune.

==== Proceedings and main topics discussed ====
The gatherings brought together between 4,000 and 6,000 anarchists, possibly making them the largest anarchist gathering of the 21st century. The cooking and dishwashing were self-managed by the visiting anarchists and served tens of thousands of meals over the five days. The workshops and presentations covered very diverse topics, such as:

the situation in the autonomous territories of Rojava and Chiapas, communalism, anti-racism, the actions of the transnational No Border network, refugee protection, climate justice, ecosocialism, permaculture, hacking, anarcha-feminism, or the fate of anarchist detainees in solitary confinement in Italian prisons.

Many graffiti were made in Saint-Imier during these gatherings; anarchists were seen walking barefoot in the town or frolicking around – others (or the same ones) engaged in civil resistance actions, such as leading demonstrations in certain nearby towns – a number of them also travelled to Bern, to see the grave of Bakunin, one of the founders of anarchism.

One of the central topics addressed in the discussions and debates at the gathering was the issue of the war in Ukraine, openly waged by Russia starting in 2022. Ukrainian and Belarusian anarchists complained about not being understood in their support for the fight against Russia – the latter then organized a commemorative event for the Russian anarchist historian Dmitry Petrov, who died on the front fighting Russia after having participated in Maidan and Rojava.

==== Conflicts ====
A major conflict at this gathering arose concerning the sale, at the stand of the Francophone Anarchist Federation (FAF), one of the organizations behind the event, of a book by Hamid Zanaz entitled L'Impasse islamique with a foreword by Michel Onfray, a French author who initially described himself as being on the left before moving towards the far-right. Following discussions between FAF members and dissatisfied anarchists, where the former refused to withdraw the book, the stand was attacked by several hooded individuals, who stole these and other books. The FAF condemned these actions, declaring that such practices are not legitimate between anarchists and that their attempts at discussion would have been impossible, while one person involved stated that one of the main problems during these meetings lay with the FAF, which allegedly refused to discuss or consider withdrawing the book, in a particularly tense context just after the killing of Nahel Merzouk, less than a month earlier. The Swiss journalist Boris Engelson noted the differentiated treatment of Onfray, as it would have been impossible to find publications by Daniel Cohn-Bendit, Ayn Rand, or Peter Thiel, other figures whose affiliation with the anarchist movement is highly doubtful or who have distanced themselves from it, with Cohn-Bendit being particularly ill-regarded.

== Legacy ==
=== Reception in Saint-Imier ===
The residents of Saint-Imier were generally satisfied with the event and proud of the anarchist history linked to their commune.

== Bibliography ==
- Baker, Zoe (2023), Means and Ends: The Revolutionary Practice of Anarchism in Europe and the United States, Edinburgh: AK Press, ISBN 978-1-84935-498-1
- Levy, Carl (2019), The Palgrave Handbook of Anarchism, Cham: Palgrave Macmillan, ISBN 978-3-319-75619-6
