= Cénit =

Spanish sociology and literary magazine in France (1951–1996)

- Categories: Sociology magazine; Literary magazine
- Frequency: Bimonthly; Quarterly
- Publisher: Confederación Nacional del Trabajo
- Founded: 1951
- Final issue: October 1996
- Country: France
- Based in: Toulouse
- Language: Spanish
- ISSN: 0754-0566
- OCLC: 801836475

Cénit was a magazine which was founded by the exiled leftist Catalan political figures and published in Toulouse, France, between 1951 and 1996. Its subtitle was Revista de Sociología, Ciencia y Literatura (Spanish: Journal of Sociology, Science and Literature).

== History and profile ==
Cénit was launched in 1951 by the Spanish political exiles who had left Spain following the capture of Barcelona by the Francoist forces in 1939. It was based in Toulouse and published by Confederación Nacional del Trabajo (Spanish: National Labour Confederation). From its start to 1971 the magazine came out bimonthly, and then its frequency was switched to quarterly. One of its editors was Federica Montseny. Salvador Cano Carrillo, a Spanish militant anarchist, was among the contributors. In 1954 the magazine received contributions from Benito Milla. It folded in October 1996.

The title of a Swedish leftist magazine, Zenith, was a reference to Cénit.
