= Salon, Dordogne =

Salon
- Commune
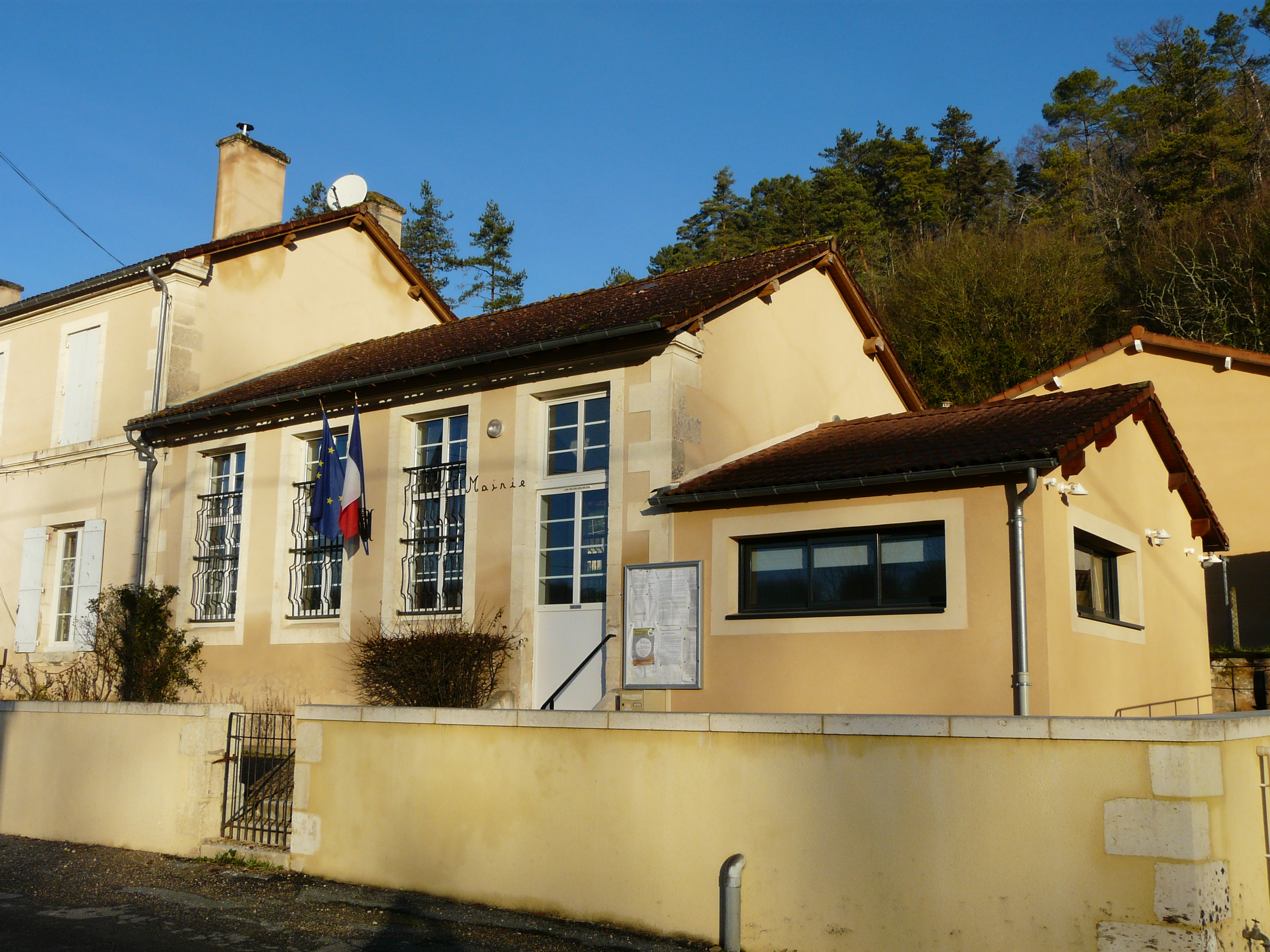
- The town hall in Salon
- Location of Salon
- Location within France Location within Nouvelle-Aquitaine
- Coordinates: 45°01′15″N 0°46′24″E
- Country: France
- Region: Nouvelle-Aquitaine
- Department: Dordogne
- Arrondissement: Périgueux
- Canton: Périgord Central
- Intercommunality: Le Grand Périgueux

Government
  - Mayor (2020–2026): Cécile Massoubre-Mareillaud
- Area^{1}: 16.97 km^{2} (6.55 sq mi)
- Elevation: 148 m (486 ft)
- Highest elevation: 246 m (807 ft)
- Lowest elevation: 131 m (430 ft)
- Population (2023): 261
  - Density: 15.4/km^{2} (39.8/sq mi)
- Time zone: UTC+01:00 (CET)
  - Summer (DST): UTC+02:00 (CEST)
- INSEE/Postal code: 24518 /24380
- ^{1} French Land Register data, which excludes lakes, ponds, glaciers > 1 km^{2} (0.386 sq mi or 247 acres) and river estuaries.

Salon (French pronunciation: [salɔ̃]) is a commune in the Dordogne department in Nouvelle-Aquitaine in southwestern France.

== Population ==
Historical population
Year	Pop.	±% p.a.
1968	207	—
1975	204	−0.21%
1982	205	+0.07%
1990	213	+0.48%
1999	234	+1.05%
2007	244	+0.52%
2012	261	+1.36%
2017	277	+1.20%
2023	261	−0.99%
Source: INSEE

== See also ==
- Communes of the Dordogne department
