= Joan Montseny =

Spanish anarchist and journalist (1864–1942)

Joan Montseny i Carret
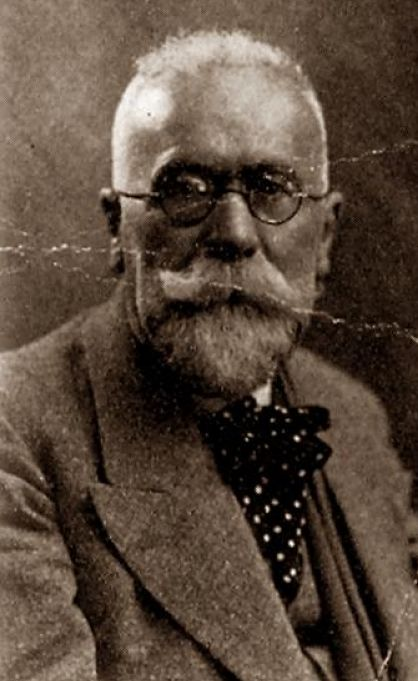
- Born: 1864; Reus, Spain
- Died: 1942 (aged 77–78); Salon, France
- Other name: Federico Urales
- Occupation: Journalist
- Known for: Anarchist activism
- Spouse: Teresa Mañé i Miravet
- Children: Frederica Montseny i Mañé

Joan Montseny i Carret (1864–1942), who also wrote under the pseudonym Federico Urales, was a Catalan anarchist activist and journalist from Spain.

== Early life and career ==
Joan Montseny was born in Reus, Spain, in 1864. He was originally a cooper and led a union of coopers in the late 1880s. Montseny studied to become a teacher and ran a school in his hometown in 1891. In the early 1890s, Montseny's activity in the anarchist movement led to several arrests and his involvement in the Montjuïc trial and subsequent June 1897 exile to London, though later that year, he illegally returned to Madrid to press for judicial review of the trial.

Montseny became a journalist. He worked on Alejandro Lerroux's El Progreso before founding the periodicals La Revista Blanca (1898) and Tierra y Libertad (1902). The success of these publications led to relationships with notable intellectuals, though Montseny was forced away from the papers in 1905 and 1904, respectively. He split his time between Madrid and Barcelona, writing for Miguel Moya's El Liberal. He defended Francisco Ferrer in the Morral affair and wrote books for Ferrer's Escuela Moderna, including the Castilian novel, Sembrando Flores (1906). In the Primo de Rivera administration, Montseny settled in Barcelona and restarted La Revista Blanca, which he ran between 1923 and 1936. He campaigned for social revolution by starting the weekly magazine El Luchador (1931–1933). Montseny also wrote under the pseudonym Federica Urales.

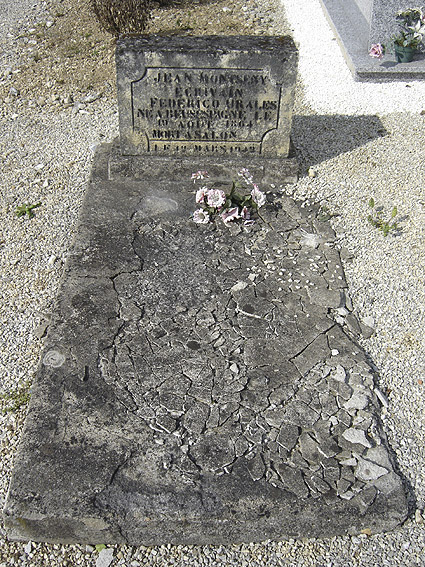
Tombstone

He followed an individualistic anarchism with no specific revolutionary program. He is a prominent example of the anarchism without adjectives school of thought. His family's orthodox anarchism chafed against the syndicalism of the Confederación Nacional del Trabajo (CNT) labor union. He supported but did not join the Federación Anarquista Ibérica (FAI) during the Second Republic. He nevertheless influenced the CNT as a member of the Popular Front in 1936 and through his daughter, Federica Montseny, who served in Francisco Largo Caballero's cabinet. Exiled to southwestern France in 1939, Montseny died in 1942.

== Personal life ==
In 1891, Montseny married Teresa Mañé, also known by pen name Soledad Gustavo. Together with their daughter, they were a family of orthodox anarchists.

== Selected works ==
- El sindicalismo español y su orientación (Spanish Syndicalism and Its Orientation, 1923)
- La anarquía al alcance de todos (Anarchism for All, 1928)
- Los municipios libres (1932)
- El ideal y la revolución (The Ideal and the Revolution, 1932)
- La evolución de la filosofía en España (The Evolution of Philosophy in Spain, 1934, two volumes)

Autobiography

- Mi vida (1932, three volumes)

Novels

- Sembrando Flores (1906)
- Los hijos del amor (1922)
- Los grandes delincuentes (1923)

Collections

- La Novela Ideal (1925–1937)
- La Novela Libre (1929–1937)

== See also ==
- Anarchism in Spain
