= International of Anarchist Federations =

Anarchist organization

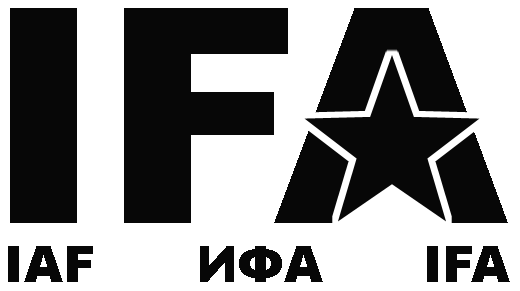

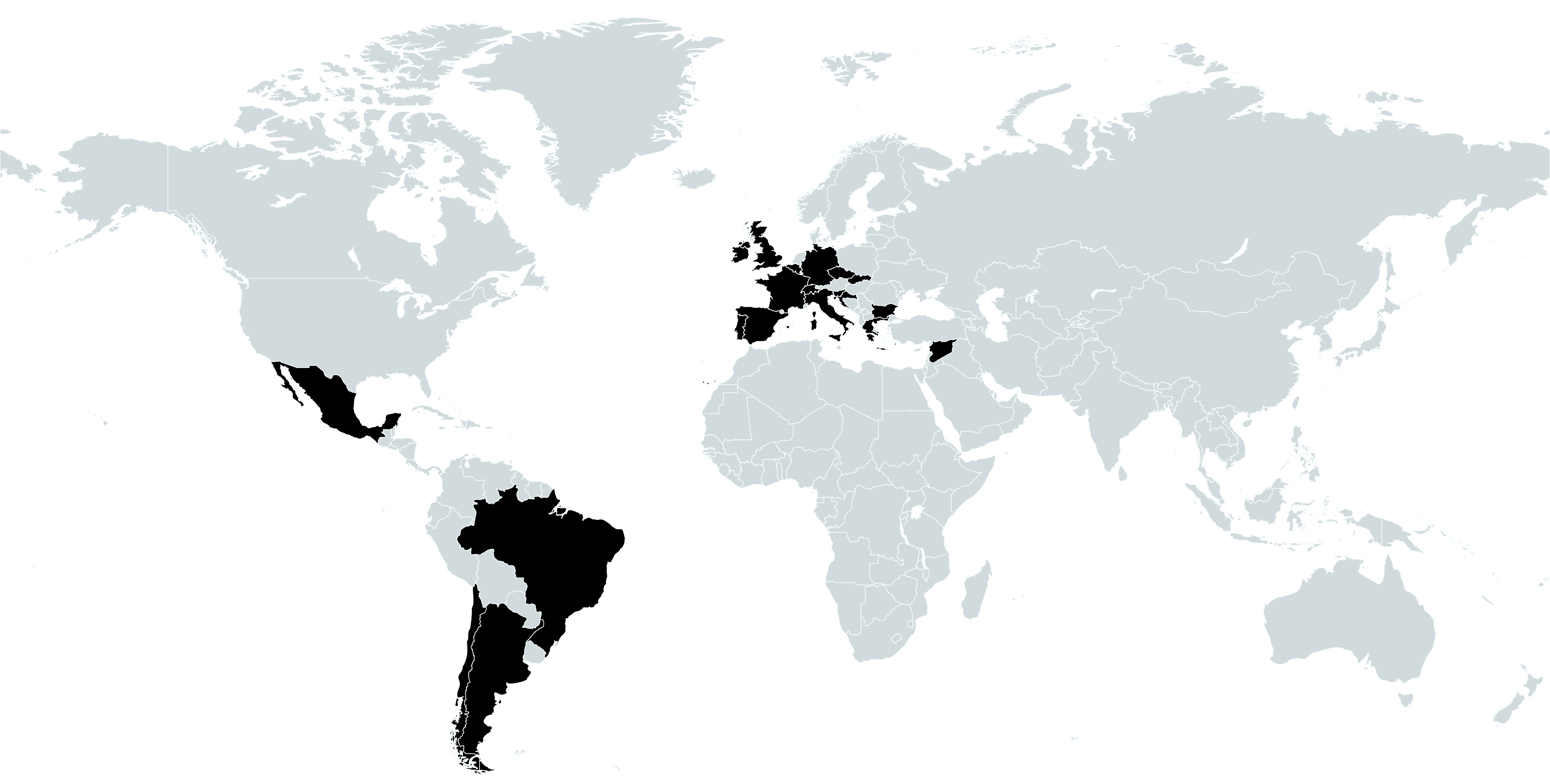
- Anarchist federations members of the IAF in 2026
- Abbreviation: IAF
- Formation: September 5, 1968; 58 years ago
- Founded at: Carrara, Italy
- Location: Active in at least 19 countries
- Methods: Organizing cultural and militant activities Providing a platform to meet other anarchists Organizing congresses
- Members: Unknown; able to unite up to 5,000+ anarchists at Anarchy 2023
- Affiliations: Anarchism
- Website: https://i-f-a.org/

The International of Anarchist Federations (IAF) is an international anarchist organization founded by the Carrara Congress (1968). It is based on the principle of anarchist synthesis, which means it seeks to unite all tendencies of anarchism within the same organization. It is subdivided into anarchist federations at the national, regional, or local level, which in turn participate in the International.

The IAF organizes congresses every four years which serve as a gathering and a place of expression for the anarchist movement. It is one of the principal anarchist organizations at the beginning of the 21st century.

== History ==
=== Context ===
==== Birth of anarchism and first organizations ====
In the 19th century, the development of capitalism saw the formation of several opposing political ideologies and movements, particularly anarchism, Marxism, and socialism. Anarchists advocate for the struggle against all forms of domination perceived as unjust, among which is economic domination, with the development of capitalism. They are particularly opposed to the State, viewed as the institution enabling the endorsement of many of these dominations through its police, army, and propaganda. They want to replace the State and capitalism by equalitarian, voluntary, stateless societies.

During the 1880s, the Anti-authoritarian International, a foundational organisation in anarchist history—which brought together a major part of the anarchists and provided important theoretical foundations for the movement—disappeared. It was replaced by other systems of organisation among anarchists, notably companionship and, later, anarcho-syndicalism.

==== Birth and spread of the anarchist synthesis ====
From the 1920s until approximately the 1940s, intense debates traversed anarchist circles regarding their modes of organisation. Two positions emerged and opposed each other: on the one hand, Platformism, promoted by Nestor Makhno, argued that anarchists should gather in an organisation with a clear and restricted political line; on the other hand, Synthesis, promoted by Errico Malatesta, Volin or Sébastien Faure, considered that to unite all anarchist tendencies in one organisation, it must be open to and inclusively gather all these currents.

Within the framework of these theoretical oppositions, and in response to the reformism of the CNT in the late 1920s, the first anarchist federation of the Synthesis line was born: the Iberian Anarchist Federation (FAI), founded in 1927. The Francophone Anarchist Federation (FAF) was founded in 1937, and other similar organisations spread throughout the world, in Japan or Korea, for example.

=== Founding of the IAF and subsequent history ===
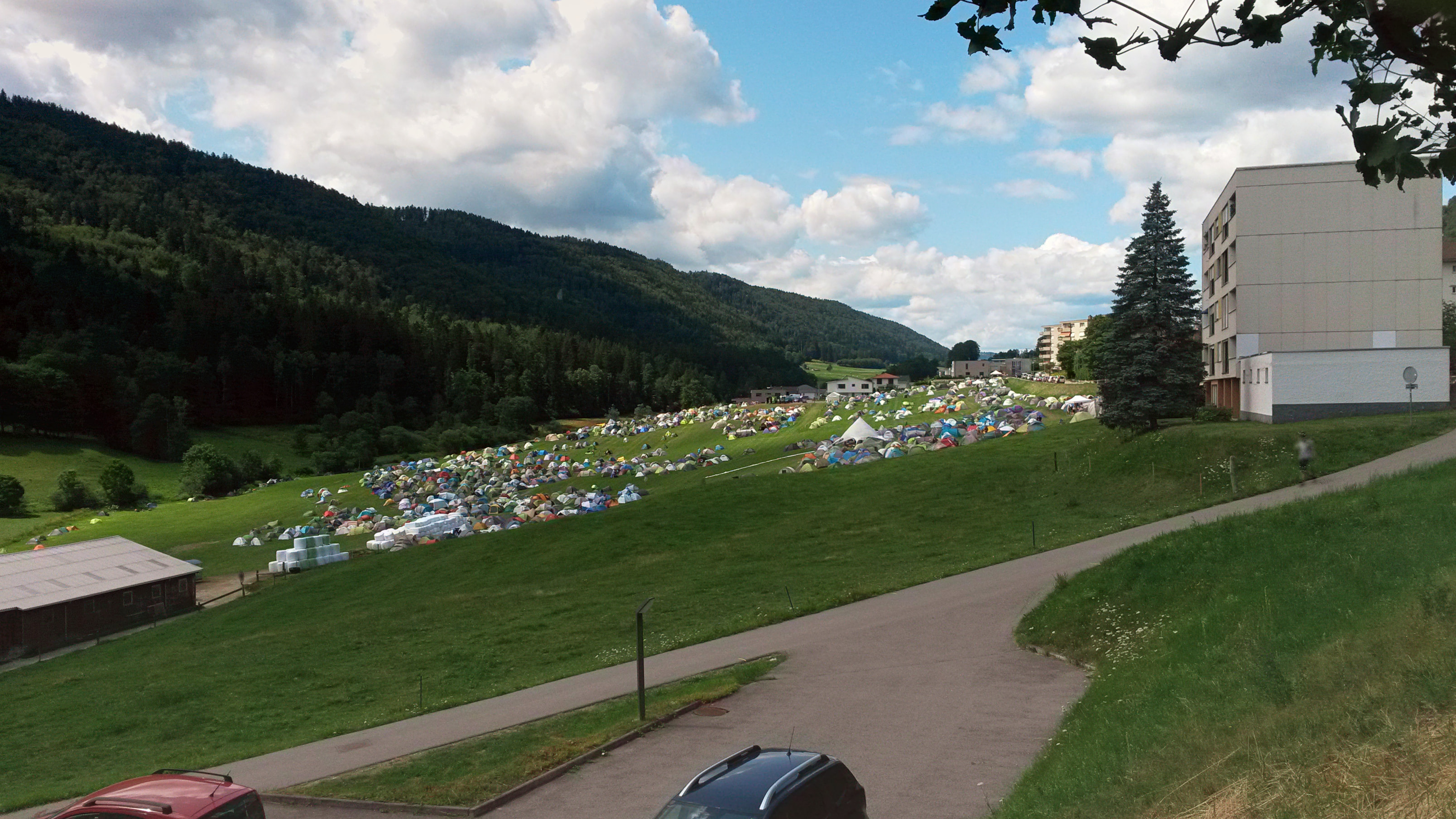
Main camping location of Anarchy 2023, one of the largest anarchist gatherings of the 21st century

In 1968, the International of Anarchist Federations (IAF) was established at the congress of Carrara, building on the previously established international network at the initiative of the FAF, the FAI, the FAIt and the Bulgarian Federation in exile.

Established along synthesist lines, the IAF brought together anarchist federations from Argentina, Australia, Britain, Bulgaria, Cuba, France, Germany, Greece, Iberia, Italy, Japan, the Netherlands, Norway and Switzerland. The IAF affirmed its commitment to the principles of anarcho-communism at its second congress in 1971, but soon lost its Cuban section due to its soft line on the Castro government. Nevertheless, the IAF managed to develop further links in Hong Kong and Vietnam and made contact with other anarchist federations in Europe and South America.

According to the historian Ruth Kinna, the organization is part of the tradition of the First International and adopts principles of decentralized federation and group autonomy to strengthen local struggles. She writes that their goal is:

The abolition of all forms of authority, whether economical, political, social, religious, cultural or sexual, the construction of a free society, without classes or States or frontiers, founded on anarchist federalism and mutual aid.

== Congresses and gatherings ==
The IAF holds congresses every 4 years. The last ones were the following:

- Congress of Besançon, France, 2004
- 8th Congress of Carrara, Italy, 2008
- Congress of Saint-Imier, Switzerland, 2012
- Congress of Frankfurt, Germany, 2016
- Congress of Ljubljana, Slovenia, 2019
- Congress of Massenzatico, Italy, 2023
- Congress of Athens, Greece, 2026

The IAF was also involved, especially through the FAF, in organizing Anarchy 2023, to celebrate the 150 years since the founding of the Anti-authoritarian International. This was arguably the biggest anarchist gathering of the 21st century, uniting more than 5,000 of them.

== Members ==
As of 2026, the groups and federations which are members of the IAF are as follows:

Zone	Name	Acronym	Publications	Website
Argentina	Federación Libertaria Argentina	FLA	El Libertario	?
Belgium France Switzerland	Francophone Anarchist Federation	FA/FAF	Le Monde libertaire	
Brazil	Iniciativa Federalista Anarquista no Brasil	IFAb	?	
(United Kingdom) Britain	Anarchist Federation	AF / AFed	Organise! and Resistance	?
Bulgaria	Federation of Anarchists in Bulgaria	ФАБ / FAKB	Svobodna misŭl	
Croatia Slovenia	Federation for Anarchist Organizing	FAO	Avtonomija, Anarhistka, Stavka and Društvo otpora	
Czech Republic Slovakia	Anarchistická federace	AF	Existence, Klíčení, Zdola and A3	
Germany Switzerland	Federation of German-speaking Anarchists	FdA	Gǎi Dào	
Greece	Anarchist Political Organisation	APO / ΑΠΟ	?	
Italy	Italian Anarchist Federation	FAI/FAIt	Umanità Nova	
(Kurdistan Region) Kurdistan	Kurdish Anarchist Forum	KAF	?	?
Mexico	Federation of Anarchists in Mexico	FAM	?	
Portugal Spain	Iberian Anarchist Federation	FAI	Tierra y Libertad	
Sicily	Sicilian Anarchist Federation	FAS	?	

== Bibliography ==
- Avrich, Paul (1971) [1967]. The Russian Anarchists. Princeton: Princeton University Press. ISBN 0-691-00766-7. OCLC 1154930946.
- Baker, Zoe (2023), Means and Ends: The Revolutionary Practice of Anarchism in Europe and the United States, Edinburgh: AK Press, ISBN 978-1-84935-498-1
- Berthier, René (2015), La fin de la première Internationale [The end of the First Internationale] (in French), Paris: Le Monde Libertaire, ISBN 978-2915514636
- Jourdain, Edouard (2013). L'anarchisme [Anarchism]. Paris: La Découverte. ISBN 978-2-7071-9091-8.
- Kinna, Ruth (2019), The Government of No One: The Theory and Practice of Anarchism, United Kingdom: Penguin, pp. 136–137, ISBN 9780141984674
- van der Walt, Lucien; Schmidt, Michael (2009). "Militant Minority: The Question of Anarchist Political Organisation". Black Flame: The Revolutionary Class Politics of Anarchism and Syndicalism. Edinburgh: AK Press. pp. 239–267. ISBN 978-1-904859-16-1. LCCN 2006933558. OCLC 1100238201.
- Schmidt, Michael (2013) [2012]. Cartography of Revolutionary Anarchism. Edinburgh: AK Press. ISBN 978-1849351386. OCLC 881111188.
- Ward, Colin (2004). Anarchism: A Very Short Introduction. Oxford University Press (OUP).
