= Anti-authoritarian International =

Political party (1872–81)

Anti-Authoritarian International
- Founded: September 1872
- Dissolved: July 1881
- Preceded by: First International; International Alliance of Socialist Democracy
- Succeeded by: Black International
- Ideology: Anarchism under various tendencies, including some in early forms: Collectivist anarchism; Anarcho-communism; Anti-authoritarianism; Illegalism; Revolutionary syndicalism; Insurrectionary anarchism
- Political position: Far-left

The International Workingmen's Association (IWA), known historiographically as the Anti-authoritarian International to distinguish it from the First International (1864-1872) that preceded it and the rival Marxist International (1872–1876), refers to the anti-authoritarian and anarchist branch of the First International. Active between 1872 and 1881, it is both one of the earliest anarchist organizations in history and one of the most significant in terms of theoretical, ideological, and historical influence.

Born out of the schism within the First International during the Hague and Saint-Imier congresses, it gradually brought together a majority of the First International's members and federations, while its Marxist rival faded away. During its short decade of existence, it served as a birthplace and anchor of the anarchist movement, already containing many of the multiple tendencies and orientations that would shape the movement in the following decades, such as collectivist anarchism, anarcho-communism, illegalism, insurrectionary anarchism, anarcho-syndicalism, etc.

By the late 1870s, faced with repression and shifting ideological discussions and interests, the organization declined and was eventually replaced, by a number of its members, by the Black International (1881–1887). Since its disappearance, several anarchist organizations, such as the International Workers' Association (1922–present) or the International of Anarchist Federations (1968–present), retook parts of its legacy.

== History ==
=== Context : Conflicts within the First International ===
The International Workingmen's Association (IWA), or the First International, was a workers' association founded in London in 1864. It was a fundamental organization in the history of the workers' movement, quickly bringing together many figures linked to its history, such as Karl Marx, Mikhail Bakunin, James Guillaume, Friedrich Engels, Errico Malatesta, and Carlo Cafiero. Different political movements were represented, ranging from Marxism to anarchism, as well as more moderate socialists and Proudhonists.

Between the late 1860s and the early 1870s, the Marxist and Blanquist factions allied against the anti-authoritarian/anarchist faction. These conflicts were both theoretical and personal, with each faction seeking to tip the International in its own direction. Marx enjoyed the support of the organization's General Council, while Bakunin was backed by the Jurassian, Belgian, Italian, Spanish federations, the latter of which, at the time, made up a large part of the International on its own.

=== Hague and Saint-Imier Congresses : mutual exclusions, effective schism within the First International and historiographical birth of the Anti-authoritarian International ===
These conflicts led Marx, who saw his position becoming increasingly marginalized within the organization, to attempt to 'purge' the anti-authoritarians/anarchists in September 1872 before it fell under their control. Consequently, he convened the Hague Congress, which was conducted using questionable methods, and expelled Bakunin and the most prominent members of his faction from the International.

A few days after this congress, Bakunin and his side of the International, organized the Saint-Imier Congress, which expelled Marx and his allies from the International in return. They signed a federative pact establishing the autonomy of the International's member federations from the General Council, which was stripped of its authority. While it was not initially envisioned as a purely anarchist organization, aiming instead to welcome all anti-authoritarian socialists, regardless of their faction, the congress adopted fundamental tenets of anarchist ideology, declaring:

1. That the destruction of all political power is the first duty of the proletariat;
2. That any organisation of a supposedly provisional and revolutionary political power to bring about this destruction can only be another deception and would be as dangerous to the proletariat as all the governments existing today;
3. That, rejecting all compromise to achieve the realisation of the Social Revolution, proletarians of every land must establish solidarity of revolutionary action outside of all bourgeois politics.

These three points, which have since often been reiterated and synthesise a part of anarchist ideology, were not truly central to the delegates of that period, who were much more interested in the question of the federative pact, thus, the organisation was relatively open to socialists during its early years.

This congress marked the historiographical birth of the Anti-authoritarian International, while the rival faction became known as the Marxist International (1872–1876), with both claiming to be the First International. In general, the majority of members and federations joined the Anti-authoritarian International in the following years while the Marxist International decreased and ultimately disappeared.

=== The Congress of Geneva (September, 1873) ===
In September 1873 the International held its Second Congress in Geneva (officially the Sixth General Congress since it was considered the legitimate heir to the IWA founded in London in 1864). It coincided with the Congress held by the Marxists in the same city, although theirs was a failure since only a small number of regional federations participated and the General Council could not attend due to lack of funds. On the other hand, the anarchist Congress, inaugurated on September 1, was attended by delegates from Britain, Switzerland, France, the Netherlands, Belgium and Spain. A federation from the United States also announced its accession.

Congress agreed to the dissolution of the General Council and it was proposed that the next Congress be held in Spain, but the Spanish delegate José García Viñas opposed it because he thought that within a year "Spain will be in full social revolution or in full reaction." Regarding the issues that were debated, he highlighted the general strike issue, with which, according to the proposal, "the revolutionary solidarity between the different localities and regions would be effective; understanding that the workers should be ready to go on strike to prevent the concentration of the forces of the bourgeoisie on the points or regions where a revolutionary movement would break out." On this subject Congress agreed as follows:

[Seen] the very serious inconveniences that the organization of a general strike has in itself, more than anything, due to the obstacles presented by the workers who, having not yet taken charge of their position [...] become instruments of the bourgeoisie, lacking the duty of solidarity with the other exploited [...] [it was decided] to recommend to the sections that they renounce as much as possible the partial strike [...] that they do so that the resistance movements [...] are by Federations ex officio, and that they seek to promote the organization for the struggle not only in the field of economic solidarity against capital, but also in the field of revolutionary solidarity against all kinds of exploitation [sic].

=== The Congresses of Brussels (1874), Bern (1876), Verviers and Gand (1877) ===
Anti-authoritarian International and anarchist groups along the French-Swiss border in the early 1880s.

The next two congresses were held in Brussels between September 7 and 13, 1874 and in Bern in October 1876. In the latter a proposal was debated to open the following congress to delegates from non-anarchist organizations, which was opposed by the representatives of the Italian and Spanish federations if the following principle was not accepted: "The International is the only existing organization that truly represents popular socialism; therefore we believe that our Association should be represented in the socialist congress, not to merge into a new organization, but only to defend its principles and its means of action and try to attract the workers' organizations that have not yet entered its ranks." Once this was approved, a comprehensive Congress was convened to be held in September 1877 in Ghent, although shortly before that Anti-Authoritarian International would meet in Verviers. Regarding the convocation of the comprehensive congress in Ghent from which "a new International could result," a clandestine Spanish anarchist newspaper warned that "such a thing would be tantamount to supposing that the congress, forgetting the lofty mission entrusted to it, would occupy itself with such perfectly superfluous things as how to claim the formation of a new International, since it exists, it has its magnificent organization and its circle is wide enough to accommodate all men of good will and all workers' organizations that aspire to the complete emancipation of the proletariat."

In Verviers, the radicalization of the anarchist movement was observed, increasingly inclined towards positions favorable to the use of violence under the influence of Russian populism and nihilism, and which took shape in the approval of the policy of "propaganda of the deed". Hence, the congress showed its "sympathy and solidarity" with the attacks in Saint Petersburg and with the Italian insurrection in Benevento.

On the other hand, in the Congress of Verviers for the first time debate was raised between collectivist anarchism, the dominant doctrine until then in the anarchist movement - and which was based on the writings of Bakunin, who had died the previous year - and anarcho-communism defended by a new anarchist generation, including the Russian Peter Kropotkin, the Italian Errico Malatesta and the French Élisée Reclus. Thus, while the collectivists defended the principle "from each according to his ability, to each according to his work", anarcho-communists proposed the principle "from each according to his ability, to each according to his needs". In the Congress it was agreed after an intense debate that each Regional Federation would decide which option to follow. The Spanish Regional Federation, for example, remained faithful to collectivist anarchism, but anarcho-communism began to spread between certain federations and sections, especially in Andalusia.

The Spanish anarchist Anselmo Lorenzo wrote years later that he considered that:

The International Workingmen's Association ceased to exist materially in the Congress of Verviers [...] It was so dead in fact [...] that the Spanish Federal Commission could not exchange a single letter with the entity in charge of the international office.

=== Later years and evolutions (1877-1881) ===
The Anti-authoritarian International held its last congress in 1880. Following this congress, the next year, a number of figures from the Anti-authoritarian International, such as Peter Kropotkin and Errico Malatesta, participated in the London Congress, held in 1881 in the eponymous city. This congress decided to dismantle all visible organizational structures of the Anti-authoritarian International and adopt an insurrectionary program based on propaganda of the deed. Historiographically, this evolution gave birth to the Black International (1881-1887 ?).

== Legacy ==
=== Massive ideological influence on anarchism ===
Although initially not perceived as a purely anarchist organization, the Anti-Authoritarian International gradually evolved toward these positions. During its decade of existence as the first or one of the first anarchist organizations, it developed numerous theoretical and practical principles that have since become foundational for anarchists.

Thus, virtually every subsequent trend within the movement, such as insurrectionary anarchism, anarcho-communism, anarcho-syndicalism, illegalism, and others, was represented within the organization, which began to develop or create them in an embryonic form. Its influence on the anarchist movement remains considerable.

=== Organizations and groups using the International legacy ===
A further attempt to create a lasting international organization was made in Amsterdam in 1907 by an International Anarchist Congress, though this would have an even briefer life than the IWPA.

Contemporary anarchist internationals include the anarcho-syndicalist International Workers' Association (established 1922), the International of Anarchist Federations (est. 1968), and Black Bridge International (est. 2001).

In August 2012, the International Anarchism Gathering took place in St. Imier, partly as a commemoration of the 1872 St. Imier congress. Eleven years later, Anarchy 2023 took place to celebrate the 150th anniversary of the first St. Imier Congress.

== Congresses ==
- 14–16 September 1872: Saint-Imier; 5th Congress
- 1–6 September 1873: Geneva; 6th Congress
- 7–12 September 1874: Brussels; 7th Congress
- 26–29 September 1876: Bern; 8th Congress
- 6–8 September 1877: Verviers; 9th Congress

== Other anarchist internationals and international networks ==
- International Working People's Association (1881–1887)
- International Workers' Association (1922–)
- International of Anarchist Federations (1968–)
- International Libertarian Solidarity (2001–2005)
- Anarkismo.net (2005–)

== See also ==
- International Anarchist Congresses
- St. Imier

== Documents about the Anti-authoritarian International ==
=== Police files ===
Collection of the site-archive Archives Anarchistes uploaded to Commons comprising, among others:

- From the Archives de la PP de Paris : Ba 427, Ba 434, Ba 435 (1), Ba 435 (3), Ba 435 (4), Ba 436, Ba 437 (1), Ba 437 (2), Ba 438 (1), Ba 438 (2), Ba 438 (3), Ba 438 (4), Ba 438 (5), Ba 438 (6), Ba 438 (7), Ba 438 (8), Ba 439 (1), Ba 439 (2), Ba 439 (3), Ba 439 (4), Ba 439 (5).

== Bibliography ==
- Baker, Zoe (2023), Means and Ends: The Revolutionary Practice of Anarchism in Europe and the United States, Edinburgh: AK Press, ISBN 978-1-84935-498-1
- Bébin, Lionel (1996), Les tentatives de reconstituer la Première Internationale et les débuts du mouvement anarchiste à Lyon (mémoire) [The Attempts to Reconstruct the First International and the Beginnings of the Anarchist Movement in Lyon, 1871–1881 (memoir)], Lyon: University Lyon II
- Carlson, Andrew (1972), Anarchism in Germany, vol. 1, Metuchen, N. J.: The Scarecrow Press, Inc., ISBN 0-8 108-0484-0
- Enckell, Marianne (2012), La Fédération jurassienne, Genève - Paris: Entremonde, ISBN 978-2-940426-16-4
- Graham, Robert (2019), "Anarchism and the First International", The Palgrave Handbook of Anarchism, Loughborough, UK: Palgrave Macmillan, pp. 325–343, ISBN 978-3-319-75619-6
- Guillaume, James (1906), L'Internationale : Documents et souvenirs (1864-1878) (t. 1-2) [L'Internationale : memories and documents], vol. 2, Paris: Société nouvelle de librairie et d'édition
- Lida, Clara E. (2010). "La Primera Internacional en España, entre la organización pública y la clandestinidad (1868-1889)". In Julián Casanova (ed.). Tierra y Libertad. Cien años de anarquismo en España (in Spanish). Barcelona: Crítica. pp. 33–59. ISBN 978-84-9892-119-9.
- Nomad, Max (1966). "The Anarchist Tradition". In Drachkovitch, Milorad M. (ed.). The Revolutionary Internationals, 1864–1943. Stanford University Press. pp. 57–92. LCCN 66015299.
- Steklov, Yuri (1928). History of The First International. Translated by Paul, Cedar; Paul, Eden. London: Martin Lawrence. OCLC 5105813.
- Termes, Josep (1977). Anarquismo y sindicalismo en España. La Primera Internacional (1864-1881) (in Spanish). Barcelona: Crítica. ISBN 84-7423-023-3.
- Termes, Josep (2011). Historia del anarquismo en España (1870-1980) (in Spanish). Barcelona: RBA. ISBN 978-84-9006-017-9.
- Tuñón de Lara, Manuel (1977) [1972]. El movimiento obrero en la historia de España. I.1832-1899 (in Spanish) (2 ed.). Barcelona: Laia. ISBN 84-7222-331-0.
