= Argentine Libertarian Federation =

Argentine anarchist organization

- Federación Libertaria Argentina
- Abbreviation: FLA
- Formation: October 1935; 91 years ago
- Purpose: Anarchism, libertarian communism
- Headquarters: Buenos Aires
- Location: Argentina
- Publication: El Libertario
- Affiliations: International of Anarchist Federations
- Website: federacionlibertariaargentina.org
- Formerly called: Anarcho-Communist Federation of Argentina

The Argentine Libertarian Federation (in Spanish, Federación Libertaria Argentina, FLA) is a libertarian communist federation which operates in Argentina, out of the City of Buenos Aires, San Pedro, La Pampa Province, and Rosario. Founded in October 1935 with the name of the Anarcho-Communist Federation of Argentina (FACA, Federación Anarco-Comunista Argentina) the FLA adopted its current name in 1955. It is governed by the Declaration of Principles and the Organic Charter approved by its congress. Its structure and operation are federative and are coordinated by Local Councils and the National Council.

Since 1985, the FLA has been publishing the political journal El Libertario. Prior to that, FLA published Acción Libertaria. The FLA is a member of the International of Anarchist Federations (IAF-IFA), the anarchist international which includes member organisations from Italy, Spain, Great Britain, France, Germany and other nations.

== History ==
In October 1935, the Federación Libertaria Argentina was founded in La Plata as the Anarcho-Communist Federation of Argentina (Spanish: Federación Anarco-Comunista Argentina, FACA) as a continuation of the Regional Committee for Anarchist Relations (Spanish: Comité Regional de Relaciones Anarquistas, CRRA), an anarchist assembly that had met since 1932. The FACA was the first specifically anarchist organization in the country.

It established its headquarters in Buenos Aires, and undertook multiple activities in various parts of the country, continuing those previously carried out by the CRRA. One of the first relevant activities it carried out was its participation in the campaign for the freedom of the Bragado Prisoners: Pascual Vuotto, Reclus de Diago and Santiago Mainini were anarchists that had been arbitrarily detained and tortured by the police during the Infamous Decade, falsely accused of having planted a bomb in the town of Bragado on 5 August 1931.

=== Spanish Civil War ===
Less than a year after the FLA was founded, on 19 July 1936, the Spanish social revolution took place, in the context of the Spanish Civil War launched after the failed coup by nationalist and fascist sectors of the Spanish Army on 17 July. In response, different organizations and parties, both communists and anarchists, formed solidarity committees with the Spanish Republic against the military coup. The Coordinating Commission for Aid to Spain was then formed and, for its part, FACA promoted the creation of Solidaridad Internacional Antifascista (SIA) and actively participated in the Spanish Propaganda Service founded by the CNT-FAI, appointing and sending delegates from the Federation. Anita Piacenza, Jacobo Prince, Jacobo Maguid and José Grunfeld went to Catalonia to represent the FLA and gave support to the different libertarian organizations in that region, they directed and collaborated in the CNT newspaper Solidaridad Obrera.

The first FACA delegate to arrive in Spain was Jacobo Maguid, who went to Catalonia in November 1936 to serve as head of the organizing committee of the International Anarchist Congress. He also worked actively in the FAI Regional Committee, on the newspaper Tierra y Libertad and in the magazine Tiempos Nuevos until December 1938.

This social revolution led many militants to participate directly in the conflict, traveling as combatants to Spain or in support tasks from Argentina. Hundreds of anarchists traveled to join the CNT and the FAI, including members of the FORA such as Diego Abad de Santillán and the FACA, such as Anita Piacenza, Jacobo Maguid, Jacobo Prince and José Grunfeld, among others.

== Activities ==
In its own premises, the Casa de los Libertarios, the federation carries out regular meetings, administration, attention to visitors and correspondence, it also has a bookstore, library and archive. Each year they hold conferences, round tables, book presentations, film and video exhibitions, commemorative events, fraternization meetings, artistic and musical evenings. Until the beginning of 1971, 210 issues of its journalistic organ Acción Libertaria were published. After a long interruption, from 1985 the newspaper El Libertario appeared as its mouthpiece.

Editorial Reconstruir, created and promoted by the FLA, has to its credit a large production of books and brochures, in addition to the bimonthly magazine of the same name published until 1976. Although with less intensity, it continues in the work of disseminating books and publishing works with his own stamp.

== See also ==
- Osvaldo Bayer
- Italian Anarchist Federation
- Fédération Anarchiste
- Iberian Anarchist Federation
