= La Revista Blanca =

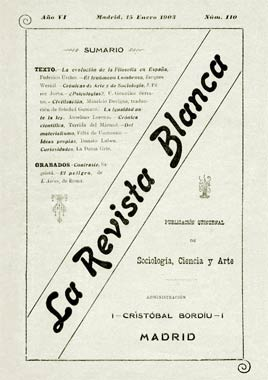
La Revista Blanca

La Revista Blanca was a Spanish individualist anarchist magazine of sociology and arts published in Madrid by Joan Montseny (Federico Urales) and Teresa Mañé (Soledad Gustavo) from 1898 to 1905 and in Barcelona from June 1923 to August 1936.

== Bibliography ==
- Madrigal Pascual, Arturo Ángel (2002). "Un espacio para el arte en las revistas anarquistas: La Revista Blanca, Revista Nueva y Generación Consciente". Arte y compromiso: España 1917-1936 (in Spanish). Madrid: Fundación de Estudios Libertarios Anselmo Lorenzo. pp. 125–131. ISBN 84-86864-52-6.
- Prado, Antonio (2011). Matrimonio, familia y estado: Escritoras anarco-feministas en La Revista Blanca (1898-1936) (in Spanish). Madrid: Fundación de Estudios Libertarios Anselmo Lorenzo. ISBN 978-84-86864-83-5.
