= Luigi Molinari =

Italian lawyer, anarchist and teacher (1866–1918)

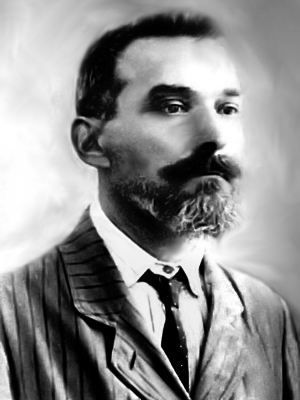
- Born: December 15, 1866; Crema, Italy
- Died: July 12, 1918 (aged 51); Milan, Italy
- Known for: L'Università popolare, Ferrer Modern Schools in Italy

Luigi Molinari (1866–1918) was an Italian anarchist, journalist, and lawyer known for publishing the libertarian periodical L'Università popolare and for his support for Ferrer Modern Schools in Italy.

== Early life and career ==
Luigi Molinari was born to Cesare and Giuseppa Caldaroli in Crema, northern Italy, on December 15, 1866. His family was wealthy and his father was a court official. After high school, Molinari studied law in Pisa, where he read Pietro Gori's Pensieri ribelli ("Rebel thoughts") and developed an affiliation with anarchism. He was also influenced by the internationalist Oreste Falleri. At the 1887 Italian Workers' Party Congress, he advocated for a revolutionary anarchist platform. He graduated in 1889 and moved to practice law in Mantua. The same year, Molinari led the internationalist newspaper La Favilla, which had been founded by Paride Suzzara Verdi to support the creation of local worker social cooperatives. Within two years, he started Il Grido dell'operaio ("The Worker's Scream"), which took a stark anarchist position against German Socialism. He also produced anarchist propaganda, spoke at Italian conferences, and on the anarcho-communist Peter Kropotkin. Molinari was ejected from the 1893 Zürich Socialist Congress and arrested for his role in talks preceding insurrection in Lunigiana, for which he was sentenced before military tribunal to 23 years of prison. The sentence was later reduced to seven and a half years, of which he would serve two years in Oneglia's prison. He was released in 1895 and moved to Marmirolo, where he cared for his father, practiced law, and remained under surveillance.

He became known for his work on the libertarian periodical L'Università popolare, which was published in Mantua and Milan between 1901 and 1918, which supported educational institutions by the same name in Italy and Scandinavia. Molinari promoted the works of evolutionist Charles Darwin, European positivists, and anarchist theorists such as Mikhail Bakunin and Kropotkin. He promoted debate on public education, divorce, cremation, militarism, women's rights. He advocated for broader education, including instruction on scientific thought, and civic consciousness as a better solution for crime than punitive criminal law. Molinari later published volumes on ancient history and Darwin's evolutionary theory, both with a focus on correcting popular misconceptions.

In 1906, Molinari moved to Milan and became a proponent of Spanish anarchist Francisco Ferrer's Escuela Moderna schools. Following Ferrer's execution in 1909, Molinari published the educator's life and works, La vita e le opere di F. Ferrer, and lectured on Ferrer's ideas across Italy and Switzerland. Three years later, a modern school in the Ferrer model formed in the small, northern Italy town of Clivio. Molinari created an organization to support Italian modern schools and encourage schools without state or religious dogma. The group was funded by Milan's Freemasons, who supported Molinari's secular aims, and railroad unions. Together they raised sufficient funds to open a modern school in Milan's Lambrate suburb, but it was shortly closed with the start of World War I.

Molinari spoke widely on his pacifism and opposition to war. He earlier lectured across the region to profess his pacifism in opposition to the 1911 Italo-Turkish War. With the World War, he contended that anarchists fought against war, proposed an international coalition against it, and wrote in criticism of interventionists, particularly anarchists interventionists: Kropotkin, Christiaan Cornelissen, and Charles Malato.

Molinari died on July 12, 1918, at home in Milan after suffering a stroke in a bookstore the day prior. Among his final works was an apologetic recounting of the Paris Commune to bring the events on par with the Russian Revolution. Marxist theorist Antonio Gramsci prominently debated Molinari's points. L'Università popolare published its last issue later that year in memory to Molinari.
