= New Unified School Council =

Organisation to coordinate public education during the 2nd Spanish Republic

- Consell de l'Escola Nova Unificada
- Abbreviation: CENU
- Predecessor: Modern School
- Formation: July 27, 1936; 90 years ago
- Founder: Joan Puig i Elias
- Dissolved: February 10, 1939; 87 years ago
- Headquarters: Barcelona

The New Unified School Council (Catalan: Consell de l'Escola Nova Unificada, CENU) was an education institution that was created on 27 July 1936 in Barcelona by Joan Puig i Elias, who was also its first president.

The aim was to create a new free, secular and co-educational school, with classes in Catalan, based on libertarian principles. The new school regime was inspired by rationalist principles of work, ensuring that all workers could arrive from the primary school to higher education according to their capacity.

The purpose of the decree that created CENU was to coordinate education and to organise buildings suitable for educational purposes. It was a considerable challenge when in 1930 there were 3049 schools in all of Catalonia and it took another 5641 to be able to meet the needs of literacy and basic education. The situation was comparable to the Balearic Islands (248 more schools were needed to be built) and the Valencian Country (2450 schools to be built). The pedagogical purpose was "to promulgate to all [students] a basic and solid culture that would convert them into men developed in all aspects, able to contribute on concrete activities, to the benefit of the individuals themselves and of the society in general".

The libertarian pedagogue and anarchist Joan Puig i Elias (1898–1972) was the initiator of the CENU, continuing the work of Francesc Ferrer i Guàrdia. He studied teaching at the Escola Normal de Barcelona and obtained the title of teacher in 1919. His pedagogy aimed to put the child at the center of education and to educate not only reason but also feelings, in constant contact with nature. Affiliated to the Confederación Nacional del Trabajo (CNT) from his youth, from 1932 he chaired the section of teachers of the Union of Intellectuals and Liberal Professionals of Barcelona (Sindicat d'intel·lectuals i Professionals Liberals de Barcelona). In July 1936 he held the presidency of the New Unified School Council. The institution was dissolved in February 1939 by the Francoist dictatorship.

== The New School and the Council ==
=== History ===
Most anarchist educators referenced the pedagogue Francesc Ferrer i Guardia, who had been executed in 1909 as a scapegoat for the insurrection known as the Tragic Week. As a result of his influence on education, creating the so-called Modern School, numerous rationalist schools had been created throughout the country. Especially in Catalonia, rationalist education had many supporters in the labor movement. Joan Puig i Elías, the education counselor of the Central Committee of Antifascist Militias (CCMA), came from this tradition.

The New Unified School Council was created as a result of the Spanish Revolution of 1936, its goal being to organise the new teaching system, "ensuring that it responded, in all the aspects, to the new order imposed by the will of the workers”. Its Committee was made up of delegates from trade unions and left-wing political parties. CENU was created in the spirit of anti-fascist unity, which had led to the creation of the CCMA itself as well as its Economic Council, which little by little would be in charge of promoting industrial communities and the socialisation of the economy. The Executive Committee of CENU was chaired by the already appointed Joan Puig i Elias.

On 27 July 1936, the New Unified School Council was established. Its decree of creation affirmed its will to suppress the confessional school (in the hands of the Church), which was accused of being the type of educational system that had caused the military coup. CENU's founders believed in a new school that promoted rationalistic principles and solidarity. In addition to these intentions, the anarchists - in charge of this council - realised that they did not have enough teachers or sufficient infrastructure to offer a teaching based on libertarian ideas. Therefore Puig i Elias resolved to come to an understanding with the Republicans, the Catalanists and the Socialists. Puig i Elias defended this analysis before other anarchists who wanted to, at least, attempt libertarian teaching. Because of this he quickly received the support of the Unión General de Trabajadores (UGT) and the Generalitat de Catalunya.

The first thing they did (during August, on full school holidays) was to analyse their needs and find out what was available. Some 157,000 school places were estimated to be covered. According to Ramón Navarro, during the first year, they were practically covered. But due to the war, many teachers had marched to the fronts, and as a result, and due to the increase in students, another 3,000 new teachers were needed. For the academic year of 1936-1937, 2,000 teachers were put to work, but even so the places were filled with people who did not have the corresponding degree.

Most of the teachers were unionised in the UGT, which caused most schools to end up under their influence. But the UGT was not only joined by Socialists and Communists, but also by Catalanists and Republicans. Practically all those who were not sympathisers of the CNT joined the UGT.

The New Unified School was conceived as the people's school for all the children of the country, and designed to provide free education for all levels, from kindergarten to university. It was created and supported by the State and the Generalitat, and directed, by the technical and administrative part, by a Superior Council made up of people who represented all levels of education. It was not defined as a school where students had to wear uniforms, but as an egalitarian school. It could admit different processes, schedules and special ways of doing and teaching, but it had to have a list of all the teaching and school activities within the same system that complied with some principles. It had to have a continuity and to respect the characteristics of each stage of development from child to young adult.

This transformation brought about changes in the legislation and in the educational system of Catalonia. The aim was a General Education Plan that contained very innovative aspects such as the approach of a common cycle of unified compulsory studies that begins from the nursery school, the relationship between primary and secondary education, a solid humanistic training in all university studies including technicians, the integration of the disabled, the care of those with learning disabilities and professional orientation aspects, the attempt to generalise the renewed teaching, etc.

Different visions of the political forces were integrated in the Council when realizing this project in practice, so the CENU happened to have a mission of informant and advisor of the Council of Culture.

=== General Education Plan ===
The Education Plan was based on the following three bases:

1. Teaching begins as soon as the child is born and continues until the total technical and spiritual formation of the human. By starting early and for all it facilitates equal education. There are no a priori differences that subsequently impair the child's education.
2. Coexistence with each other is obligatory, without distinction of origin or purpose: coexistence provides to a great extent the selection according to the personal relations of each one. Homogenisation, from the beginning, helps to avoid social impact.
3. Further selection will be based on individual factors: teaching must discover and develop the abilities of each, also taking into account personal desires.

=== New School Inspirations: The Rousseau Institute, Montessori, Freinet and Decroly ===
Many Catalan pedagogues had studied at the Jean-Jacques Rousseau Institute in Geneva, which had a considerable influence on the modernisation of the school system. This institute was not only inspired by the philosophical work of Jean-Jacques Rousseau, but also by the scientific psychology of Édouard Claparède, Pierre Bovet, Jean Piaget, Mina Audemars and Louise Lafendel. The Escola Nova was inspired by three then modern education methods: Montessori, Freinet and Decroly, which all wanted to replace traditional teaching, such as "one size fits all", authoritarian and ex cathedra education, with an active, interactive, social and more enjoyable approach that applied the principles of developmental psychology:

- Maria Montessori created the Montessori method, inspired by the principles of Friedrich Fröbel. The purpose was to help children develop their full potential, rather than learning to pass tests. Research shows that when the method is well implemented, children's outcomes, even in tests, are superior to those obtained with regular school methods. It was first introduced in Catalonia by Joan Palau i Vera.
- The Freinet method aims to build a more just and supportive society. Célestin Freinet started from egalitarian ideas and the principles of trust and mutual respect: being bigger than the student does not mean being above them. It is not learned by assimilating laws and rules recited from a podium, but by experience. Childhood in itself is a valuable stage in a person’s life. The child is not a potential adult. The school must propose functional activities, useful for life. It conceived the school as a democratic and cooperative community where they learn to live in democracy.
- The Decroly method takes the interests and needs of children as a starting point. Ovide Decroly proved that children are more motivated to be protagonists in their own learning. For him, teaching must respond to the needs of the human being and not just to mere knowledge. It distinguishes primary needs (eating, drinking, resting), secondary needs (self-love, approval, admiration), social, sexual, and maternal needs, increasingly adapted to the stage of development. Work is thematically based on real-life experiences and observations, to which the branches (language, mathematics, science, history and practical skills) are applied.

Inspired by these ideas, CENU had to train teachers and create the necessary spaces, adapted to each group: kindergartens, primary school, secondary school and higher education.

=== School buildings ===
The Municipal Commission of Culture of the City Council was in charge of constructing public schools. At that time, teaching was often given in any building, not very adapted to the pedagogical needs: stable, the ground floor of a hospital, or in high-rise rooms, with poor hygienic conditions and acoustics, and so overcrowded that only absolute silence and discipline could guarantee some order. In the Catalan Countries, there were 9047 buildings at the time, not always very suitable and 7882 new ones were missing to meet educational needs.

=== Immediate and end goals ===
In the short term, the Council had to combat illiteracy, which in 1930 was 12% of men and 24% of women in Barcelona, and 24% and 40% throughout Spain. In addition, the transition from primary to secondary school needed to be facilitated, especially for students with families in precariousness and also to improve training in pedagogy and teaching staff methodology for both teachers and university students who wanted to devote themselves to teaching. Secondary technical studies had to be reorganised to enable the transition to higher or university education.

In the longer term, it was planned to improve and expand the infrastructure, in order to reduce the number of students per class, have a primary school with a section for children by municipality as well as a secondary school for each municipality with more than five thousand inhabitants. The council aspired to provide free and compulsory education for all up to the age of eighteen. Continuing in higher education should be possible for everyone who had talent, and should no longer be conditioned by social background. It was planned to create a network of learning and working schools, called Technicum and to encourage active teachers to pursue university training in parallel.

=== Ideology and criticism ===
The CENU was a distinctly anti-fascist body. For this reason, ideological purges were carried out on several occasions, removing right-wing and Catholic teachers from their posts. These purges caused protests by Manuel de Irujo (Basque Nationalist Party), from the central government. The ideological control of the teaching staff was accentuated once the anarchists lost the leadership of the CENU. In June 1937, the requirements to be a teacher increased. All those who are suspected of not being sufficiently "politically related" were excluded.

However, Puig i Elias came from a libertarian background, understanding education as a tool to achieve a harmonious and peaceful society. At the time that the school functioned, during the Spanish Civil War, he stated that the school:

[...] does not want to make the child an element of combat against anything or anyone, against men or tendencies. The child is not a means, but a beginning and an end. It does not aspire to dominate it or to use it in the service of an idea, a party, a man or a regime. The child is like God, beginning and end. His soul must be fully respected so that it gives life the fullness of its content, without constraints, without deformations. [...] if each one of us is convinced of the goodness and superiority of their ideals, then we have no need to deform the soul of the child by molding it to our liking and according to our particular criteria. If we are confident that the integral development of each and every one of the child's faculties has to be achieved as a corollary to the integral development that is the goal, we cannot feel the need to give the child some ready-made ideas that are for them like a shell that prevents them from opening new horizons. Only people who are convinced of the falsehood of their ideals need to deform the natural soul of the child when it is still tender.

— Joan Puig i Elias

Despite the animosity that he received, the text spoke of the neutrality of education: "if Catholics wanted to make Catholics and socialists, socialists, anarchists do not want to make anarchists, what we propose is to make people". Anarchist education was permeated with this naturalistic stance on the natural goodness of children. This defense of the ideological neutrality of education was not shared by the UGT, which defended an indoctrinating education to establish a new revolutionary order. It was intended to impose republican ideals in order to discard any "fascist deviation" of the student.

But Puig Elias also had to justify himself to anarchist teachers. They came to see CENU as a "deviation" from anarchist principles, since it was at the disposal of the state. For the sector opposed to CENU, it was too close to socialist policies. This sector was formed, above all, by the Regional Federation of Rationalist Schools and the Libertarian Youth. Joan's brother, Josep, responded to these accusations by saying that the CENU put into practice with facts and not with vague statements the program that had been approved at the Zaragoza Congress of the CNT, in May 1936.

== Notable schools ==
=== Escola del Mar ===
On 7 March 1921, the president of the Culture Commission of the Barcelona City Council authorised the construction company Ribas i Pradell to build wooden pavilions for the future Escola del Mar, on Barceloneta beach. Ventura Gassol, minister of culture of Catalonia and member of the Culture Commission, asked Pere Vergés if he would like to become its director.

Vergès accepted the proposal. On 1 July, the building, not yet completely finished, hosted children's sessions of sea baths, and on 1 August, in addition to the bathing schedule, it was inaugurated as a beach semi-camp. A year later, the Commission of School Camps inaugurated, as an extension of the Escola del Mar, the first school camp in Calafell with the name of Vilamar. Pere Vergés followed the ideas of the New School and in this school importance was given to music, the school library and physical education based on respiratory gymnastics and swimming.

=== Escola del Bosc ===
The Escola del Bosc was built on the mountain of Montjuïc by the architect Antoni de Falguera who had studied similar buildings in Rome and Charlottenburg. Rosa Sensat wanted the school to be the place where one learns by living, with the aim of being able to synthesise the virtues of school and extracurricular education, articulating formal learning in the daily experiences of the environment.

== Differences with traditional schools ==
The methodology used in traditional schools and the ones of the model implemented by the CENU differed in the following aspects:

Traditional School	New School
Instructing the child with all the knowledge the teacher thought necessary for adulthood.	Stimulating the child's development, giving at each stage what the student demands as necessary to overcome their current selves and evolve.
Only considering the subjects that the teacher wants to teach the child, which in turn has to reach adulthood knowing everything. No consideration about the interests of each student.	Respecting the student's tastes and talents and guiding them on the path they want to follow.
Teaching guided only by the books, memorising of the syllabus in small doses, examining and grading the students the next day.	Observation-based methodology, using different methods than memorisation to transmit knowledge.
Behavioural methodology.	Constructivist methodology.
