= Francisco Ferrer =

19th and 20th-century Catalan anarchist and educationist

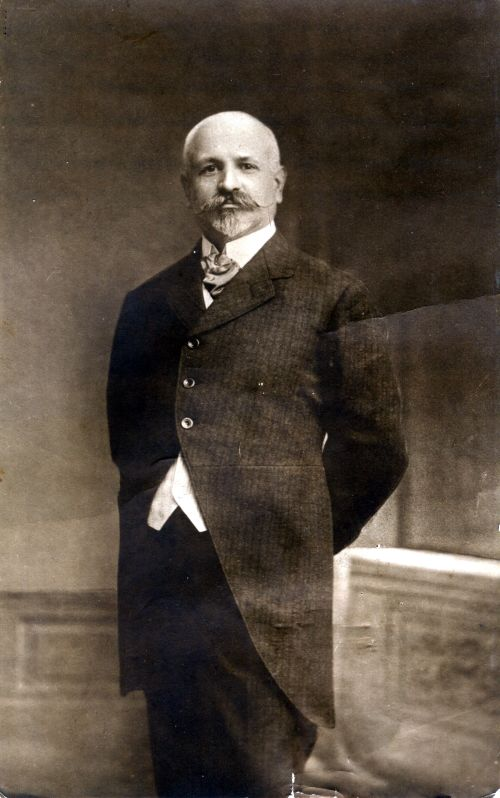
- Born: January 14, 1859; Alella, Barcelona, Spain
- Died: October 13, 1909 (aged 50); Barcelona, province of Barcelona, Spain
- Known for: Escola Moderna

Francesc Ferrer i Guàrdia (Catalan pronunciation: [fɾənˈsɛsk fəˈrej ˈɣwaɾði.ə]; January 14, 1859 – October 13, 1909), widely known as Francisco Ferrer (Spanish pronunciation: [fɾanˈθisko feˈreɾ]), was a Spanish radical freethinker, anarchist, and educationist behind a network of secular, private, libertarian schools in and around Barcelona. His execution, following a revolt in Barcelona, propelled Ferrer into martyrdom and grew an international movement of radicals and libertarians, who established schools in his model and promoted his schooling approach.

Ferrer was raised on a farm near Barcelona, where he developed republican and anti-clerical convictions. As a train conductor, he transmitted messages for the republican leader Manuel Ruiz Zorrilla, exiled in France. Following a failed republican uprising in 1885, Ferrer, too, moved to Paris with his family, where they stayed for 16 years. Ferrer began to explore anarchism and education. At the turn of the century, Ferrer had resolved to open a libertarian school modeled on Paul Robin's Prévost orphanage school. A large inheritance from a Parisian tutee provided the means to do so.

Upon returning to Barcelona in 1901, Ferrer founded the Barcelona Modern School, Escuela Moderna, which sought to provide a secular, libertarian curriculum as an alternative to the religious dogma and compulsory lessons common within Spanish schools. Ferrer's pedagogy borrowed from a tradition of 18th century rationalism and 19th century romanticism. He held that children should wield freewheeling liberties at the expense of conformity, regulation, and discipline. His school eschewed punishments, rewards, and exams, and encouraged practical experience over academic study. The school hosted lectures for adults, a school for teacher training, and a radical printing press, which printed textbooks and the school's journal. Around 120 offshoots of the school spread throughout Spain. The rapidity of Ferrer's rise troubled Spanish church and state authorities, who viewed the school as a front for insurrectionary activity. Ferrer was held in association with the 1906 assassination attempt on the Spanish King, which was used as a pretext for closing the school, but was ultimately released without conviction under international pressure a year later. Ferrer traveled Europe as an advocate of the Spanish revolutionary cause, founded a libertarian education advocacy organization, and reopened his press.

In mid-1909, Ferrer was arrested and accused of orchestrating a week of insurrection known as Barcelona's Tragic Week. Though Ferrer's involvement was likely not as blameless as intimated by his peers, he did not mastermind the events as charged. The ensuing court case, remembered as a show trial by a kangaroo court resulted in Ferrer's execution and triggered international outcry, as Ferrer was widely believed to be innocent at the time of his death. He was prominently memorialized in writing, monuments, and demonstrations across three continents. The protest became a movement to propagate his educational ideas, and Modern Schools in his name sprouted across the United States and Europe, reaching into Brazil and Asia.

== Early life and career ==
Francesc Ferrer i Guàrdia was born January 10 or 14, 1859, on a farm near Barcelona in Alella, Spain. He became a republican and freethinker in his youth. While his parents were pious Catholics, he grew independent and anti-clerical convictions from his freethinker uncle and militant atheist first employer.

During his mid-20s, Ferrer had become a radical Republican. In 1883, he was initiated into the Masonic Lodge Verdad in Barcelona (Lodge Number 146 of the Gran Oriente de España, under the leadership of Manuel Ruiz Zorrilla), taking on the symbolic name, Brother "Cero", he reached the 32°.

He used his position as a train conductor on a route between France and Barcelona to transmit messages for the exiled Republican leader Manuel Ruiz Zorrilla and shepherd republicans, radicals and freemasons to sanctuary. After supporting an attempted coup under General Manuel Villacampa del Castillo who intended to install a Spanish Republic in late 1886, Ferrer was himself forced to flee to France with his wife and three daughters, where they would stay for 16 years. While in France, Ferrer kept up his masonic activities with the Grand Orient de France.

== Exile in Paris ==
In Paris, Ferrer taught Spanish, sold wine on commission, volunteered as Ruíz's secretary (until his 1895 death), and pursued radical efforts. He was a Dreyfusard, a delegate to the London 1896 Congress of the Second International, and a teacher at the Masonic school.

Ferrer began to explore anarchism following Ruíz's death. He met Louise Michel, Elisée Reclus, Sébastien Faure, befriended Charles Malato and Jean Grave, and bonded with Spanish anarchists Anselmo Lorenzo and Fernando Tarrida del Mármol. Their personalities and ideas impressed him, and by the late 1890s, he considered them kindred spirits. While Ferrer would later deny involvement in the anarchist movement, especially when government scrutiny was strongest against him, historian of anarchism Paul Avrich wrote that Ferrer's anarchist affiliation was indisputable, despite his portrayal by former historians as a pacifist or idealist rather than revolutionary. Throughout his entire life and across multiple countries, Ferrer worked for anarchist causes, funded other anarchist work, and published anarchist books. Many major and minor anarchist figures from Barcelona worked in affiliation with the school Ferrer later opened, and Europe's most prominent anarchist leaders advised and wrote for him.

While in Paris, Ferrer became interested in education, which was a hot topic in anarchist and rationalist circles. Ferrer was captivated by Paul Robin's Prévost orphanage school in Cempuis, which modeled the school Ferrer would open. Robin's' co-educational "integral" program sought to develop the children's physical and intellectual capacities without coercion. He believed that social and economic environment played a larger role in a child's development than heredity, and so his school aimed to provide nature, exercise, love, and understanding, especially towards children normally subject to stigma. Ferrer corresponded with but never visited Robin in Cempuis. Around 1900, Ferrer declared his intention to open a similar libertarian school, which became plausible when he inherited around a million francs from a middle-aged French woman whom he had tutored in Spanish and convinced of his ideas.

== Barcelona Modern School ==
With a large inheritance from a Parisian tutee, Ferrer returned to Spain in 1901, where he would open the Barcelona Modern School, Escuela Moderna. Spain was in a time of self-reflection after losing the Spanish–American War, particularly regarding their national education. Liberals and radicals wanted more secular curriculum, with new scientific, historical, and sociological content and teachers not beholden to diocesan inspectors. Ferrer, a fervent atheist, became prominent in these conversations and advocated for a rational school as an alternative to the religious dogma and compulsory lessons common within Spanish schools. As a speaker, he was unpretentious and uncharismatic, but his sincerity and capacity for organization inspired others. Ferrer followed in a rough and ready Spanish tradition of extragovernment, rationalist education: the republicans and Fourierists schools (1840–50s), the anarchist and secularist schools (1870–80s), Paul Robin's Cempuis orphanage, Joan Puig i Elias (Catalonia), and José Sánchez Rosa (Andalusia).

Ferrer's libertarian pedagogy also borrowed from 18th century rationalism, 19th century romanticism, and pedagogues including Rousseau, Pestalozzi, Froebel, Kropotkin, and Tolstoy. This tradition pursued freewheeling liberties for children at the expense of conformity, regulation, and discipline. It combined play and crafts alongside academic work and championed traits of reason, dignity, self-reliance, and scientific observation over that of piety and obedience. It advocated for learning through experience rather than drilled instruction by rote, and for treating children with love and warmth. This model's adherents, in seeking a school that eschewed religious and political authority, thought that changes in mass education would circumvent the stunted public enlightenment and preservation of status quo that they blamed on the influence of both church and state. Free education, to Ferrer, entailed educators who would use improvised experimentation to arouse the child's will and autodidactic drive rather than impose their own dogmatic ideas through formal curriculum.

The Escuela Moderna opened on Barcelona's Carrer de les Corts with thirty students in September 1901. More than 126 students were enrolled five years later, in 1906, when the state shuttered the school. The Escuela Moderna charged sliding scale tuition based on parental capacity to pay, and divided students into three curricular levels. Ferrer's pedagogy sought to strip dogma from education and instead help children direct their own powers. Ferrer's school eschewed punishments and rewards, which he felt incentivized deception over sincerity. Similarly, he did not adopt grades or exams, whose propensity to flatter, deflate, and torture Ferrer considered injurious. Ferrer prioritized practical knowledge over theory and encouraged children to experience rather than read. Lessons entailed visits to local factories, museums, and parks where the objects of the lesson could be experienced firsthand. Pupils planned their own work and were trusted and free to attend as they pleased.

The Escuela Moderna additionally hosted a school to train teachers and a radical publishing press, which translated and created more than 40 textbooks adequate for Ferrer's purposes, written in accessible language on recent scientific concepts. The Spanish authorities abhorred the books, which covered topics from math and grammar to natural and social sciences to religious mythology and the iniquities of patriotism and conquest, for upending social order. The press's monthly journal hosted the school's news and articles from prominent libertarian writers.

Aside from the school's purpose of fostering self-development, Ferrer believed it had an additional function: prefigurative social regeneration. The school was an embryonic version of the future libertarian society Ferrer hoped to see. Propaganda and agitation were central to the Escuela Moderna's aims, as Ferrer dreamt of a society in which people constantly renewed themselves and their environment through experimentation. To this end, students received dogmatic instruction in the form of moral indoctrination. Ferrer believed that respect for fellow men was a quality to be instilled in children, as children brought to love freedom and see their dignity as shared with others would become good adults. The lessons of this education in social justice, equality, and liberty included capitalism as evil, government as slavery, war as crime against humanity, freedom as fundamental to human development, and suffering produced through patriotism, exploitation, and superstition. Their textbooks took positions against capitalism, the state, and the military. This education extended to adults, as well. The school invited parents to participate in the school's operation and the public to attend evening and Sunday afternoon lessons. Ferrer also advocated for a Spanish popular university that never came to fruition.

Ferrer was the center of Barcelonian libertarian education for the decade between his return and his death. The Escuela Moderna's program, from Ferrer's anticlericalism to the quality of guest intellectual lecturers, had impressed even middle-class liberal reformers. Anarchist Emma Goldman credited the success of the school's expansion to Ferrer's methodical administrative ability.

Other schools and centers in his model spread across Spain and to South America. By the time Ferrer opened a satellite school in the nearby textile center Vilanova i la Geltrú towards the end of 1905, Ferrer schools in the image of his Escuela Moderna, for both children and adults, grew across eastern Spain: 14 in Barcelona and 34 across Catalonia, Valencia, and Andalusia. The Spanish Republicans and the secular League of Freethinkers organized their own classes using materials from the school press, with around 120 such rationalist schools in all.

=== Politics ===
The rapidity of Ferrer's rise in influence troubled Spanish authorities. His monetary inheritance and organizing ability amplified his subversive efforts, and authorities viewed his school as a front for insurrectionary sentiment. Ferrer represented peril to many social institutions—the church, the state, the military, the family, gender segregation, property—and the conservatives who wished to preserve them.

During the school's early years, Ferrer adopted principles of anarcho-syndicalism, a philosophy of worker co-ownership that grew in prominence during this period. He published La Huelga General (The General Strike), a syndicalist journal, between 1901 and 1903, and worked to organize the Catalonian revolutionary labor movement and promote direct action. Ferrer led a parade of 1,700 children for secular education on Good Friday in April 1906.

Ferrer was intimidated and vilified for his work in Barcelona. Police raided his house and tailed his movements. He was subject to slanderous public rumors to tarnish his reputation, including intonations of gambling, financial speculation, and hedonism. Ferrer's various romantic relations with women were presented as indications of his school's moral lessons.

In 1905, Ferrer and the Modern School voiced their opposition to bullfighting, cautioning against using abolition of the practice as a means to stoke political nationalism.

He was held in association with the 1906 assassination attempt on Spanish King Alfonso XIII, but ultimately released under international pressure the next year. The assassin, Mateo Morral, was a 25-year-old anarchist, well-educated and from a wealthy family, who worked at the school's press. While the attempt itself—the second in two years—was unsuccessful, it was successful as the pretense for deposing Ferrer. He was arrested in June 1906 on charges of planning the attempt and persuading Morral to perform it. Within two weeks, state authorities closed the school due to its association with Morral and Ferrer. Conservative members of lower house of Spain's legislature unsuccessfully proposed that all secular schools be closed for their promotion of antisocial behaviors. For a year Ferrer awaited trial, where he was acquitted for lack of proof.

Ferrer's role in the Morral affair remains indeterminate, as of 1985. Ferrer was a militant anarchist, contrary to his proclamations otherwise, who believed in direct action and the usefulness of violence. The Spanish authorities attempted to connect Ferrer with two assassination attempts prior to Morral's. The Oxford historian Joaquín Romero Maura credits Ferrer with coordinating the Morral assassination attempt and a similar attempt a year earlier. Based on papers from French and Spanish authorities, Maura argues that Ferrer supplied the bombs and funds for the attempt to provoke insurrection. These types of official records from this period, however, were famous for their partiality and, even before some evidence from the case went missing, were altogether insufficient for conviction in Ferrer's time.

== After Escola Moderna ==
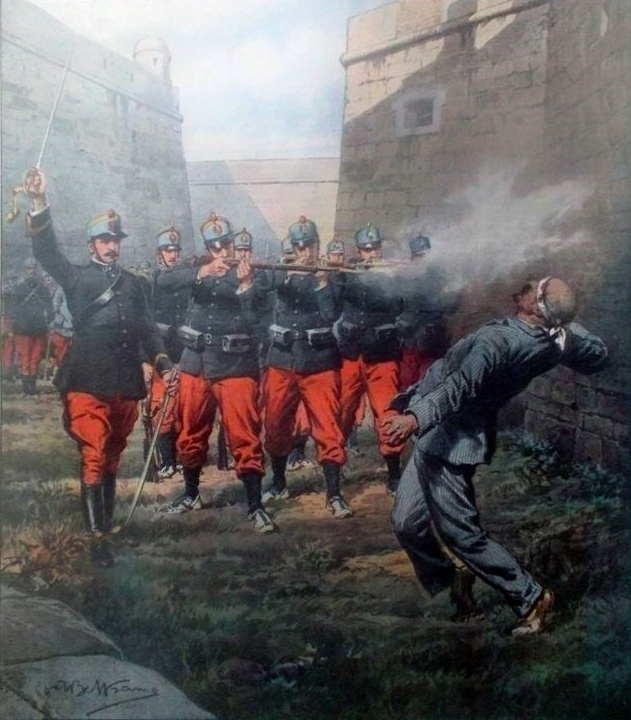
Newspaper illustration of Ferrer's death

Ferrer was released from prison in June 1907, backed by an international coalition of anarchist and rationalist organizations who presented Ferrer's case as another iniquitous Spanish inquisition. The next month, Ferrer toured the European capitals as an advocate of the Spanish revolutionary cause. When he returned to Barcelona in September, though Ferrer was prohibited from reopening his school, he reopened his press, where he published new textbooks and translations. He additionally helped the creation of the syndicalist labor federation Solidaridad Obrera and its journal.

In April 1908, Ferrer founded the International League for the Rational Education of Children, which would advocate for libertarian education across Europe. Its primary of three journals, L'Ecole Renovée, included articles by major anarchists and figures in libertarian education. Through its first year, the League led to libertarian schools in Amsterdam, Brussels, and Milan and worked with the libertarian schools of Sébastien Faure and Madeleine Vernet. But Ferrer would not see a second year with the League.

Ferrer was arrested at the end of August 1909 following the previous month's civil unrest and week of outright insurrection in Barcelona known as Tragic Week. Citizens, wary from a prior war and governmental corruption, originally demonstrated against a call for military reserves to fight a renewed colonial war in Morocco. The general strike called by Solidaridad Obrera culminated in a week of riots, which killed hundreds in and around Barcelona, and mass arrests, which led to torture, deportation, and execution. Ferrer was charged with orchestrating the rebellion and became its most famous casualty.

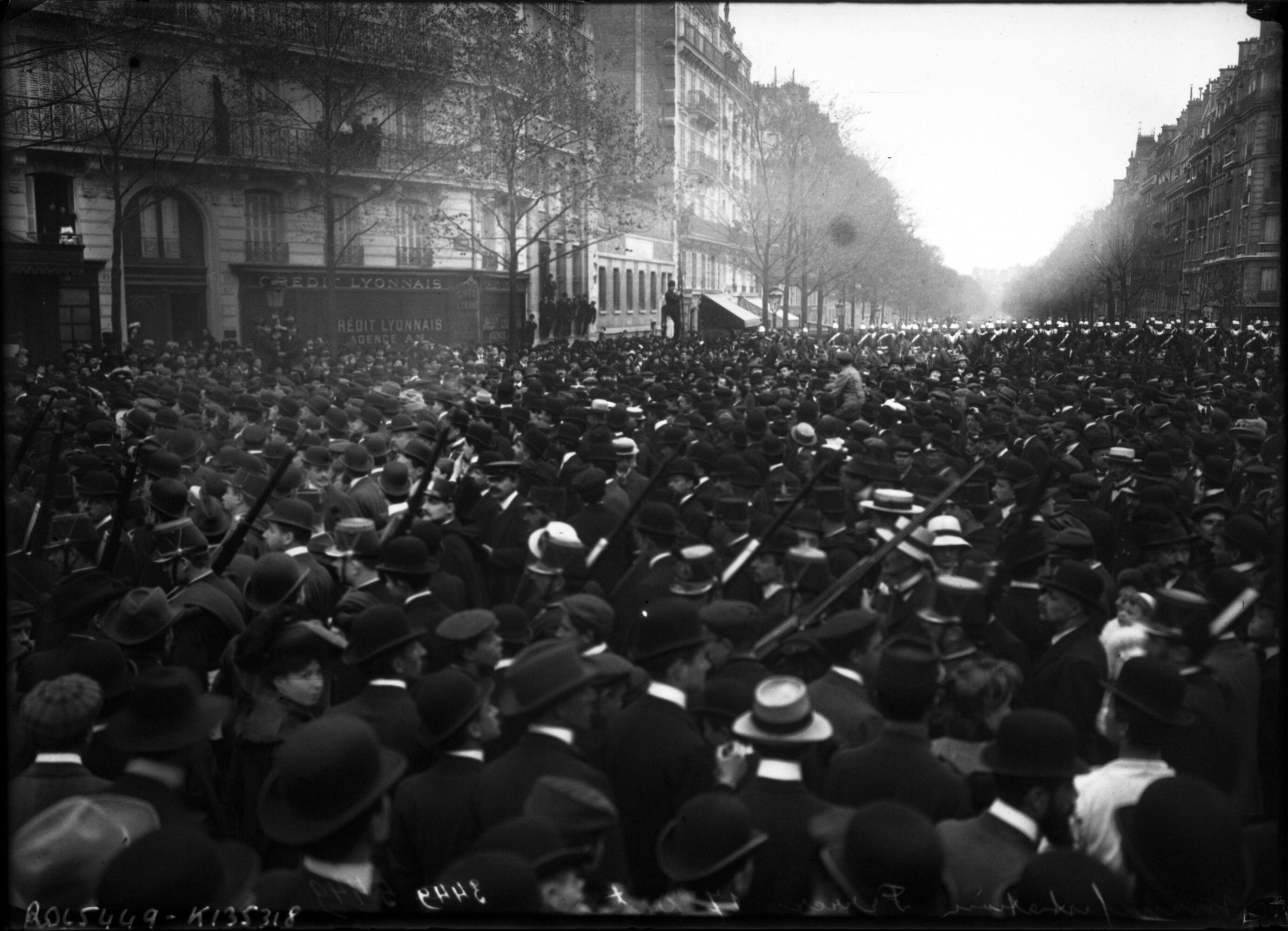
Protests in Paris following the execution of Ferrer

Although Ferrer participated in the events of the Catalan Tragic Week, he did not mastermind the events as charged. Reliable retellings of the insurrection credit spontaneous forces rather than anarchist premeditation. Ferrer likely participated in the week's events, though historian of anarchism Paul Avrich considered Ferrer's role marginal. The evidence presented at Ferrer's military court trial included testimony from his political enemies and Ferrer's prior subversive writings, but no evidence of his having orchestrated the rebellion. Ferrer maintained his innocence and was barred from presenting complementary testimony.

The court case, which would culminate in Ferrer's death by firing squad, is remembered as being quickly decided Historian Paul Avrich later summarized the case as "judicial murder", a successful attempt to quell an agitator whose ideas were dangerous to the status quo, as retribution for not convicting him in the Morral affair. His last words before the firing squad of Montjuïc Castle on October 13, 1909, were, "Aim well, my friends. You are not responsible. I am innocent. Long live the Modern School!"

== Legacy ==
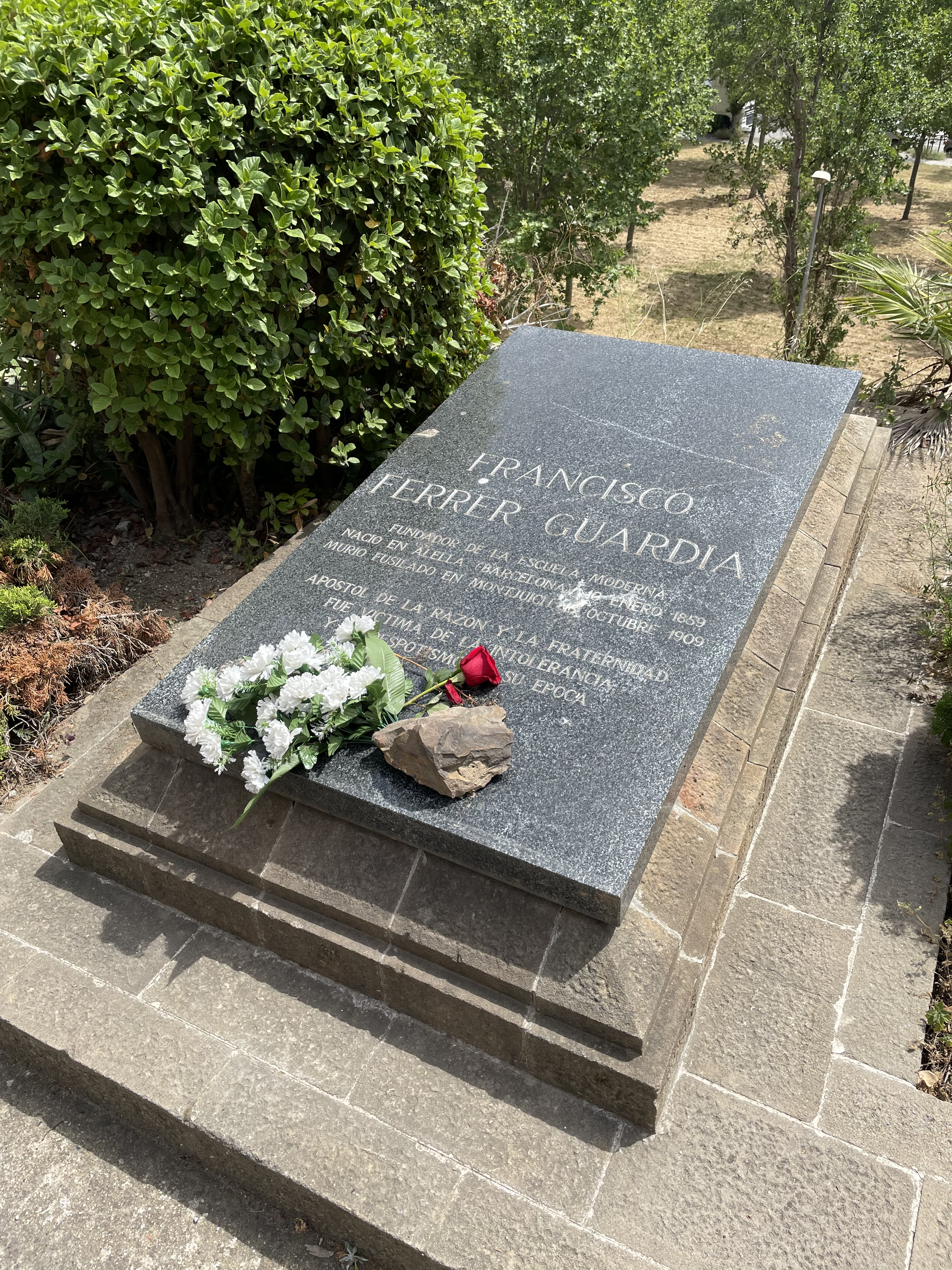
Gravestone of Francesc Ferrer at Montjuïc Cemetery

Ferrer's execution became known as "martyrdom" to the causes of free thought and rational education. Ferrer was widely believed to be innocent at the time of his death. His execution sparked worldwide protest and indignation. Beyond anarchism, liberals across society viewed Ferrer as a martyr to the collusion of a vengeful church and traditionalist state. Protests in many of Europe's major cities coincided with hundreds of meetings across America, Europe, and Asia. A 15,000-person throng descended on Paris's Spanish embassy, and the anarchist black flag draped from the Milan Cathedral. British luminaries spoke in outrage, including George Bernard Shaw, H. G. Wells, and Arthur Conan Doyle alongside anarchists Kropotkin, Errico Malatesta, and Tarrida. Ferrer's death was covered widely, from the front page of The New York Times to a number of books.

The worldwide protest became the Ferrer educational movement in his honor. The fact of his execution accelerated Ferrer's renown as the most famous libertarian educator, over Sébastian Faure and Paul Robin. His works were translated into multiple languages as a rationalist education movement spread worldwide. Modern Schools sprouted across Europe and the United States, including the long-lived colony at Stelton, New Jersey, but most did not last past the mid-1920s. Schools by his name reached as far as Argentina, Brazil, China, Japan, Mexico, Poland, and Yugoslavia. His methods were invoked by Gustav Landauer (Bavarian Revolution of 1919) and Nestor Makhno (Russian Revolution of 1917).

Groups erected and named public memorials to Ferrer across Europe. Brussels displayed a marble commemoration for Ferrer in its Grand-Place in mid-1910 and, separately, erected Ferrer's first honorary statue of a nude man holding the torch of enlightenment, in 1911. It was destroyed in 1915 under German occupation and restored by the international freethought movement in 1926. Public places in France and Italy adopted Ferrer's name in memorial.

The international fallout from Ferrer's execution led to the demise of the Antonio Maura administration.

== Personal life ==
Ferrer separated from his wife, Teresa Sanmartí, and later had relations with a friend of the woman whose inheritance funded the Barcelona school. He then fell in love with a teacher at his Escuela Moderna, Soledad Villafranca.

== See also ==
- Anarchism in Spain
- Lorenzo Portet

== Bibliography ==
- Avrich, Paul (1980). "The Martyrdom of Ferrer". The Modern School Movement: Anarchism and Education in the United States. Princeton: Princeton University Press. pp. 3–33. ISBN 978-0-691-04669-3. OCLC 489692159. Archived from the original on December 24, 2019.
- Fidler, Geoffrey C. (1985). "The Escuela Moderna Movement of Francisco Ferrer: 'Por la Verdad y la Justicia'". History of Education Quarterly. 25 (1/2): 103–132. doi:10.2307/368893. ISSN 0018-2680. JSTOR 368893. S2CID 147119437.
- Veysey, Laurence (1973). "The Ferrer Colony and Modern School". The Communal Experience: Anarchist and Mystical Counter-Cultures in America. New York: Harper & Row. pp. 77–177. ISBN 978-0-06-014501-9. Archived from the original on December 24, 2019.
- Avilés Farré, Juan (2006). Francisco Ferrer y Guardia: pedagogo, anarquista y mártir. Marcial Pons Ediciones de Historia. ISBN 9788496467194.
- Martínez Olmedilla, Augusto (1960). Cien años y un día. London: Aguilar.
- Holguin, Sandie Eleanor (2002). Creating Spaniards: Culture and National Identity in Republican Spain. University of Wisconsin Press. p. 29. ISBN 9780299176303.. Retrieved May 5, 2018.
- Cooke, Bill (2010). A Rebel to His Last Breath: Joseph Mccabe and Rationalism. Prometheus Books. p. 217. ISBN 978-1-61592-749-4.
- Hughes, Robert (2011). Barcelona. Knopf Doubleday. p. 523. ISBN 9780307764614.
- Tusell, Javier (2002) [2001]. García Queipo de Llano. Genoveva. pp. 185–186. ISBN 9788430604494.
