= Soledad Villafranca =

Spanish pedagogue and anarchist (1880–1948)

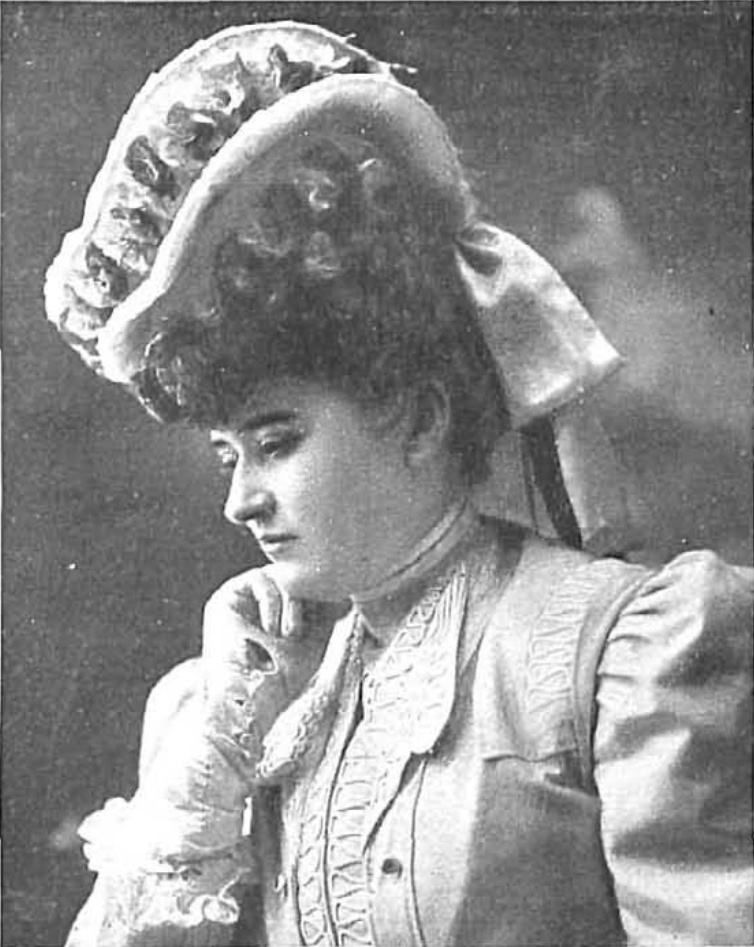
- Villafranca in 1907
- Born: 1880; Agoitz, Navarre, Spain
- Died: 1948 (aged 67–68); Barcelona, Spain
- Known for: Ferrer movement

Soledad Juliana Villafranca Los Arcos (1880–1948) was a Spanish anarchist known for teaching at the Escuela Moderna and as a companion of Francisco Ferrer.

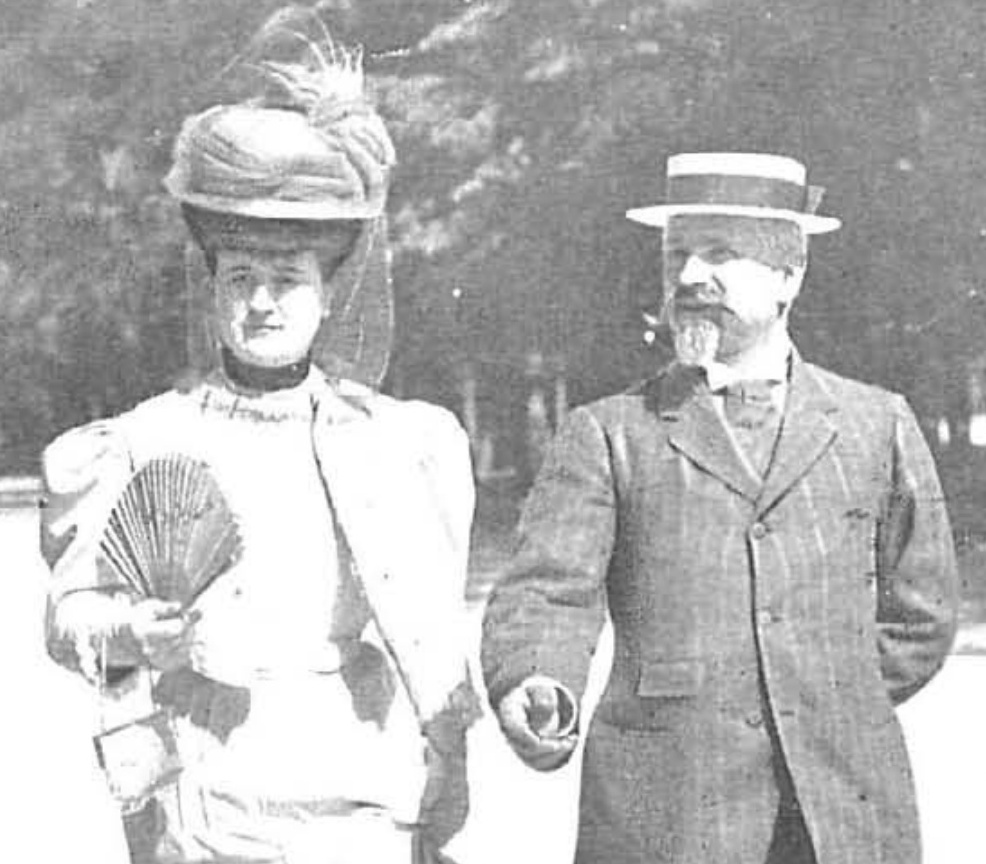
Villafranca and Ferrer, 1909

== Life ==
Soledad Juliana Villafranca Los Arcos was born in the Spanish Navarre town of Agoitz in 1878 or 1880 or 1876. She was the fifth of nine children to José Maria and Josefa, a wealthy, progressive, freethinking family from small towns in Navarre. Her father ran the prison in Agoitz and fought in the Navarre Guard during the Third Carlist War. When he died in 1885, Villafranca's mother moved the family to the agrarian city Pamplona but when there was not enough to make ends meet, the family split to try other cities. Villafranca moved in 1902 to Barcelona, where two of her sisters socialized and married in the city's radical and anarchist community.

In Barcelona, Villafranca and her sisters met Francisco Ferrer, who had founded the secular, rationalist Escuela Moderna school. Villafranca became romantically involved with Ferrer and taught in the school's elementary program.

The school's librarian, Mateu Morral, might have attempted to kill the king in 1906 as an expression of his frustrated love for her. He had sent her a letter prior to the bombing attentat that raised suspicion of Villafranca as a potential co-conspirator alongside Ferrer. She testified that she had no role in the attack.

Freed from implication in the event, Villafranca accompanied Ferrer during his 1907–1909 exile, where they spread anarchist propaganda across Europe. They visited multiple European cities including Antwerp and Paris, telling the story of their persecution and meeting the defense organizations created in their name. Returning to Spain, they continued their tour through Andalusia in 1909.

In July, Barcelona erupted in civil disorder known as Tragic Week, and a court charged him with orchestrating it. Villafranca and her family testified at his trial, which resulted in him being sentenced to death. The Maura administration exiled Villafranca to Aragon, first in Alcañiz, then to Teruel. She continued to push for Ferrer's release, including protests and a request for a royal pardon. After Ferrer's execution, she worked to keep his tradition alive.

She was linked in the 1912 assassination of Prime Minister José Canalejas through its perpetrator, Manuel Pardiñas, an associate of Villafranca. She was accused of inciting the assassination without evidence, marred from her history of prior suspicions.

Villafranca withdrew from activism after marrying in 1914. Her husband, Carlos Woessner, was a charcoal businessman from Germany who had considerable prestige in Barcelona. Villafranca moved to Cologne during the Spanish Civil War and returned to Barcelona in 1939 after the war ended. She died there in 1948 or 1949.

== Bibliography ==
- Bray, Mark (2022). The Anarchist Inquisition: Assassins, Activists, and Martyrs in Spain and France. Ithaca: Cornell University Press. ISBN 978-1-5017-6192-8.
- Díez de Ure, Ana; Roda Hernández, Paco (2000). "Villafranca Los Arcos, Soledad Juliana". In Martínez, Cándida; Pastor, Reyna; José de la Pascua, María; Tavera, Susanna (eds.). Mujeres en la historia de España: enciclopedia biográfica. Enciclopedias Planeta (in Spanish). Barcelona: Planeta. pp. 709–711. ISBN 84-08-03541-X.
