= Lorenzo Portet =

Spanish anarchist (1870–1917)

- Born: 1870; Catalonia, Spain
- Died: 10 May 1917 (aged 46–47); Paris, France
- Movement: Anarchism

Lorenzo Portet (1870–1917) was a Spanish anarchist and an associate of anarchist and educational reformer Francesc Ferrer i Guàrdia).

== Biography ==
Born in Catalonia in 1870, Portet was raised in Barcelona, Spain. He attended the University of Barcelona, then went to Buenos Aires, Argentina to teach. In 1895, after five years away, Portet returned to Spain and soon got involved in an insurrection. He fled to Paris where in 1896 he met Francesc Ferrer i Guàrdia, founder of the Escuela Moderna or Modern School movement. He returned to Barcelona to get information and report on the people being tortured in Montjuic after the 1896 Corpus Christi procession bombing in Barcelona. He then returned to Paris where he ran the publishing house Ferrer had established. After Ferrer was executed in 1909 following the events known as the Tragic Week, Portet led a mass demonstration in Paris in front of the Spanish embassy. Though Ferrer left him his house in Paris, his publishing house and stock in Barcelona, and shares in two companies to enable Portet to carry on Ferrer's work, Portet was arrested and expelled from France. Portet fled to Liverpool, England where he taught foreign languages.

Portet met American radical and fellow exile, Margaret Sanger, in a Liverpool café. Sanger met with several Spanish anarchists, including Lorenzo Portet, with whom she had a passionate affair.

== See also ==
- Margaret Sanger
- Modern School (United States)
- Escuela Moderna
- Francesc Ferrer i Guàrdia
