= Paul Robin =

French anarchist pedagogue

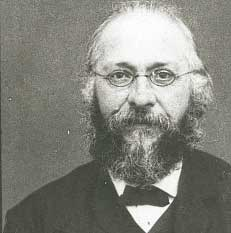
Paul Robin

Paul Robin (3 April 1837 in Toulon, France - 31 August 1912 in Paris) was a French anarchist pedagogue, known in particular for having developed integral education at the orphanage in Cempuis. He was the most significant figure of the French Neo-Malthusianism movement.

== Biography ==
Paul Robin was born in Toulon into a bourgeois, Catholic and patriotic family.

A pupil of the École normale supérieure in Paris, he passed his bachelor's degrees in mathematics and physical sciences; he becomes a Darwinist and an atheist. He was briefly a high school teacher (1861 - 1865), but came into conflict with his administration on matters of popular education, for which he had a keen interest. In 1865, he left for Belgium where he established contacts with activists of the International Workers' Association, helped create the Belgian section of it and was expelled for having participated in the movement supporting a strike. He retired to Switzerland, then to France (where he was imprisoned in July 1870), and finally to England. In London, where he frequented the militants of the International; he was a member of the General Council of the International for a time, but quickly broke with the “authoritarian” Marx to take the side of Mikhail Bakunin, whose anarchist ideas he shared. During his voluntary exile, he gave lessons.

In 1879, he returned to France as an inspector of primary education appointed by Ferdinand Buisson, director of primary education to Minister Jules Ferry. Robin had previously collaborated on the Ferdinand Buisson Dictionary of Pedagogy. Thanks to Buisson, who gave him constant support, Robin was placed at the head, from 1880 to 1894, of the Prévost Orphanage, in Cempuis (Oise). In this establishment which depends on the general council of the Seine, he put into practice, on a significant number of children, the theories on integral education which he formulated from 1869 to 1870. This education, which is intended to give children from disadvantaged classes the means to access education, is characterized, in addition to its atheism and internationalism, by the concern to harmoniously develop the individual as a whole. Robin's teaching was based upon observation, development of the artistic direction of the child and taking into account the children's desires. Co-education was the rule, and the children were taken along for two months to the sea each summer, etc. Physical, manual and intellectual education were complemented with 19 different workshops which provided them at least one complete formation of a trade occupation (a bakery, printing works, photography, masonry, etc.). These workshops also provided the school a certain financial autonomy. Robin's educational methods, too revolutionary for their time, resulted in his expulsion from Cempuis on 31 August 1894, following a very virulent press campaign waged against him by the Free Word. Octave Mirbeau then took up his defense and denounced the liberticide collusion between Cartouche (the corrupt republican politicians) and Loyola (the retrograde Catholic Church).

In 1896, Robin founded the League for Human Regeneration. At its head, he introduced into France the neo-Malthusian principles he had discovered in England and tirelessly campaigned to disseminate the means of birth control among the working class. He saw “parental caution” as a means of emancipation for the poorest and particularly women. He also developed certain eugenic aspects - a theory which was widespread at the time in medical circles. He published numerous neo-Malthusian propaganda brochures. He worked for a time with Eugene Humbert, with whom he eventually had a falling-out.

Feeling his strength and his faculties decline, Paul Robin took his own life in 1912. Positivist to the end, he studied the progress of the effect of the poison on himself.

But Robin's legacy at Cempuis was not lost, and he had a tremendous influence on two other great anarchist pedagogues: Francisco Ferrer and Sébastien Faure.

== Bibliography ==
- Christiane Demeulenaere-Douyère
  - Paul Robin. Un militant de la liberté et du bonheur, Paris, Publisud, 1994.
  - Paul Robin et l’éducation intégrale : principes et expérimentation, exposé présenté aux Rencontres de Bieuzy, 1999, en hommage à Francisco Ferrer.
  - Un précurseur de la mixité : Paul Robin et la coéducation des sexes, in Coéducation et mixité, CLIO, Histoire, Femmes et Sociétés, 2003, 18, p. 125-132 full text.
  - Buisson et l’Orphelinat Prévost de Cempuis, in Fondateur de la laïcité, militant de la paix, Actes du colloque commémorant le 70e anniversaire de la disparition de Ferdinand Buisson, Grandvilliers, Oise (September 2002), Amiens, CRDP, 2004, p.89-96.
  - Cempuis ou l’éducation libertaire aux champs (1880-1894), A. Baubérot et Fl. Bourillon (dir.), Urbaphobie. La détestation de la ville aux XIXe et XXe siècles, Conseil général du Val-de-Marne-CRHEC-Éditions Bière, 2009, p.183-194 full text.
  - Cempuis. Un idéal d’éducation libertaire, Barricade, n° 4, (February 2012), p. 32-34.
- Nathalie Brémand
  - Paul Robin et son expérience à l’orphelinat de Cempuis (1880-1894), in L’affaire Ferrer : les expériences libertaires en France en matière d'éducation au début du siècle, Actes du colloque organisé à Castres le (14 October 1989), sous la direction de Madeleine Rebérioux, Centre national et musée Jean Jaurès, Castres, 1991, p. 49-62.
  - Cempuis : une expérience d'éducation libertaire à l'époque de Jules Ferry, 1880-1894, Paris, Éditions du Monde libertaire, 1992, online extracts.
- Federico Ferretti, “The spatiality of geography teaching and cultures of alternative education: the ‘intuitive geographies’ of the anarchist school in Cempuis (1880-1894)”, Cultural Geographies, 2016, online.
- B. Lechevalier, Paul Robin, in Quinze pédagogues, Paris, Armand Colin, 1997.
- M. Dommanget, Paul Robin, in Les grands socialistes et l'éducation, Armand Colin (Coll. U).
- Jeanne Humbert, Une grande figure, Paul Robin, 1837-1912, La Ruche ouvrière, 1967.
- G. Giroud, Paul Robin, sa vie, ses idées, son action, Paris, 1937.
- Paul Robin, Manifiesto a los partidarios de la educacion integral: (un antecedente de la escuela moderna), J.J. de Olaneta, 1981.
- Léo Campion, Le Drapeau noir, l'Équerre et le Compas : les Maillons libertaires de la Chaîne d'Union, Éditions Alternative libertaire, 1996, read online, pdf.
- Aristide Delannoy, Victor Méric, Paul Robin, Les Hommes du jour, n°102, (January 1, 1910), texte intégral.
- Martine BRUNET-GIRY, Ferdinand Buisson et les socialistes libertaires, Nouvelle Imprimerie Laballery, Clamecy, 2014, 285 p.
