= Ferrer movement =

Social movement

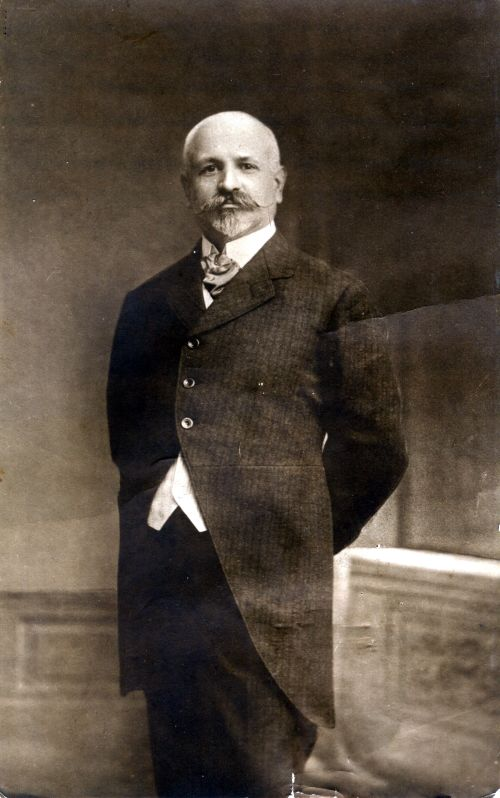
Francisco Ferrer Guardia

The Ferrer school was an early 20th century libertarian school inspired by the anarchist pedagogy of Francisco Ferrer. He was a proponent of rationalist, secular education that emphasized reason, dignity, self-reliance, and scientific observation, as opposed to the ecclesiastical and dogmatic standard Spanish curriculum of the period. Ferrer's teachings followed in a tradition of rationalist and romantic education philosophy, and 19th century extragovernment, secular Spanish schools. He was particularly influenced by Paul Robin's orphanage at Cempuis.

With this ideal in mind, Ferrer established the Escola Moderna in Barcelona, which ran for five years between 1901 and 1906. Ferrer tried a less dogmatic approach to education that would try to draw out the child's natural powers, though children still received moral indoctrination on social responsibility and the importance of freedom. Ferrer championed practical knowledge over theory, and emphasized experiences and trips over readings. Pupils were free and trusted to direct their own education and attend as they pleased. The school also hosted lectures for adults in the evenings and weekends. It also hosted a printing press to create readings for the school. The press ran its own journal with news from the school and articles from prominent libertarian writers.

Following Ferrer's execution, an international Ferrer movement (also known as the Modern School movement) spread throughout Europe and as far as Brazil and the United States, most notably in the New York and Stelton Modern School.

== Background ==
Francisco Ferrer, through his Escuela Moderna, sought to afford children educational liberties uncommon for the time period. Upon his return to Barcelona in 1901, following 16 years of exile in Paris, Ferrer became a prominent proponent of education focused on reason, dignity, self-reliance, and scientific observation. Standard Spanish schools, by comparison, emphasized piety and obedience under the authority of the Church. Where those schools used formal regulation and dogmatic curriculum to discipline and conform, Ferrer wanted his school to encourage originality, independence, the combination of manual and intellectual work, openness between children and teachers, and participation of children and parents in school administration.

Ferrer's pedagogy descended from a libertarian pedagogical tradition from 18th century rationalism and 19th century romanticism, with pedagogues including Rousseau, Pestalozzi, Froebel, Kropotkin, and Tolstoy. These influences advocated learning through experience and treating children with love and warmth. By removing the influence of the church and state from mass education, they argued, the enlightened public would upend the status quo. A free education, to Ferrer, entailed educators who would use improvised experimentation and spontaneity—rather than their own formal dogma—to arouse the child's will and autodidactic drive. His beliefs on pedagogy did not follow a single school of thought, being of a time when ideological separations were not as pronounced. Instead, they reflected a rough and ready Spanish tradition of extragovernment, rationalist education: the republicans and Fourierists schools (1840–50s), the anarchist and secularist schools (1870–80s), Paul Robin's Cempuis orphanage in France, Joan Puig i Elias's work in Catalonia, and José Sánchez Rosa's work in Andalusia.

Education was a major topic among rationalists and anarchists at the close of the 19th century. Ferrer had been a longtime radical for Spanish republicanism but moved towards anarchist circles during his time in Paris, where he read ravenously about education. He was captivated by Paul Robin's Prévost orphanage school in Cempuis, which tried to integrate the children's physical and intellectual capacities without coercion. Around 1900 Ferrer announced he would open a libertarian school based on that model. This intention became plausible when he inherited around a million francs from a French woman whom he had tutored and convinced of his ideas. His return to Spain in 1901 coincided with a period of national self-reflection, particularly regarding ecclesiastical national education, after losing the Spanish–American War.

== Barcelona ==
The Escola Moderna opened on Barcelona's Carrer de les Corts with 30 students on September 8, 1901. This class was nearly two-thirds male and divided into three groups: primary, intermediate, and advanced. The school charged sliding scale tuition based on parental capacity to pay. School enrollment increased throughout its existence, from 70 at the end of the first year to 114 in 1904 and 126 in 1905. Spanish authorities closed the school in 1906.

Ferrer's pedagogy sought to strip dogma from education and instead help children direct their own powers. Ferrer's school eschewed punishments and rewards, which he felt incentivized deception over sincerity. Similarly, he did not adopt grades or exams, because he considered that their propensity to flatter, deflate, and torture were injurious. Ferrer prioritized practical knowledge over theory, and encouraged children to experience rather than read. Lessons entailed visits to local factories, museums, and parks where the objects of the lesson could be experienced firsthand. Pupils planned their own work and were trusted and free to attend as they pleased.

The school invited parents to participate in the school's operation and the public to attend lessons. Evening and Sunday afternoon lectures were open to the public and featured scholars of physiology, geography, and natural science. By the school's second year, these ad hoc lectures had become regular evening courses. Ferrer spoke with Barcelona University professors about creating a popular university with classes open to the public. Though this idea grew contemporaneously in France and other parts of Europe, Ferrer's popular university did not come to fruition.

Apart from the school's workshop, laboratory, and teaching aids including maps, the Escola Moderna hosted a school to train teachers and a radical publishing press. The press was partly impelled by what Ferrer considered a lack of decent reading material. With a cadre of translators and luminaries, the press created more than 40 textbooks written in accessible language on recent scientific concepts, many translated from French. The Spanish authorities abhorred the books for upending social order. Their topics included grammar, math, natural and social science, geography, anthropology, sociology, religious mythology, and the injustices of patriotism and conquest. The most popular children's book was Jean Grave's utopian fairy tale The Adventures of Nono. Other titles included:

- Survey of Spanish History by Nicolás Estévanez
- Compendium of Universal History by Clémence Jacquinet
- Physical Geography by Odón de Buen
- First Stages of Humanity by Georges Engerrand
- The Origins of Christianity by Malvert
- Ethnic Psychology by Charles Letourneau
- Man and the Earth (abridged edition) by Elisée Reclus
- Poverty: Its Cause and Cure by Léon Martin
- Social Classes by Charles Malato

The press's monthly journal, Boletín de la Escuela Moderna, hosted the school's news and articles from prominent libertarian writers. The press published selections from student essays, which were written on themes of economic and religious oppression.

Atop the school's purpose of fostering self-development, Ferrer believed it had an additional function: prefigurative social regeneration. The school was an embryonic version of the future libertarian society Ferrer hoped to see. Propaganda and agitation were central to the Escola Moderna's aims, as Ferrer dreamt of a society in which people constantly renewed themselves and their environment through experimentation. Ferrer approximated the role of the syndicalist union for the school.

To this end, the Escola Moderna students were not free from dogmatic instruction, which they received in the form of moral indoctrination. Ferrer believed that respect for fellow men was a quality to be instilled in children. Children brought to love freedom and see their dignity as shared with others, by this accord, would become good adults. The school also taught the international Esperanto language to foster cooperation. The lessons of this education in social justice, equality, and liberty included capitalism as evil, government as slavery, war as crime against humanity, freedom as fundamental to human development, and suffering produced through patriotism, exploitation, and superstition. Their textbooks took positions against capitalism, the state, and the military:

- Anarchist Morality by Peter Kropotkin
- War by Charles Malato
- A Free World by Jean Grave
- The Feast of Life by Anselmo Lorenzo

Ferrer was the center of Barceloinan libertarian education for the decade between his return and his death. The Escola Moderna's program, from Ferrer's anticlericalism to the quality of guest intellectual lecturers, had impressed even middle-class liberal reformers. Anarchist Emma Goldman credited the success of the school's expansion to Ferrer's methodical administrative ability.

Other schools and centers in his model spread across Spain and to South America. By the time Ferrer opened a satellite school in the nearby textile center Vilanova i la Geltrú towards the end of 1905, Ferrer schools in the image of his Escola Moderna, for both children and adults, grew across eastern Spain: 14 in Barcelona and 34 across Catalonia, Valencia, and Andalusia. The Spanish Republicans and the secular League of Freethinkers organized their own classes using materials from the school press, with around 120 such rationalist schools in all.

== International movement ==
Ferrer schools spread as far as Geneva, Liverpool, Milan, São Paulo, and New York. Their variety complicates their comprehensive study.

The resulting Ferrer movement's philosophy of pedagogy had two distinct tendencies: towards non-didactic freedom from dogma, and the more didactic fostering of counter-hegemonic beliefs. Towards non-didactic freedom from dogma, Ferrer fulfilled the child-centered tradition of Rousseau, Pestalozzi, and Froebel by "opting out" of the traditional systems of Spanish education. Ferrer's pedagogy advanced an "ideal" of education against a critique of the "evils" of schooling systems. Towards the didactic fostering of counter-hegemonic beliefs, the Ferrer schools of Barcelona, Lausanne, Liverpool, and Clivio (northern Italy) advocated for the school's role in driving sociopolitical change. They sought to change society by changing the school, that rational education would address error and ignorance.

=== United States ===
Following Ferrer's execution, Emma Goldman, Alexander Berkman, and other anarchists founded the Ferrer Association in New York City to promote Ferrer's teachings and open schools in his model across the United States. The Association's Modern School, operated from its New York City Ferrer Center from 1911 in its first incarnation, served as a model for similarly short-lived schools in Chicago, Los Angeles, Salt Lake City, and Seattle. Each lasted several years. However, the schools opened at the Stelton (New Jersey) and Mohegan (New York) colonies lasted decades.

The schools mostly did not employ formal curriculum and their lessons were non-compulsory. Students focused on hands-on work. These schools fell out of favor during the 1940s, though a few continued into the next decade. American libertarian schools experienced a resurgence in the 1960s and were guided by alumni of Ferrer schools.

== Sources ==
- Avrich, Paul (1980). "The Martyrdom of Ferrer". The Modern School Movement: Anarchism and Education in the United States. Princeton: Princeton University Press. p. 3–33. ISBN 978-0-691-04669-3. OCLC 489692159.
- Fidler, Geoffrey C. (1985). "The Escuela Moderna Movement of Francisco Ferrer: 'Por la Verdad y la Justicia'". History of Education Quarterly. 25 (1/2): 103–132. doi:10.2307/368893. ISSN 0018-2680. JSTOR 368893.
- Gay, Kathlyn; Gay, Martin (1999). "Modern School Movement". Encyclopedia of Political Anarchy. ABC-CLIO. pp. 145–146. ISBN 978-0-87436-982-3.
- Steele, Tom (Autumn 2010). "Enlightened Publics: Popular Education Movements in Europe, Their Legacy and Promise". Studies in the Education of Adults. 42 (2): 107–123. doi:10.1080/02660830.2010.11661592. ISSN 0266-0830.
