= People's University of Niamey =

- Université populaire de Niamey
- Motto: "Sharing Knowledge"
- Type: People's University
- Founders: Prof. Seyni Moumouni (project initiator)
- Location: Niamey, Niger; 13.137°N 2.340°E
- Language: French
- Website: Official website

The People's University of Niamey is a popular education institution located in Niamey, the capital of Niger.

== Overview ==
Free and open to all, this people's university aims to transmit knowledge to as many people as possible.

The People's University of Niamey offers courses in various fields:

- Languages
- Arts, Letters, and Humanities
- Law, Cultures, and Societies
- Philosophy
- Economy and Sustainable Development
- Sciences
- Theater, Cinema, Music
- Sports
