= Ferdinand Buisson =

French educational bureaucrat, pacifist and politician

Ferdinand Édouard Buisson
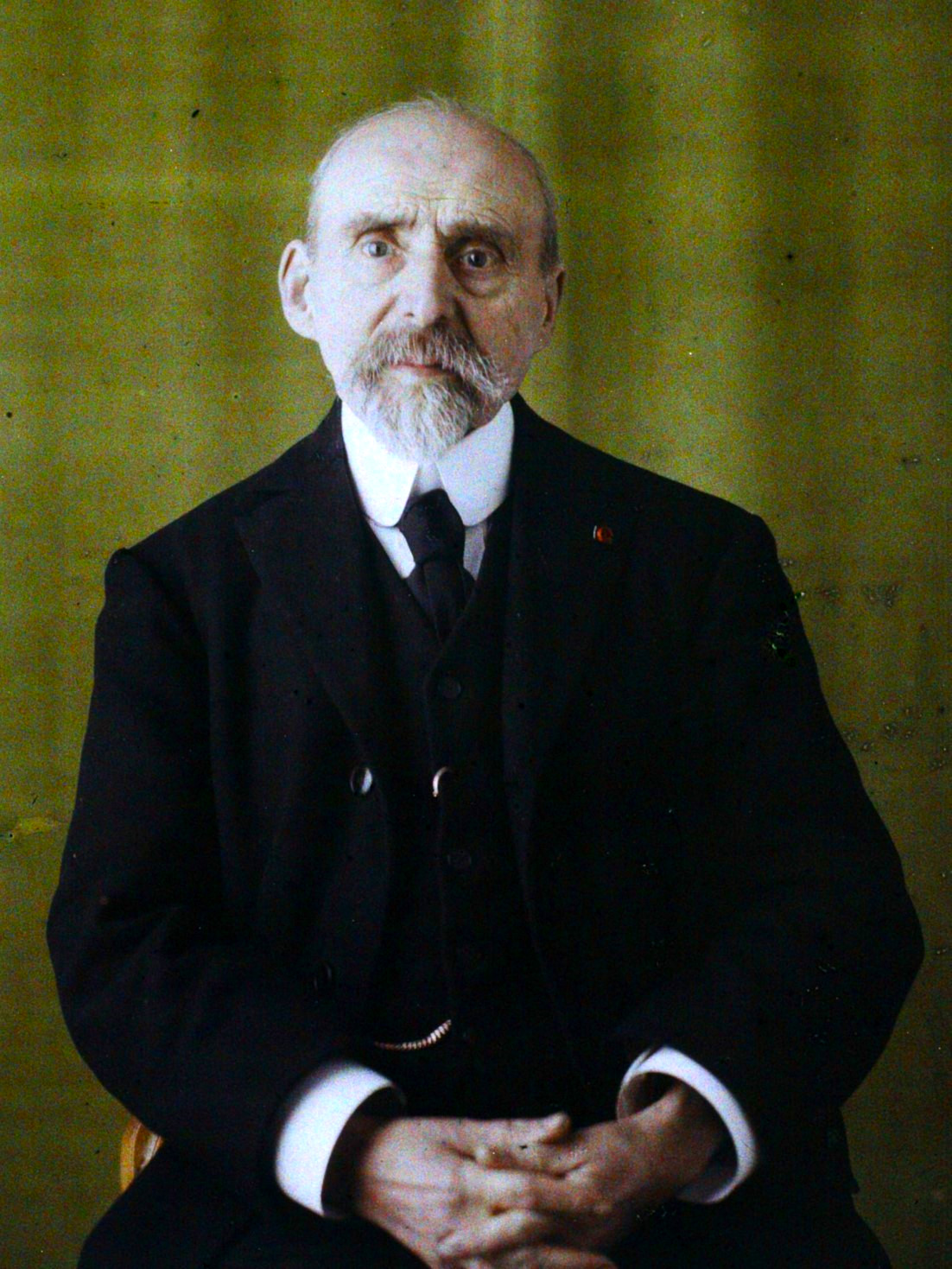
- 1930 Autochrome
- Born: 20 December 1841; Paris, France
- Died: 16 February 1932 (aged 90); Thieuloy-Saint-Antoine, France
- Occupation: politician
- Known for: Nobel Peace Prize in 1927

Ferdinand Édouard Buisson (French pronunciation: [fɛʁdinɑ̃ edwaʁ bɥisɔ̃]; 20 December 1841 – 16 February 1932) was a French educational public servant, pacifist, and Radical-Socialist (left liberal) politician. He presided over the League of Education from 1902 to 1906 and over the Human Rights League (LDH) from 1914 to 1926. In 1927, the Nobel Peace Prize was awarded to him jointly with Ludwig Quidde. A philosopher and educator, he was Director of Primary Education. He was the author of a thesis on Sebastian Castellio, in whom he saw a "liberal Protestant" in his image. Ferdinand Buisson was the president of the National Association of Freethinkers. In 1905, he chaired the parliamentary committee to implement the separation of church and state. Famous for his fight for secular education through the League of Education, he coined the term laïcité ("secularism").

== Biography ==
Ferdinand Buisson was a student at the Lycée Condorcet, then received his aggrégation in philosophy. A historical figure of liberal Protestantism, he voluntarily went into exile in Switzerland under the Second Empire, from 1866 to 1870, because he refused to swear allegiance to the new government.

== Career ==
Buisson was a professor at what became the University of Neuchâtel. Beginning in 1867, he attended three international conferences of the League of Peace and Freedom. At the last congress in Lausanne in 1869, he read a speech. Meanwhile, he tried to put in place a liberal Protestant church, calling pastors Jules Steeg and Felix Pécaut. After the announcement of the proclamation of the Republic, he returned to France and was actively involved in political and social initiatives of the municipality of 17th arrondissement. In December 1870, he became head of the 17th arrondissement municipal orphanage, the first secular orphanage, which later became the Seine orphanage. Refusing to teach philosophy because he was more willing to work for the poorest children, it was thanks to his friendship with the Minister of Public Instruction, Jules Simon, that he was appointed director of the Paris schools. Concerned about the future of the children in the orphanage, he connected with the philanthropist Joseph Gabriel Prevost and placed the children in his Prévost orphanage in Cempuis. In 1880, he appointed Paul Robin director of the orphanage.

From 1879 to 1896, Buisson was called by Jules Ferry, the successor of Jules Simon, the Directorate of Primary Education. In 1890, he became professor of education at the Sorbonne. He supervised the work of writing and designing the laws of secularism. In 1905, he was the chairman of the parliamentary committee that wrote the text of the law of separation of church and state. In 1898, as a supporter of Alfred Dreyfus, Buisson participated in the creation of the French League for Human Rights, which he was president from 1913 to 1926. Deputy of the Seine from 1902 to 1914, then from 1919 to 1924, he was a particularly strong advocate of vocational education and compulsory voting rights for women.

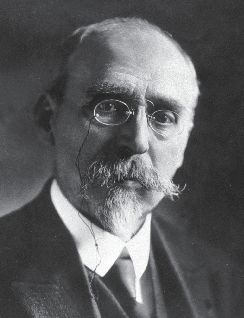
Ferdinand Buisson in the 1920s

Buisson was sympathetic to women's suffrage, unlike most Radicals, and was rapporteur of the committee that examined the proposal of Paul Dussaussoy for limited women's suffrage. The bill was pushed to the bottom of the agenda of the committee on voting rules. The President of the committee judged it important to separate the question of votes for women from the more important question of proportional representation, which was considered first. Buisson submitted a separate report on women's suffrage on 16 July 1909, some months after Dussaussoy's death. Buisson's report supported the proposal.

In 1914 and during the World War I, Buisson was one of the patriots and defended the Sacred Union. He was elected again from 1919 to 1924, and worked for Franco-German reconciliation, especially after the occupation of the Ruhr in 1923. An early supporter of the League of Nations, he invited German pacifists to Paris and travels to Berlin.

Ferdinand Buisson was also the prime contractor for a remarkable editorial project, the Dictionnaire de pédagogie et d'instruction primaire, for the writing of which he surrounded himself with more than 350 collaborators, and more particularly with James Guillaume who became its editor-in-chief. The first edition was published by Hachette between 1882 and 1887. A new edition was published in 1911. Not limited to the role of editorial responsibility, Buisson wrote entries such as Secularism, Intuition, and Prayer. His dictionary is considered the "Bible" of the secular, republican school system, and introduced the concept of a secular religious replacement. The Minister of Education, Vincent Peillon, was one of his disciples. A supporter from the beginning of the League of Nations, Buisson then devoted himself to Franco-German rapprochement, especially after the occupation of the Ruhr in 1923, inviting German pacifists to Paris and traveling to Berlin. He received the Nobel Peace Prize in 1927 with the German professor Ludwig Quidde.

== Tributes and distinctions ==
- Prix Marcelin Guérin of Académie Française, 1892
- Grand-officer de of Legion of honor, 1924
- Nobel Peace Prize, 1927
