= Joan Puig i Elias =

Catalan pedagogue and anarchist

- Born: July 30, 1898; Sallent
- Died: September 5, 1972 (aged 74); Porto Alegre
- Occupation: Educator
- Movement: Anarchism, Ferrer Movement

Joan Puig i Elias (1898–1972) was a Catalan pedagogue and anarchist from Spain who continued the work of Francisco Ferrer. During the Spanish Civil War he was president of the New Unified School Council.

== Biography ==
Having been affiliated with the Confederación Nacional del Trabajo (CNT) from a young age, he put Francisco Ferrer Guardia's school model Escuela Moderna into practice, in 1921, while working at the Escuela Natura in the El Clot neighborhood of Barcelona. His pedagogy intended to educate not only reason but also feelings in constant contact with Nature. "Paedocentrism, the observation of nature and curiosity as the engine of learning" were intended to be the foundations of teaching at Escuela Natura.

At the outbreak of the civil war and the social revolution in 1936, he was president of the New Unified School Council (CENU, in Catalan Consell de l'Escola Nova Unificado) which extended secular and libertarian pedagogy throughout Catalonia. He organized a campaign against illiteracy and in five months opened a hundred new school groups with more than 60,000 children.

After the May Days of Barcelona in 1937, he was appointed (in 1938) Subsecretary of Public Instruction and Health (the Minister was Segundo Blanco, also member of the CNT).

In 1939, after the defeat of the Republicans, he was exiled to France and he joined the French Resistance.

In 1952 he went to Brazil, and lived in Porto Alegre where he published his book El hombre, el medio y la Sociedad. The Determinants of Individual Behavior (1970). He died in 1972.

== See also ==
- Anarchism in Spain

== Bibliography ==
- Giacomoni, Valeria (2016). Joan Puig Elías: anarquismo, pedagogía y coherencia (in Spanish). Barcelona: Editorial Descontrol. ISBN 978-84-16553-81-5. OCLC 1025334331.
- Campoy, Glòria; Azorin, Jean Marc (2018). Joan Puig Elias: creador de un mundo nuevo. Colección Biografías y memorias (in Spanish). Madrid: Fundación de Estudios Libertarios Anselmo Lorenzo. ISBN 978-84-946807-5-5.
- Iñiguez, Miguel; Gómez Perín, Juan (2001). "Puig Elias, Juan". Esbozo de una enciclopedia histórica del anarquismo español (in Spanish). Madrid: Fundación de Estudios Libertarios Anselmo Lorenzo. p. 497. ISBN 978-84-86864-45-3. OCLC 490984440.
- "Joan Puig i Elias". Gran enciclopèdia catalana (in Catalan).
- Navarro, Ramon (1979). L'educació a Catalunya durant la Generalitat, 1931–1939 (in Catalan). Barcelona: Edicions 62. ISBN 978-84-297-1480-7.
