= Cempuis =

- Commune
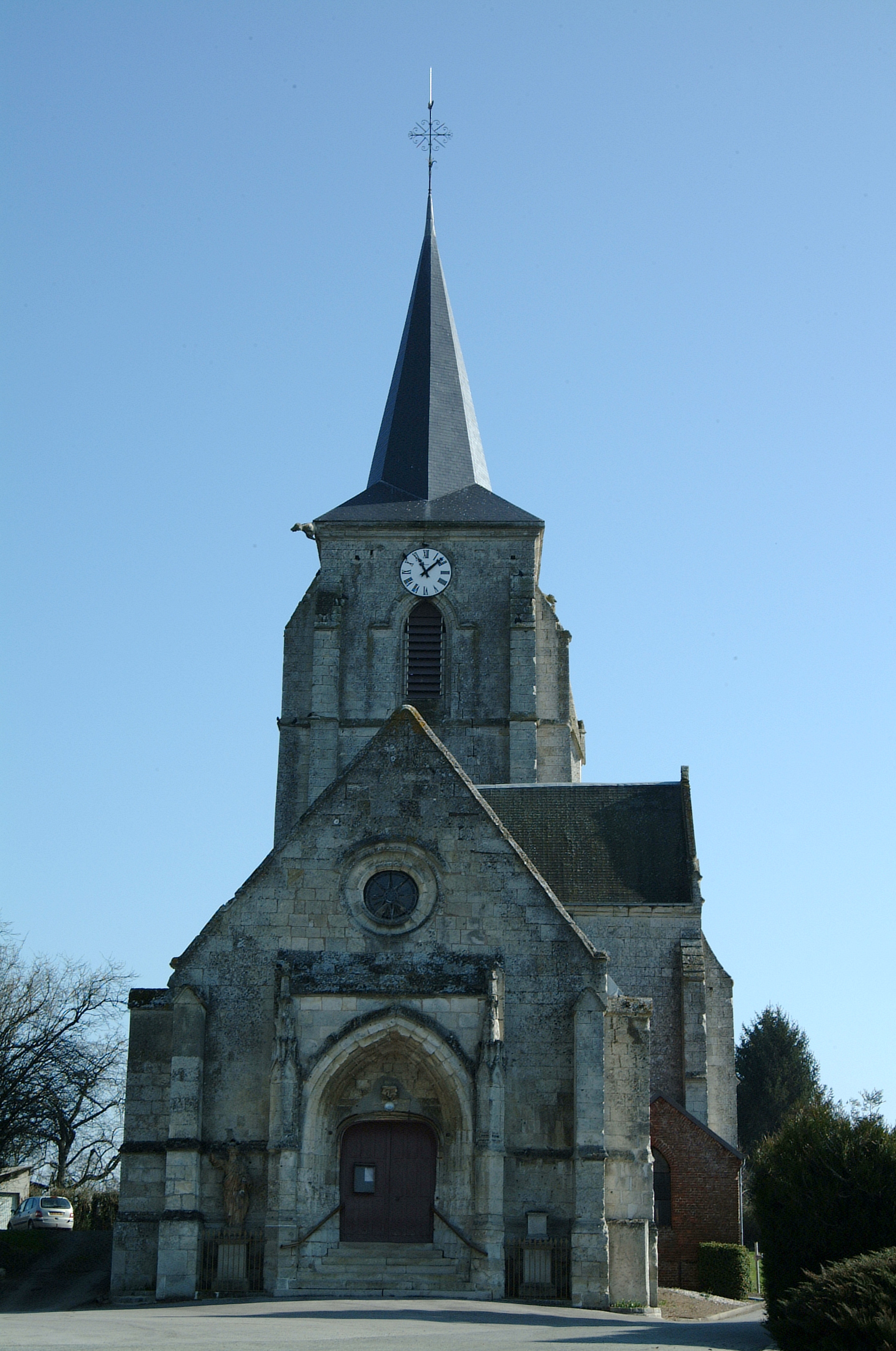
- Saint-Nicolas
- Location of Cempuis
- Location within France Location within Hauts-de-France
- Coordinates: 49°39′33″N 1°59′15″E
- Country: France
- Region: Hauts-de-France
- Department: Oise
- Arrondissement: Beauvais
- Canton: Grandvilliers
- Intercommunality: Picardie Verte

Government
  - Mayor (2020–2026): Marc Houbigand
- Area^{1}: 9.38 km^{2} (3.62 sq mi)
- Elevation: 117 m (384 ft)
- Highest elevation: 198 m (650 ft)
- Lowest elevation: 137 m (449 ft)
- Population (2023): 467
  - Density: 49.8/km^{2} (129/sq mi)
- Time zone: UTC+01:00 (CET)
  - Summer (DST): UTC+02:00 (CEST)
- INSEE/Postal code: 60136 /60210
- ^{1} French Land Register data, which excludes lakes, ponds, glaciers > 1 km^{2} (0.386 sq mi or 247 acres) and river estuaries.

Cempuis (French pronunciation: [sɑ̃pɥi]) is a commune in the Oise department in northern France.

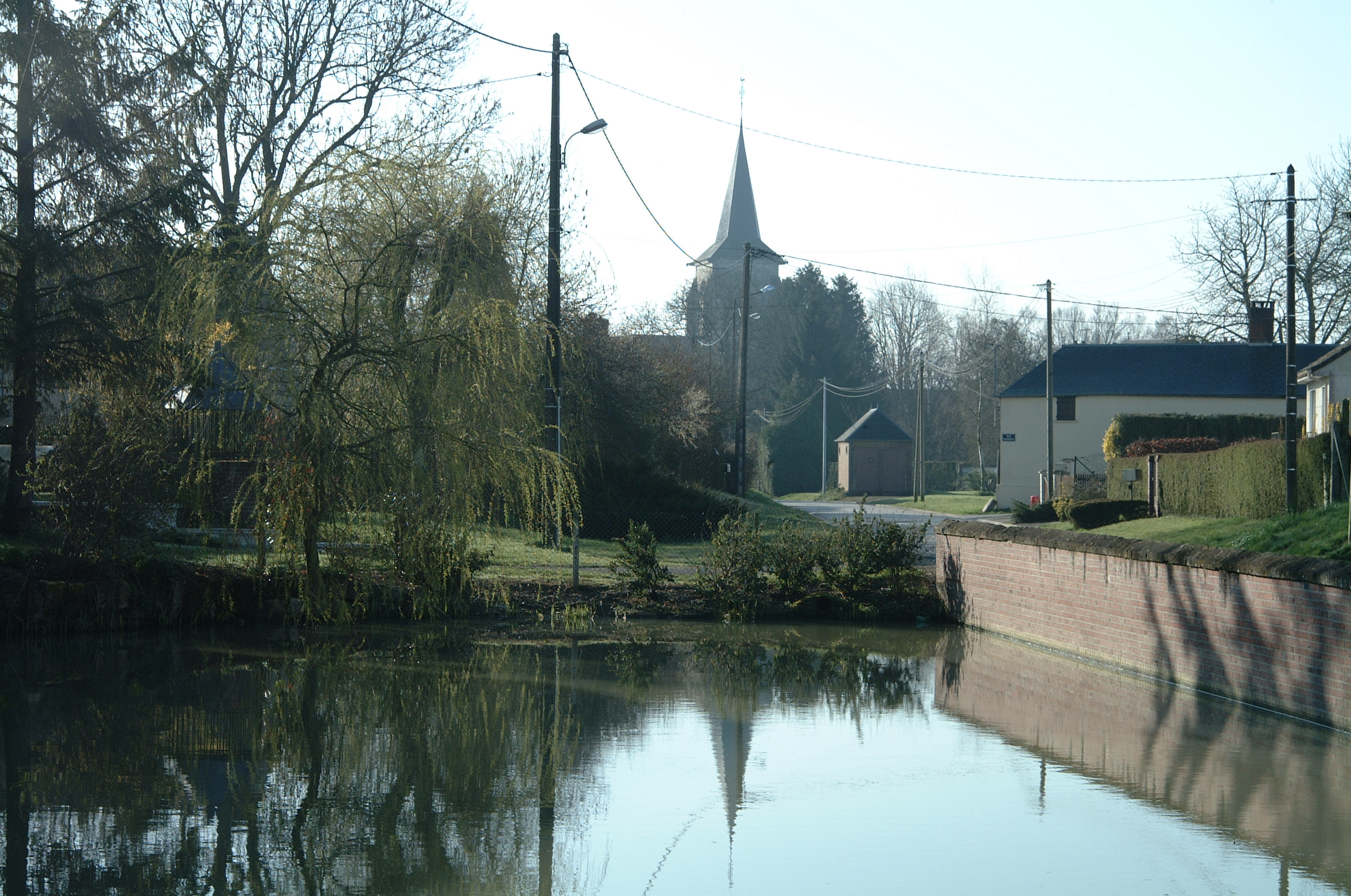
Cempuis - the pond

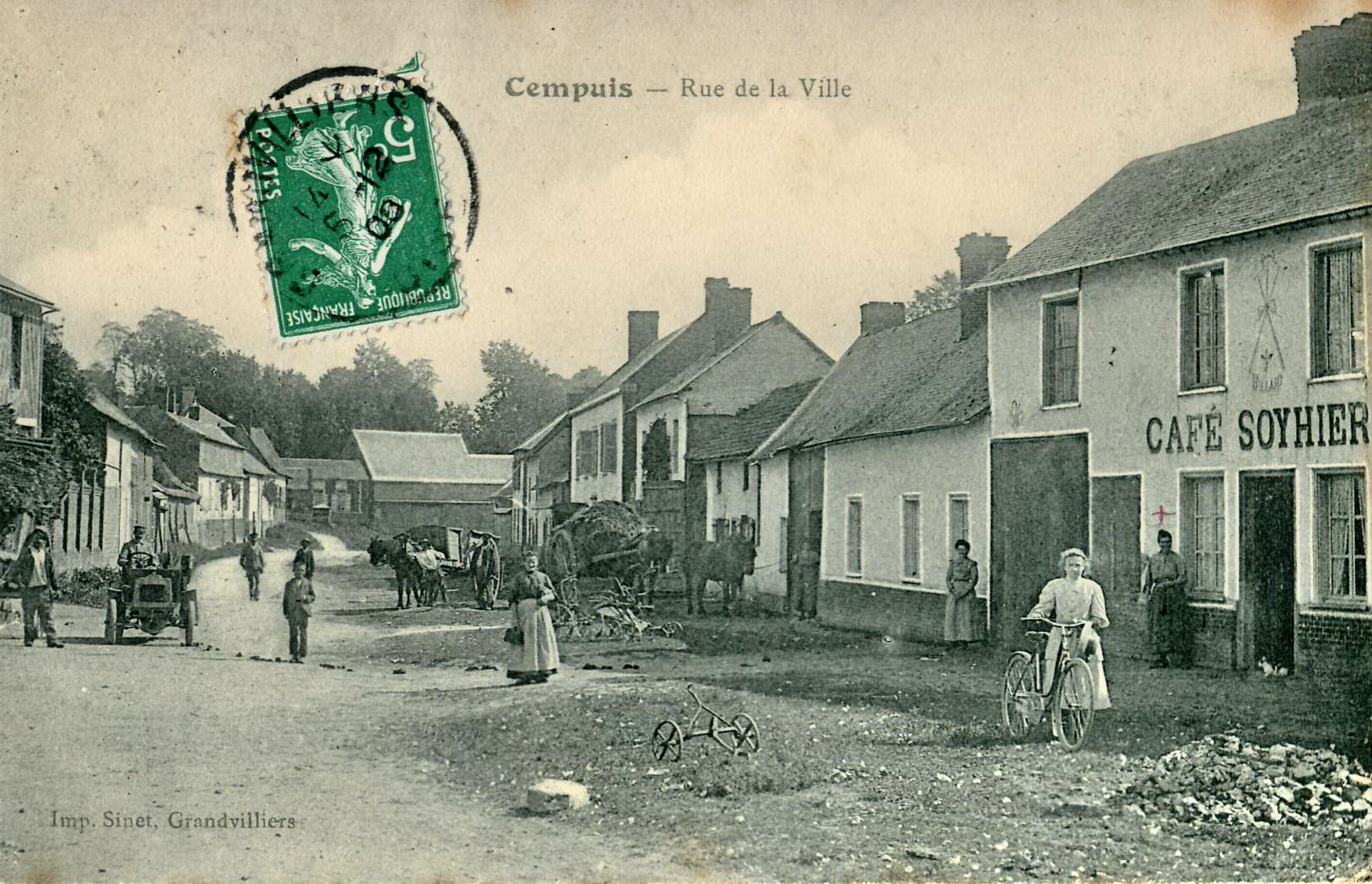
The main street at the beginning of the 20th century

== Geography ==
Village is situated on the plateau of Picardie near Grandvilliers

== History ==
A knight from Cempuis was first written about in the 12th Century.

== Sights ==
Prévost orphanage: The first mixed orphanage in France founded by Paul Robin, who was the director from 1880 to 1894. Since being managed by the Seine département, it is now managed by the Fondation d'Auteuil.

Saint-Nicolas church: 14th Century choir, Vaulted chapel from the Renaissance period. Wooden carvings from the eighteenth century. Stature of Christ in wood from the fifteenth century.

ECCE HOMO chapel: Built in 1728, situated in the center of the lower village.

Wells: The village has underground chambers that were reinforced but damaged and filled in due to earth movements. It is said that the 100 wells or "cent-puits" in French that gave access to some of these chambers was the origin of the name of the village.

Below, four of the many wells that are to be found in the village.

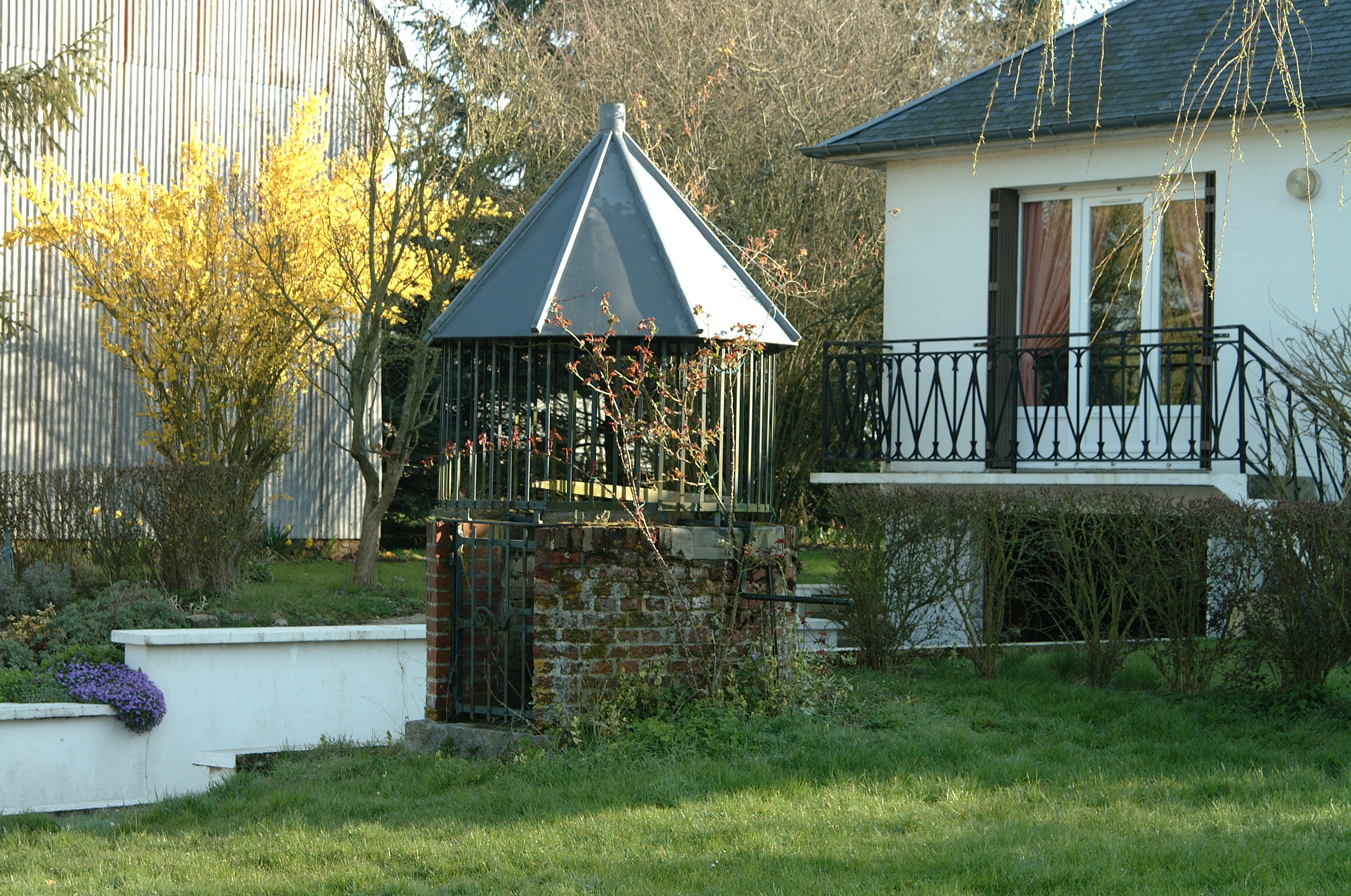

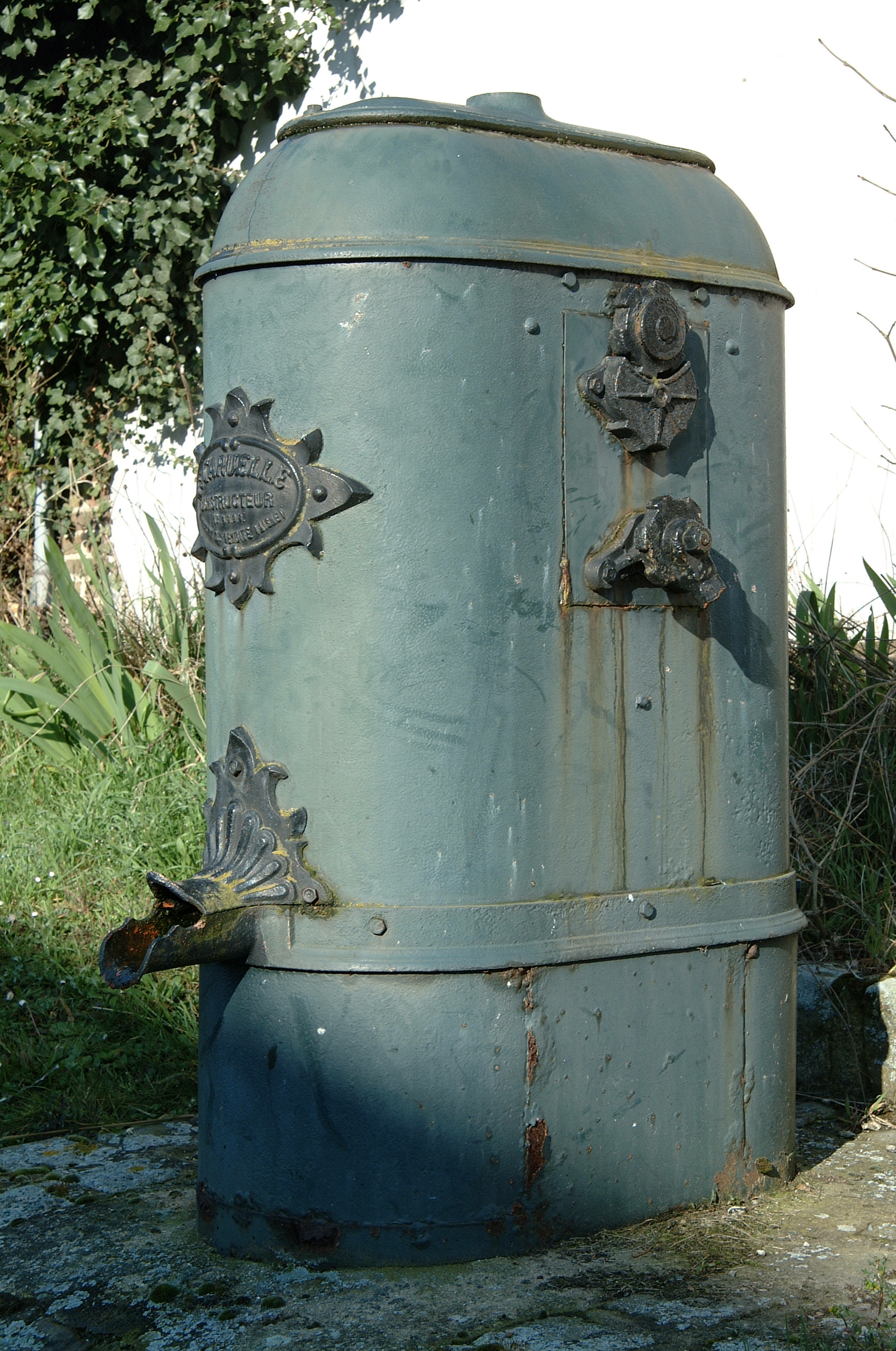

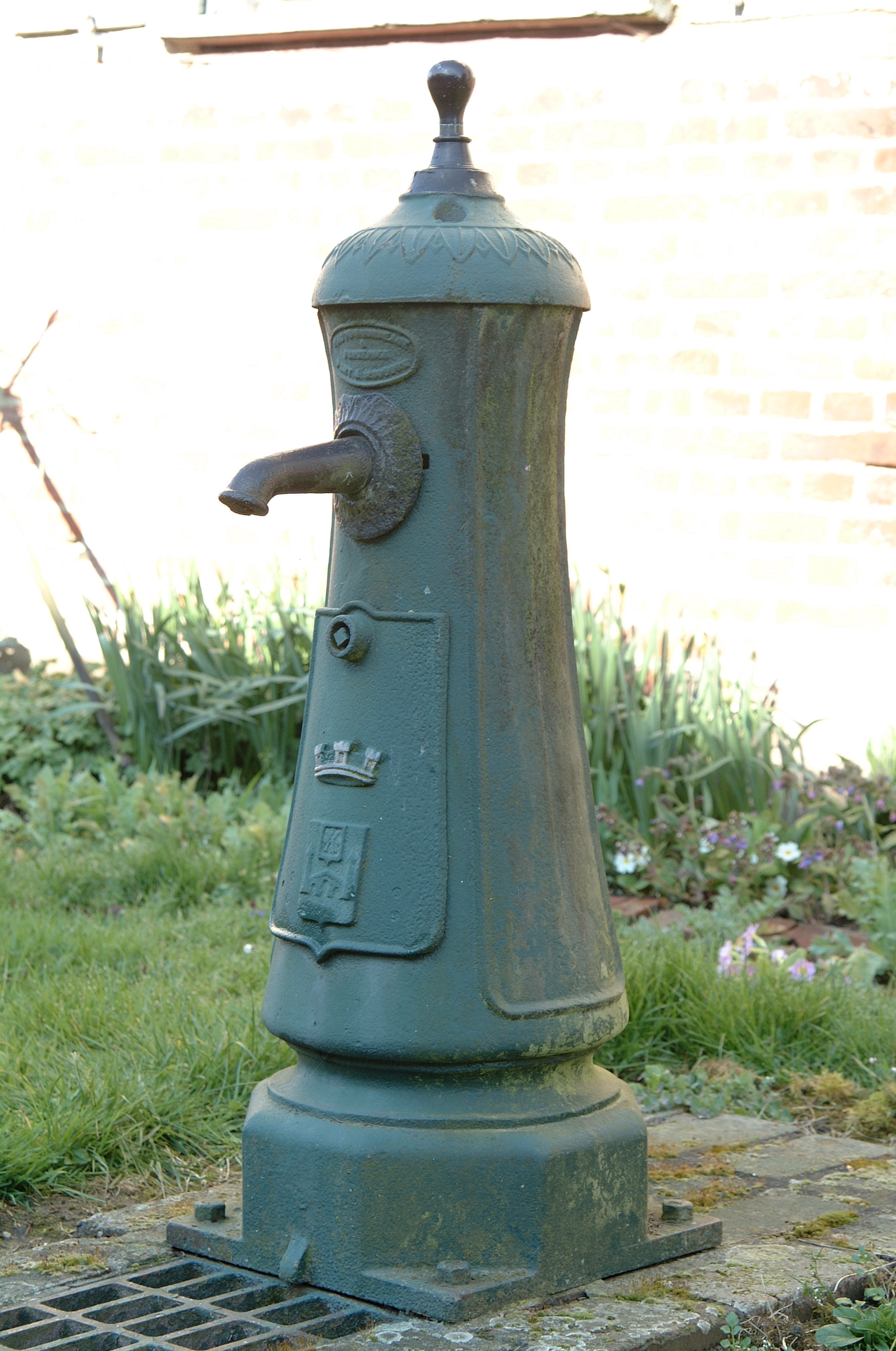

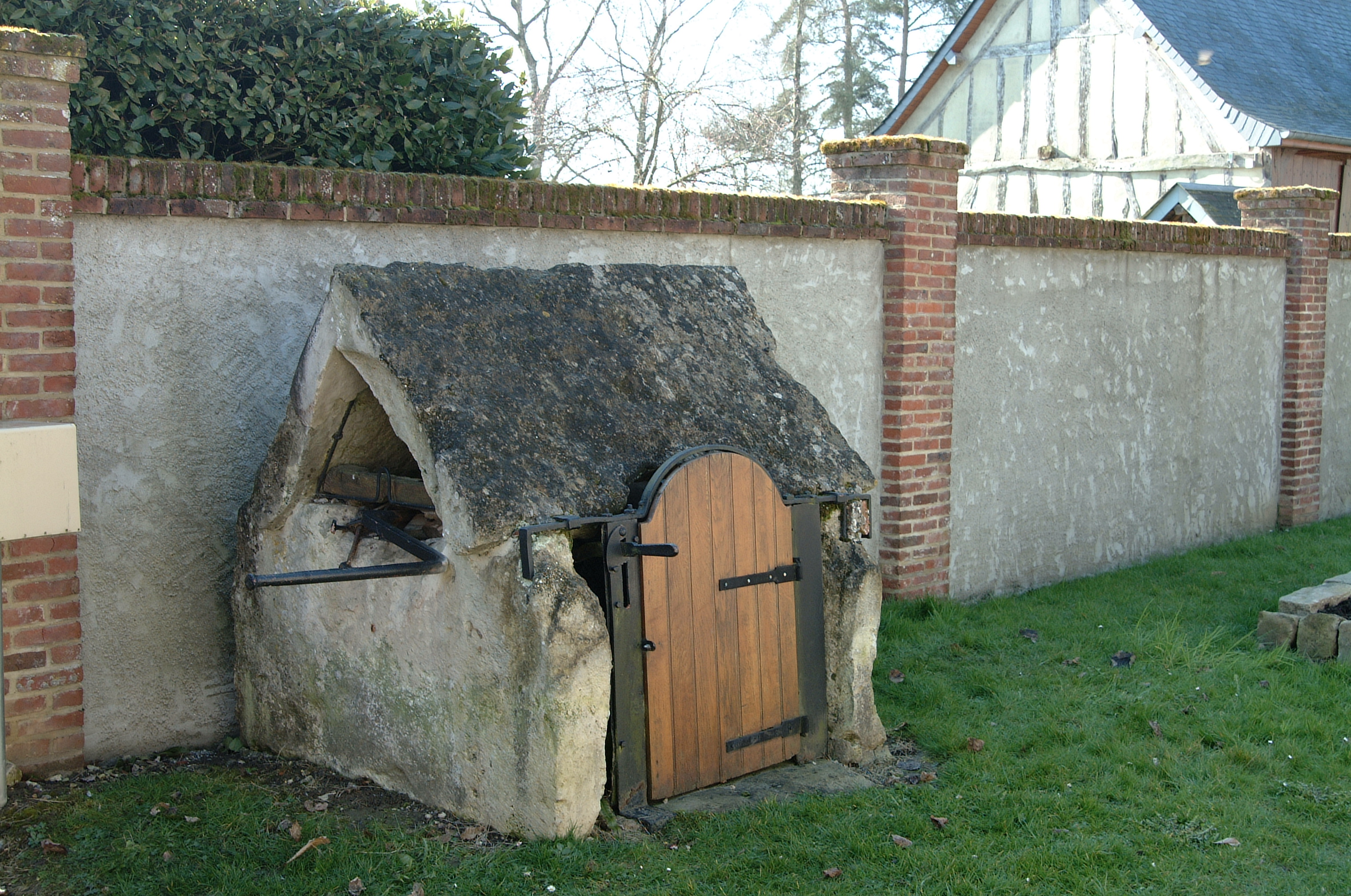

Below, Aerial view of Cempuis - Looking towards the North East.

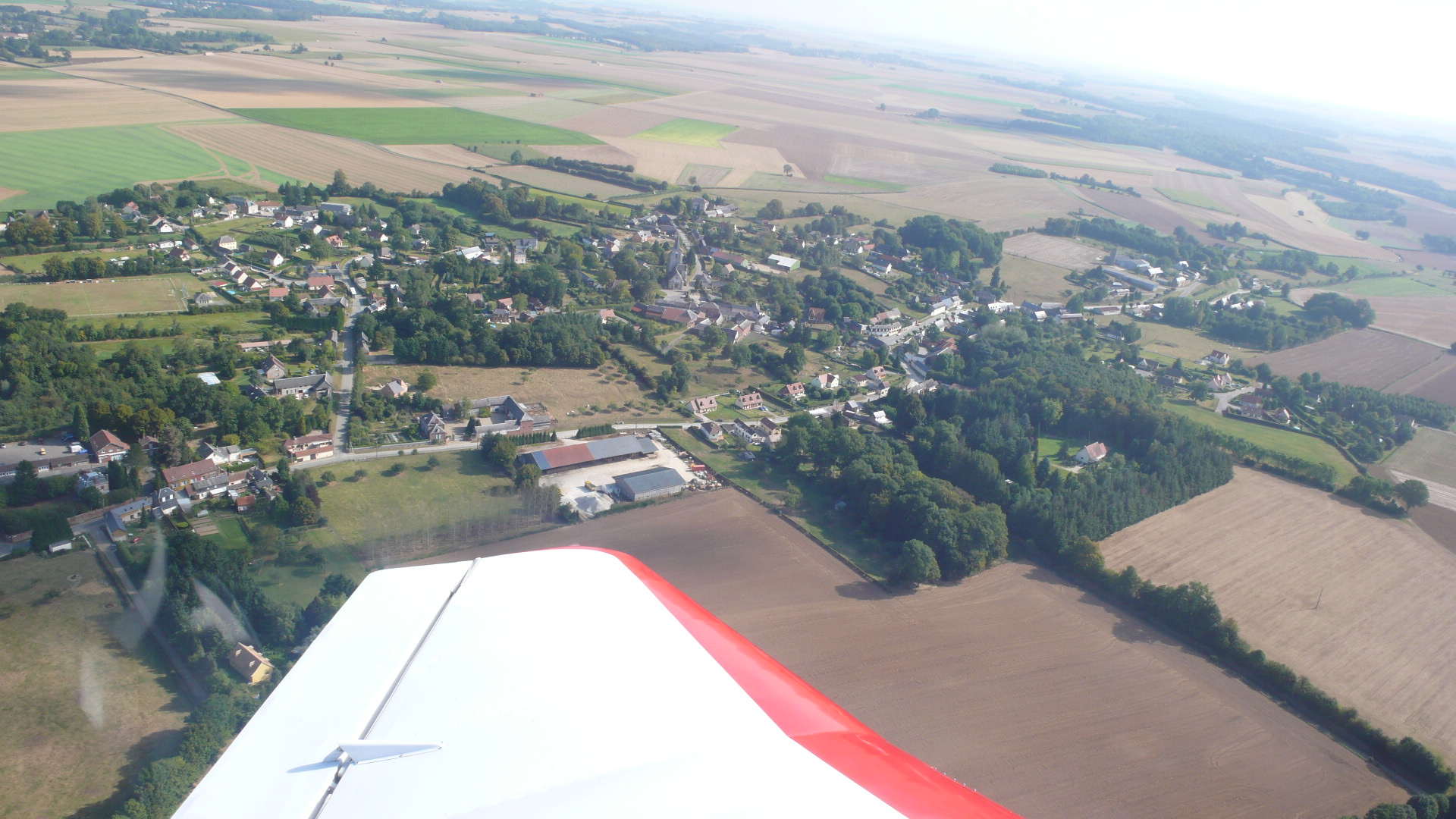
Aerial view of Cempuis

== See also ==
- Communes of the Oise department
