= José Sánchez Rosa =

Andalusian anarchist

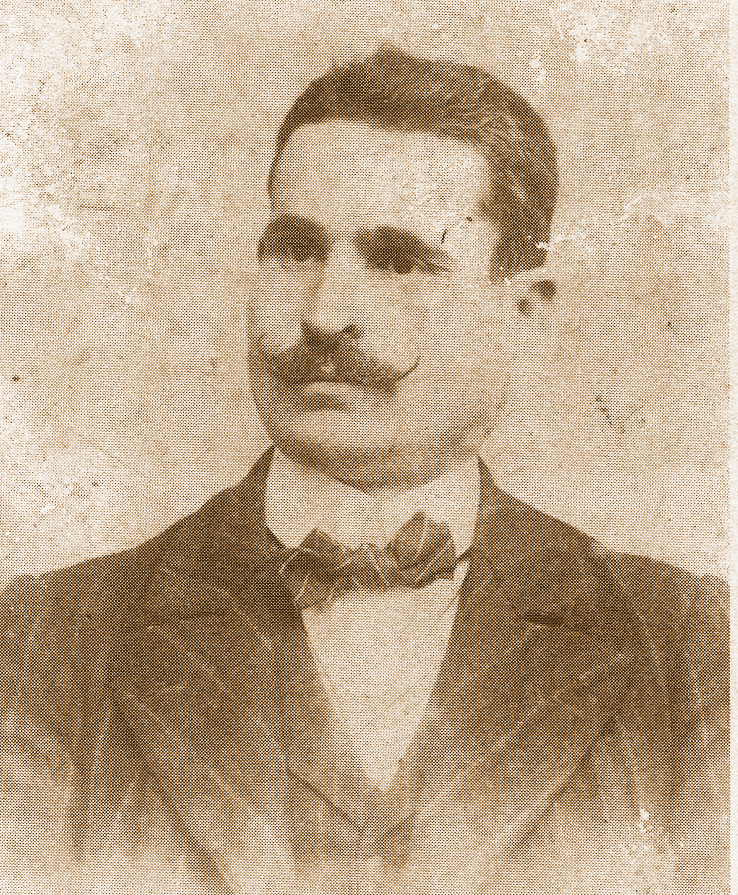
- Sánchez Rosa, c. 1895
- Born: 22 October 1864; Grazalema, Cádiz, Andalusia, Spain
- Died: 31 July 1936 (aged 71); Seville, Andalusia, Spain
- Cause of death: Murder
- Other name: Salvochea
- Occupations: Shoemaker, teacher
- Organization: National Confederation of Labour (1918–1920)

José Sánchez Rosa was an Andalusian anarchist activist and teacher. Arrested and imprisoned for his part in the Jerez uprising, after his release in the early 20th century, he returned to anarchist agitation and established a number of rationalist schools throughout Andalusia. He established the Andalusian regional branch of the National Confederation of Labour (CNT), but was expelled after a few years due to his growing influence over the organisation. After being internally exiled on three occasions, he was murdered by Carlists during the July 1936 military uprising.

== Biography ==
José Sánchez Rosa was born on 22 October 1864, in the Andalusian town of Grazalema. He was the son of a shoemaker and, after working as a farmworker from a young age, set up his own shoe shop in Jerez. He received only two years of formal education. In 1892, he was arrested during the Jerez uprising, under suspicion of organising the riot, and sentenced to life imprisonment. He was imprisoned in the Fortaleza del Hacho, in Ceuta, until he was released under an amnesty in 1901. He settled in Los Barrios with his family and went to work as a schoolteacher. He soon returned to anarchist activism, attempting to unite anarchists into a permanent organisation that could coordinate collective action. In 1903, he attended an anarchist congress in Madrid and participated in a propaganda campaign with Joan Montseny. In 1904, he opened a school in Aznalcóllar, and in 1910, he opened a school in Seville.

In Seville, he joined a Masonic lodge of the Grande Oriente Español and a rationalist education group. He travelled throughout Andalusia on a propaganda tour, distributing anarchist literature and debating other left-wing activists. In 1915, he participated in the Ferrol Anti-Militarist Congress. In 1918, he established the Andalusian branch of the National Confederation of Labour (CNT) and an Andalusian anarchist federation, and the following year, he established a tenants union. For his sustained anarchist activism, he was internally exiled to Extremadura.

By 1920, Sánchez was expelled from the CNT, which distrusted his growing influence within the Andalusian movement. He nevertheless continued engaging in anarchist activism, attending a national anarchist congress in April 1923. In 1925, he was internally exiled to Murcia by dictatorship of Primo de Rivera. After the fall of the regime in 1930, he returned to Seville, reopened his school there and resumed his collaboration with Montseny on La Revista Blanca. Following the proclamation of the Second Spanish Republic, in 1932, he was deported to Western Sahara and imprisoned. He eventually returned to Seville, where he was caught in the July 1936 military uprising, kidnapped by Carlists and murdered on the night of 31 July 1936. His body was interred in a mass grave.

== Selected works ==
- La idea anarquista (1903)
- La aritmética del obrero (1909)
- Diálogo. El obrero sindicalista y su patrono (1911)
- El abogado del obrero (1912)

== Bibliography ==
- Bookchin, Murray (1978) [1977]. The Spanish Anarchists: The Heroic Years, 1868–1936. Harper & Row. ISBN 0-06-090607-3.
- Gutiérrez Molina, José Luis (2022). "José Sánchez Rosa". Historia Hispánica (in Spanish). Royal Academy of History.
- Kaplan, Temma (1977). Anarchists of Andalusia, 1868–1903. Princeton University Press. ISBN 9781400869718. OCLC 905864307.
