= The Modern School Movement (book) =

Book by Paul Avrich

- First edition
- Author: Paul Avrich
- Cover artist: Rockwell Kent, Boy and Leaping Stag - 1917
- Published: 1980 (Princeton University Press)
- Pages: 480
- ISBN: 0-691-04669-7
- OCLC: 489692159

The Modern School Movement: Anarchism and Education in the United States is a history book about Ferrer Schools by Paul Avrich.
