= Prévost orphanage =

Former orphanage in northern France

The Prévost orphanage in Cempuis (French: L'Orphelinat Prévost de Cempuis) was an orphanage in northern France best known for its experimental libertarian education under the direction of anarchist pedagogue Paul Robin between 1880 and 1894.

== History ==
Following the Paris Commune and disintegration of the French left in the early 1870s, anarchist pedagogue Paul Robin turned to education reform. While teaching French at the Woolwich Royal Military Academy, developed his ideas through the rest of the decade, just as France began a turn towards a free, compulsory, and secular education system.

Robin became the supervisor of the Prévost orphanage in Cempuis in December 1880. He received the offer through the old boy network: his friend James Guillaume asked head of primary education Ferdinand Buisson to find Robin a position. Buisson and another friend of Robin's, Aristide Rey, were guiding the Prévost bequest, in which the Saint-Simonian Joseph Gabriel Prévost established an orphanage in Cempuis in 1861 and set aside money for its continuance after his 1875 death. The Seine department briefly used the building for administration in 1880, as Robin returned to France to run the orphanage as a 14-year experiment.

The orphanage grew from 58 to 180 children between 1880 and the 1890s, including boys and girls between the ages of eight and fourteen. He integrated his family with the orphanage, treating his charges as if they were his children and vice versa. This lost him the affection of his children but endeared him to his orphans. His disciple and biographer, Gabriel Giroud, was one such orphan.

Robin sought to provide an "integrated education" that combined intellectual and manual learning, both arts and sciences. Influenced by Charles Fourier's concept of la papillonne, he wanted students to have the freedom of moving between physical, intellectual, and moral tasks, so as to foster creativity. He also wanted early education to be spontaneous, as if knowledge was transmitted by chance.

Much of what is known about the Prévost orphanage's pedagogy comes from Giroud and the bulletin compiled by the students.

== Bibliography ==
- McLaren, Angus (1981). "Revolution and Education in Late Nineteenth Century France: The Early Career of Paul Robin". History of Education Quarterly. 21 (3): 317–335. doi:10.2307/367701. ISSN 0018-2680. JSTOR 367701. S2CID 144554104.
