= Jean Allemane =

French socialist politician

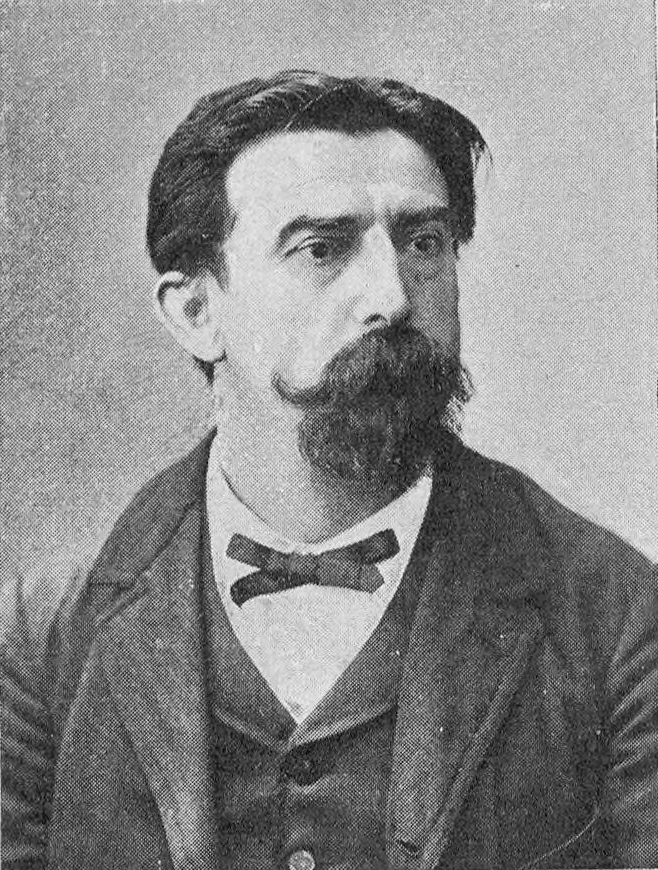

Personal details
- Born: August 25, 1843 Sauveterre-de-Comminges, Haute-Garonne, France
- Died: June 6, 1935 (aged 91) Herblay, Seine-et-Oise, France
- Resting place: Père Lachaise Cemetery
- Party: POF; FTSF; POSR; SFIO
- Occupation: Typesetter, printer, journalist, trade unionist, politician

Jean Allemane (25 August 1843, Sauveterre-de-Comminges, Haute-Garonne – 6 June 1935, Herblay in Seine-et-Oise) was a French socialist politician, veteran of the Paris Commune of 1871, pioneer of syndicalism, leader of the Socialist-Revolutionary Workers' Party (POSR) and co-founder of the unified French Section of the Workers' International (SFIO) in 1905. He was a deputy in the National Assembly of the Third French Republic.

== Early life: labour activist and Communard ==
Jean Allemane was born into a working-class family in Sauveterre-de-Comminges (Haute-Garonne) in southern France. In 1853, he came to Paris with his parents and was apprenticed as a printer. The hardship of working conditions, the republican sympathies of his family and the writings of Pierre-Joseph Proudhon conspired to radicalise Allemane early on. As a teenager he became involved in trade union activity, which was still illegal in France (unions were not legalised until 1906). In 1862, aged 19, he was arrested for his role in organising the first typesetters' strike in Paris. Subsequently, he helped found the typesetters' union. Despite his youth, Allemane played an important role in the emerging French syndicalist movement and emphasised the need for workers to form their own organisations, independent of bourgeois radicals.

In 1870, Allemane served in the Parisian National Guard, where he became a corporal. In this capacity, he participated in the uprising of the Paris Commune at the end of the Franco-Prussian War of 1871. Although he welcomed the fall of Napoléon III, he mistrusted the conservative republicans around Adolphe Thiers who replaced him. In the Commune, Allemane sympathised with the Proudhonist faction. Allemane participated actively in the fighting. After the suppression of the Commune, he went into hiding but was captured, and in 1872, he was sentenced to hard labour in perpetuity into Fort Quélern and banished to the penal colony of New Caledonia. In 1876 he made an unsuccessful attempt to escape. In 1878, he was ordered to participate in suppressing a revolt of the native population but refused. This led to further penalties. However, in 1879, a general amnesty enabled Allemane to return to France.

== Socialist partisan politics: POF, FTSF, POSR ==
In 1880, Allemane became a typesetter at the radical newspaper L'Intransigeant, founded by the republican Henri Rochefort. That year, he became a founding member of the French Workers' Party (POF), founded by Jules Guesde and Paul Lafargue. Guesde and Lafargue were by then Marxists (and Lafargue was Marx' son-in-law), but the POF was not yet a homogeneous Marxist party, and Allemane sympathised with syndicalist and Proudhonist tendencies. In 1882, he supported the 'Possibilist' Paul Brousse in his conflict with Guesde. Like Allemane and Guesde himself, Brousse had been a Communard and had once sympathised with anarchism, but in the 1880s, the party he led – the Federation of the Socialist Workers of France (FTSF) – adopted an increasingly reformist course. Allemane became increasingly discenchanted with this. In his own journal, Parti Ouvrier, he called for a more radical course and advocated syndicalist ideas such as a general strike that was to precipitate a revolution, direct action (sabotage, strikes, factory occupations) and the formation of separate proletarian organisations not subject to bourgeois leadership.

=== Anti-Boulangist, Dreyfusard ===
During the Boulangist crisis of 1886–1889, when the popular nationalist General Boulanger seemed to threaten a coup d'état, Allemane became one of the most vocal defenders of the Republic. This temporarily re-enforced his alliance with Brousse and with reformist socialists and republicans who opposed the general. (By contrast, the Guesdists and the Blanquists maintained an attitude of neutrality between the 'bourgeois general' and the 'bourgeois republic'.) However, once the crisis had passed, Allemane's radicalism put him at odds with the Possibilists and reformists. In 1890 he was expelled from the FTSF and formed his own party, the French Socialist-Revolutionary Workers' Party (Parti Ouvrier Socialiste-Révolutionnaire), which called for a general strike, worked closely with the trade union movement and rejected bourgeois parliamentary democracy as insufficiently democratic. Nevertheless, the Allemanists, as they were called, stood for elections, and Allemane later became a deputy in the National Assembly. The Guesdists, as orthodox Marxists, strongly criticised Allemanism: 'general strike is general nonsense' was their slogan, and trade unions should be placed firmly under the political leadership of a socialist party. By contrast, the Allemanists insisted on the autonomy of the trade unions and saw the socialist party merely as the political representative of the extra-parliamentary workers' movement.

Allemane's support of the labour movement and his involvement in the CGT translated into working-class support for his party. In January 1901 he ran successfully against the antisemite Max Régis in a Paris by-election for the Chamber of Deputies. He was elected again in 1906. During the Dreyfus affair, Allemane was a staunch defender of the Jewish officer, who, it turned out, was unjustly accused of treason. He denounced the rising tide of anti-Semitism. Again, this aligned him with the Broussists and reformist socialists around Jean Jaurès. (The Guesdists and Blanquists regarded the Dreyfus Affair as a quarrel within the bourgeoisie.) In 1899, the Independent Socialist Alexandre Millerand precipitated a fierce controversy in French and European socialism by joining a bourgeois republican cabinet – something no socialist had done since Louis Blanc's ill-fated participation in the Provisional Government of the Second Republic in 1848. The controversy over Millerandism coincided with the Revisionist controversy in German Social-Democracy and with the controversy over 'Economism' among Russian Marxists. Revolutionary socialists like Guesde and Édouard Vaillant saw all three phenomena as a betrayal of the working class; Jaurès and the reformists supported Millerand, albeit reluctantly. Allemane took an intermediate position, sceptical of participation in bourgeois cabinets but willing to support reformist social legislation. Eventually, Millerand left the socialist party altogether.

== Unification of French socialism ==
Despite the quarrel over Millerandism, the Second International was putting pressure on the many French socialist organisations to come together. In 1902, a first attempt at unification failed, because the differences between centralists and federalists, revolutionaries and reformists, were still too great. The centralist and revolutionary POF of Guesde united with Vaillant's Blanquist Socialist-Revolutionary Party and with the small Revolutionary Communist Alliance (ACR), which had splintered off from Allemane's POSR. These groups formed the Socialis Party of France (PSdF). Meanwhile, Allemane's POSR joined with Brousse's FTSF and the Independent Socialists of Jean Jaurès to form the French Socialist Party (PSF). (Note: Other radicals who considered themselves socialists refused to join either the PSdF or the PSF. Since 1901, the Radical-Socialist Party united left-leaning republicans in the tradition of Louis Blanc and Alexandre Ledru-Rollin; in the course of the twentieth century, this party migrated to the centre-right and is now affiliated with the conservative Union for a Popular Movement (UMP). René Viviani's Republican-Socialist Party was slightly to the left of the Radical-Socialists. Some dissident Blanquists who had sympathised with Boulangism, meanwhile, had formed a splinter party that migrated to the far right. Revolutionary syndicalists also greeted both socialist parties with scepticism.) The two rival socialist parties were finally merged in 1905 into the French Section of the Workers' International (SFIO Party). Allemane served as a deputy for the SFIO from 1906 to 1910, representing the XIth arrondissement of Paris. Even as deputy, Allemane maintained his work as a printer and founded a printers' co-operative called La Productrice, which serve as a socialist print shop. In 1910, he published his Memoirs of a Communard.

== War and the appeal of radicalism of the left and right ==
The outbreak of World War I bitterly divided the French socialists (as it did the socialists of most countries). Allemane had been a staunch opponent of militarism in his previous writings, but in 1914, he supported war 'in defence of the nation'. Anti-war critics on the left saw this as a grave betrayal. However, although he was sceptical of Leninism and had never really embraced Marxism, he accepted the October Revolution. In 1920, at its 18th Congress in Tours, the SFIO split over the question whether to remain in the Second International or join Lenin's new Third International. The majority voted the join the Third International and henceforth called itself 'French Section of the Communist International', subsequently renamed French Communist Party (PCF). Allemane voted with the majority for adhesion to the Third International, because its radicalism appealed to him. Nevertheless, he did not join the PCF. Instead, in the 1920s, he flirted with the National Socialist party of Gustave Hervé (formerly an anti-militarist socialist but, since 1914, a staunch nationalist). This group sought to unite socialists who had taken a 'patriotic' position during the First World War, but it also attracted old Boulangist and anti-Dreyfusard elements, as well as anti-Marxist syndicalists. In the course of the 1920s, this party developed more and more in a fascist direction. Allemane, however, never actually played a role in this party. Instead, in his last years he concentrated on the activities of his Masonic lodge, a group he believed to be particularly susceptible to Socialist pressure. (Note: "IL appartint à la franc-maçonnerie, de toutes les associations philosophiques la plus perméable à la propagande socialiste." Translation. "He was attached to Free-Masonry, which of all philosophical groups was the most permeable to socialist propaganda.") Jean Allemane joined Les Rénovateurs de Clichy, a lodge from Grand Orient de France, the same lodge as Jean-Baptiste Clément, Le temps des cerises song composer. He died in 1935 at Herblay in Seine-et-Oise.
