= Socialist Revolutionary Party (France) =

Socialist Revolutionary Party Parti socialiste révolutionnaire
- Abbreviation: PSR
- Leader: Édouard Vaillant
- Founded: 1898
- Dissolved: 1901
- Merger of: Central Revolutionary Committee; Revolutionary Communist Alliance
- Merged into: Socialist Party of France
- Ideology: Blanquism; Revolutionary socialism
- Political position: Left-wing

The Socialist Revolutionary Party (French: Parti socialiste révolutionnaire, PSR) was a French Blanquist political party founded in 1898 and dissolved in 1901. It is indirectly one of the founding factions of the French Section of the Workers' International (SFIO), founded in 1905.

The PSR was the new name given, in 1898, to the Central Revolutionary Committee (CRC), a blanquist party founded in 1881. The CRC had been strengthened by the formation of the Revolutionary Communist Alliance (ACR) by dissident members of the reformist Revolutionary Socialist Workers' Party (POSR). Due to the support of the ACR, the PSR became the second largest Marxist political party in France behind the French Workers' Party.

The PSR was led by Édouard Vaillant, who sought to be the middle ground between moderate socialists (Jean Jaurès, Paul Brousse) and Marxists (Jules Guesde, Paul Lafargue). The PSR, however, later merged with the French Workers' Party (POF) to form the Socialist Party of France (PSdF). The PSdF was one of the two founding members of the French Section of the Workers' International (SFIO) in 1905.

== Notable members ==
- Madame Sorgue
- Édouard Vaillant

== See also ==
- Bloc des gauches
- Communism in France
- French Section of the Workers' International
- French Socialist Party
- French Workers' Party
- History of the Left in France
- Marxist philosophy
- Paris Commune
- Socialist Party of France
