= Revolutionary Communist Alliance =

French political party

Revolutionary Communist Alliance Alliance communiste révolutionnaire
- Abbreviation: ACR
- Leader: Arthur Groussier
- Founded: September 1896
- Dissolved: 1901
- Split from: Revolutionary Socialist Workers' Party
- Merged into: Socialist Party of France
- Ideology: Marxism; Communism
- Political position: Left-wing
- National affiliation: Socialist Revolutionary Party

The Revolutionary Communist Alliance (French: Alliance communiste révolutionnaire, ACR) or Communist Alliance (French: Alliance communiste, AC) was a French political party founded in 1896 and dissolved in 1901.

The ACR was the name adopted by activists who left the Revolutionary Socialist Workers' Party (POSR) in 1896. In 1897, the ACR joined the Central Revolutionary Committee led by Édouard Vaillant, which became the Socialist Revolutionary Party (PSR). The PSR was the second largest Marxist party in France behind the French Workers' Party (POF) led by Jules Guesde. The ACR apparently operated semi-autonomously within the PSR before the ACR and PSR merged into the Socialist Party of France in 1902.

== See also ==
- History of the Left in France
- Revolutionary Socialist Workers' Party
- Socialist Revolutionary Party
- Blanquism
