= International Socialist Congress, Paris 1900 =

The 5th International Socialist Congress of the Second International era was held in Paris from September 23 to 27 in Paris. It was originally supposed to be held in Germany in 1899, but difficulties with the German authorities prevented this.

The Congress is notable for establishing the International Socialist Bureau, the permanent organization of the International, as well as with dealing with the questions of the socialist attitude toward reformism and colonialism.

On reformism, the Congress specifically addressed the question of socialists entering bourgeois governments. In 1899 the socialist Alexandre Millerand had taken a ministerial position in the French government of Pierre Waldeck-Rousseau, alongside the Marquis de Galliffet, who had led the suppression of the Paris Commune. Karl Kautsky proposed a compromise resolution to the effect that the entry of a socialist into a bourgeois government was not a normal but a transitional and exceptional emergency measure, and that Millerand's action was not a matter of principle but of tactics, acceptable if it had the mandate of his party. The resolution was adopted by a vote of 29–9 over Jules Guesde’s demand for unconditional condemnation of ministerialism.

== Delegations ==
| Country | # of delegates | Notes |
|---|---|---|
| Germany | 57 | Representing the Social Democratic Party |
| Great Britain | 95 | |
| Austria | 10 | |
| Bohemia | 2 | |
| Bulgaria | 3 | |
| Belgium | 37 | Representing the Belgian Workers Party |
| Denmark | 19 | |
| Spain | 4 | Representing the Spanish Socialist Workers' Party and the Unión General de Trabajadores |
| United States | 6 | |
| France | 600 | Representing the French Workers' Party, Revolutionary Socialist Party (France), Federation of the Socialist Workers of France, |
| Netherlands | 9 | |
| Norway | 1 | |
| Hungary | 1 | |
| Italy | 15 | |
| Poland | 20 | |
| Portugal | 1 | (represented by Jean Jaurès) |
| Romania | 1 | |
| Russia | 24 | |
| Ireland | 3 | |
| Argentina | 1 | |
| Sweden | 3 | |
| Switzerland | 10 | |

== Resolutions ==
The Congress passed resolutions on the following:

- Creating a committee to establish permanent institutions of the International, what would become the International Socialist Bureau and secretariat
- International labor legislation
- International peace and militarism
- The organization of the proletariat, expropriation of the bourgeoisie and socialization of the means of production.
- Colonial policy
- Universal suffrage
- The general strike
- Trusts
- May Day
