= Federation of the Socialist Workers of France =

Federation of the Socialist Workers of France Fédération des travailleurs socialistes de France
- Abbreviation: FSTF
- Leader: Paul Brousse
- Founder: Jules Guesde; Paul Lafargue
- Founded: October 31, 1879
- Dissolved: May 24, 1902
- Merged into: French Socialist Party
- Ideology: Majority: Socialism; Possibilism (from 1882); Factions; Possibilism; Guesdism (until 1882); Blanquism (until 1881); Anarchism (until 1881); Mutualism (until 1880)
- Political position: Left-wing to Far-left (until 1882); Centre-left to Left-wing (from 1882)
- Colours: Red

The Federation of the Socialist Workers of France (French: Fédération des travailleurs socialistes de France, FTSF) was France's first socialist party, being founded in 1879.

The party was characterised as possibilist because it promoted gradual reforms.

== Formation ==
After the failure of the Paris Commune (1871), French socialism was beheaded as its leaders were dead or exiled. The movement was split between at least five major factions:
- Guesdists, representatives of the Marxist current in France, led by Jules Guesde and Paul Lafargue.
- Possibilists or reformists, led by Paul Brousse and Jean Allemane, were collectivists like the Guesdists, but more nuanced in their views on the accession to power and the transformation of society, which they wished to be progressive.
- Blanquists, supporters of Auguste Blanqui (still imprisoned at the time of the Marseille Congress). With their Jacobin tradition, they were the most radical on the question of revolution, advocating “total action” leading to the establishment of a new socialist system.
- Anarchists, close to the ideas of Bakunin, they define themselves as libertarian communists, following the example of Élisée Reclus. Collectivists too, they were in favor of “the disappearance of all forms of statism”.
- Cooperators, heirs to the ideas of Proudhon and Louis Blanc (who has since moved closer to the Radical Republicans), they are opposed to collectivism and violent action.

During the Marseille Congress (1879), workers' associations created the Federation of the Socialist Workers' Party of France (Fédération du parti des travailleurs socialistes de France).

The large majority of the party was collectivist, and that showed in the party program adopted in the Havre congress of 1880, written by Karl Marx, Jules Guesde and Paul Lafargue. The cooperators, opposed to this program, left the party. The failure of the Federation in the 1881 legislative election led to a growing divide between the possibilists, who had the majority, and the rest of the party. In 1882 Jules Guesde and Paul Lafargue (the son-in-law of Karl Marx) left the federation which they considered too moderate and founded the French Workers' Party (Parti ouvrier français, POF). The Federation, initially renamed the Revolutionary Socialist Labour Party (Parti ouvrier socialiste révolutionnaire), and then commonly the Federation of the Socialist Workers of France (Fédération des travailleurs socialistes de France, FTSF), led by Paul Brousse was defined as possibilist because it advocated gradual reforms whereas the POF promoted Marxism. At the same time, Édouard Vaillant and the heirs of Louis Auguste Blanqui founded the Central Revolutionary Committee (Comité révolutionnaire central, CRC), which represented the French revolutionary tradition.

== Electoralism and split ==
In the 1880s, the socialists knew their first electoral success, conquering some municipalities. Jean Allemane and some FTSF members criticized the focus on electoral goals. In 1890, they split and created the Revolutionary Socialist Workers' Party (Parti ouvrier socialiste révolutionnaire, POSR), which advocated the revolutionary general strike. Additionally, some deputies identified as socialists without being members of any party. These mostly advocated moderation and reform.

== End of the FTSF ==
While the Dreyfus Affair divided the country in the 1890s, socialist organizations debated whether to ally with other left-wing forces in defense of Alfred Dreyfus and against nationalism and clericalism. Contrary to Jean Jaurès, Jules Guesde thought the socialists should not ally with groups supporting bourgeois democracy. In 1899, a debate raged among socialist groups about the participation of Alexandre Millerand in Pierre Waldeck-Rousseau's cabinet, which included the Marquis de Gallifet, best known for having directed the bloody repression during the Paris Commune. In 1902, the FTSF, the POSR and Jaurès's followers merged into the French Socialist Party. This one merged three years later with the Socialist Party of France of Guesde in the French Section of the Workers' International.

== See also ==
- French Section of the Workers' International
- French Socialist Party
- History of communism
- History of socialism
- History of the Left in France
