= Bloc des gauches =

Alliance of French parties (1899-1906)

Lefts Bloc Bloc des gauches
- President: Ferdinand Sarrien (last)
- Founder: Pierre Waldeck-Rousseau
- Founded: 1899
- Dissolved: 1906
- Succeeded by: Lefts Cartel
- Headquarters: Paris
- Ideology: Radicalism; Socialism; Anti-clericalism; Factions: Democratic socialism Social democracy Liberal socialism Social liberalism
- Political position: Left-wing (majority)
- Colours: Red

The Lefts Bloc (French: Bloc des gauches [blɔk de ɡoʃ]) was a coalition of Republican political forces created during the French Third Republic in 1899 to contest the 1902 legislative elections. It initially supported Emile Combes's cabinet (June 1902-January 1905), then Maurice Rouvier's cabinet (January 1905-March 1906) and finally Maurice Rouvier's cabinet (March 1906-October 1906). The Republican Coalition dissolved itself after the International Socialist Congress of Amsterdam of 1904 and the subsequent withdrawal of Socialist ministers from the government. Although the Left won the 1906 legislative election, the Socialists did not repeat their alliances with the Radicals and the Radical-Socialists and other Republican forces.

== History ==
Following the Dreyfus Affair, Pierre Waldeck-Rousseau assembled a "Republican Defense Cabinet" (gouvernement de défense républicaine) in June 1899, which was supported by a parliamentary majority composed of Radicals, Radicals-Socialists and Socialists. This majority decided to ally themselves for the 1902 elections, which they won. The Bloc des gauches was thus represented in the Chamber of Deputies by four parliamentary groups: the Democratic Alliance (Alliance démocratique, AD), the Radical Left and the Radical-Socialists and the Socialists. Under Emile Combes's leadership, the new government enacted an anti-clerical policy, passing the 1905 French law on the Separation of the Churches and the State, and opposed itself to the nationalist movement.

"Opportunist Republicans" who opposed the alliance with the Radicals, the Radicals-Socialists and the Socialists, and, for some of them, the defense of the Jewish officer Alfred Dreyfus, founded in November 1903 the Republican Federation (Fédération républicaine), which represented the Republican bourgeoisie, closely connected to business circles and opposed to social reform.

Following the International Socialist Congress of Amsterdam in 1904, the Socialists were called by Jules Guesde's Socialist Party of France (Parti socialiste de France) to quit the government. The Socialist ministers thereafter withdrew themselves from the Republican Coalition, which dissolution was completed in October 1906 with the coming of Georges Clemenceau to power.

== List of leaders ==
- 1899-1902 – Pierre Waldeck-Rousseau
- 1902-1905 – Émile Combes
- 1905-1906 – Maurice Rouvier
- 1906 – Ferdinand Sarrien

== Composition ==
Party	Main ideology	Leader/s
Radical-Socialist Party	Radicalism	Émile Combes (last)
Democratic Republican Alliance	Liberalism	Marie-Adolphe Carnot
French Socialist Party	Socialism	Jean Jaurès
Independent Radicals	Social liberalism	Laurent Bonnevay

== Electoral results ==
Chamber of Deputies
Election year	# of overall votes	% of overall vote	# of overall seats won	+/–	Leader
1902	4,051,535 (#1)	47.98	314 / 589	–	Émile Combes

== See also ==
- Communism in France
- French Section of the Workers' International
- French Socialist Party
- French Workers' Party
- History of the Left in France
- Marxist philosophy
- Paris Commune
- Revolt of the Languedoc winegrowers
- Revolutionary socialism
- Socialist Party of France
- Socialist Revolutionary Party
