= Paul Aubriot =

French politician

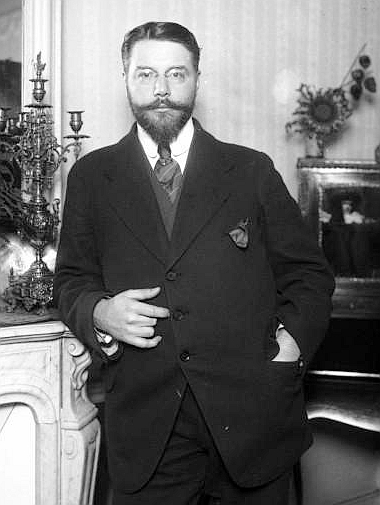
Paul Aubriot, 1913

Paul Aubriot (30 July 1873 - 16 February 1959) was a French politician.

Aubriot was born in Paris. He originally joined the Revolutionary Socialist Workers' Party (POSR), which merged into the French Socialist Party (PSF) in 1902. The PSF in turn merged into the French Section of the Workers' International (SFIO) in 1905. Aubriot represented the SFIO in the Chamber of Deputies from 1910 to 1919 and the French Socialist Party (PSF) from 1919 to 1928.
