= Lucien Herr =

French librarian (1864–1926)

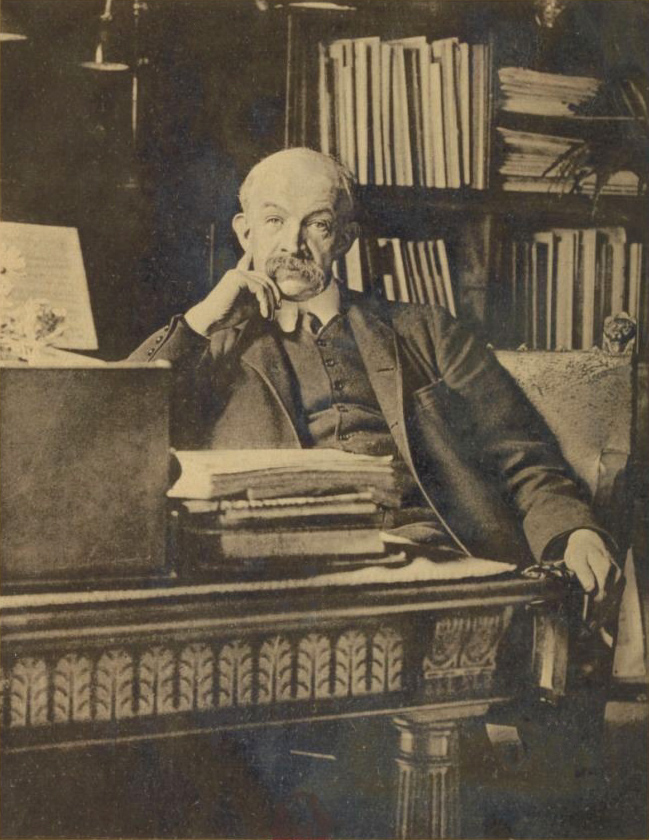
Lucien Herr.

Lucien Herr (17 January 1864 – 18 May 1926) was a French intellectual, librarian at the École Normale Supérieure in Paris, and mentor to a number of well-known socialist politicians and writers, including Jean Jaurès and Charles Péguy. He was a leading strategist in the Dreyfusard cause (seeking to overturn the wrongful conviction for treason of Captain Alfred Dreyfus).

== Life and career ==
Herr graduated from the École Normale Supérieure in 1886 with an agrégation in philosophy. He then successfully applied for a position as a librarian at the university. He retained this position from 1888 to the end of his life.

In the wake of the so-called Boulanger Crisis, Herr joined reformist socialist groups, first the Federation of the Socialist Workers of France (FTSF) in 1889 and later the Revolutionary Socialist Workers' Party (POSR). In the face of an impending overthrow, they had impressed him by their commitment to the republic, combined with the threat of a general strike. At this time, Herr is also said to have converted the initially moderately republican Jean Jaurès to socialism by showing him that socialism is the logical outcome of republican convictions.

On the occasion of the Dreyfus affair, Herr dealt with the "anti-Dreyfusard" Maurice Barrès in La Revue blanche of February 15, 1898; since his family had decided to emigrate to France after Alsace-Lorraine was annexed to the German Reich, he also claimed for himself to be "an uprooted one". Herr also brought together the intellectual "Dreyfusards" Émile Zola, Georges Clemenceau, Jean Jaurès, Bernard Lazare, Auguste Scheurer-Kestner and Charles Péguy. He organized a petition in favor of Captain Dreyfus, published in le Temps on January 15, 1898, and was one of the founders of the League for the Defense of Human and Civil Rights in 1898, of which he was a member until his death.

In 1904, he co-founded the daily newspaper l'Humanité, whose title he chose, and favored by his intense militant work within the "Socialist Unity Group" which ended in April 1905 at the Globe Congress and the creation of the French Section of the Workers' International (SFIO).

The convinced pacifist was deeply shocked by the outbreak of war in 1914. After the First World War, Herr was involved in re-establishing intellectual exchange with Germany and from 1920 he was commissioned to negotiate in Berlin about the resumption of deliveries to French libraries.

At the Tours Congress in 1920, which ended with the split of the SFIO and the creation of the French Communist Party (PCF), Herr was one of the speechwriters for Léon Blum's final declaration, expressing great sadness at the split in a movement that Herr himself had done so much to unify.

In 1916, he took over the management of the Educational Museum, the ancestor of the INRP. He remained there until his death in 1926. Herr is buried in the cemetery of Grosrouvre.

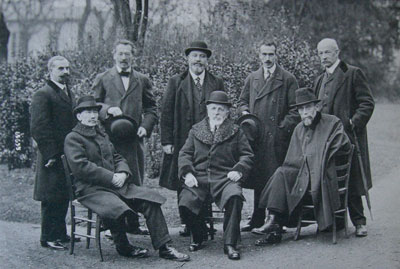
Administration of the École Normale Supérieure in Paris (1920). Lucien Herr is standing on the right.

== Influence ==
Léon Blum, the first socialist prime minister of France described Herr's intellectual impact thus: "Herr’s strength, his truly incredible and unique strength – for I have never noted it in any other to the same degree – was essentially this: in him, conviction became evidence. For him the truth was conceived with a power so complete, so tranquil that it was communicated without effort and with ease to his interlocutor. The possibility of discussion seemed to be set aside. From his entire being there emanated this assurance: 'Yes, I think this, I think that. It is absolutely impossible for an individual of a certain quality to not think or believe it.' And you would realize that you did think or believe like him." (Léon Blum, Souvenirs sur l’Affaire. Paris, Gallimard, 1981; first published 1935).
