= Henri Barabant =

French politician

Henri Barabant (9 November 1874, Vougeot - 11 September 1951) was a French politician. He joined at first the Revolutionary Socialist Workers' Party (POSR), which in 1902 merged into the French Socialist Party (PSF), which in turn merged into the French Section of the Workers' International (SFIO) in 1905. From 1914 to 1919 Barabant represented the SFIO in the Chamber of Deputies. In 1919 he was not reelected. He belonged to the French Communist Party (PCF) from 1920 to 1922, after which he joined the Socialist-Communist Union (USC), which he represented in the Chamber of Deputies from 1924 to 1928. Thereafter he returned to the SFIO.

== Biography ==
Born in 1874 in Vougeot, Henri Barabant was the son of Jacques Barabant, a winegrower and gardener-manager at the Château de Vougeot. Upon his father's death, he joined the Chemins de fer de Paris à Lyon et à la Méditerranée as an employee, but was quickly dismissed for his union and political activities: in 1892, he joined the railway union and in 1897, the Socialist Party.

In 1897, he became secretary of the socialist group in Dijon, then of the socialist workers' federation of Côte-d'Or in 1898, which joined the Revolutionary Socialist Workers' Party (France)(POSR). He represented Côte-d'Or at the Lyon congress. Then, in 1901, he reorganized the POSR to integrate it into the French Socialist Party (1902).
