= Independent Socialists (France) =

French political movement

The Independent Socialists (French: Socialistes indépendants, SI) were a French political movement and, at times, parliamentary group in the Chamber of Deputies of France during the French Third Republic. The movement was strong from 1880 until the fall of the Republic in 1940.

At first, the Independent Socialists were a diverse set of socialists who refused to affiliate with an organized party. Before the creation of the French Section of the Workers' International (SFIO) in 1905, French socialism was divided between the French Socialist Party (PSF), the Socialist Party of France (PSdF) and the French Workers' Party (POF). Later, the name was applied to parliamentarians and local politicians who believed they held their legitimacy from voters and thus refused to follow the instructions of party leaders. The SFIO, the main socialist party, had a strong party organization, something relatively unique in the Third Republic. In the end, following the creation of the SFIO, the name was used to refer to those who did not wish to join the SFIO. A number of those people later joined the Republican-Socialist Party (PRS).

Some socialists refused to join SFIO in 1905 for varied reasons rather than one shared ideology: resistance to Jules Guesde's revolutionary Marxist dominance, disagreement with the party's opposition to ministerial participation and its antimilitarism, and objections to its strict internal discipline and limits on elected representatives' independence. The independent socialists who stayed out thus remained a heterogenous group, mixing moderate reformists with figures closer to the revolutionary tradition. Though their membership was small, the roughly 24 independent socialist deputies who remained outside the SFIO after unification constituted a significant parliamentary force.

== See also ==
- History of the Left in France
