= Central Revolutionary Committee =

Central Revolutionary Committee Comité révolutionnaire central
- Abbreviation: CRC
- Founders: Édouard Vaillant; Ernest Granger; Émile Eudes
- Founded: June 1881; 144 years ago
- Dissolved: 1898; 128 years ago
- Split from: Federation of the Socialist Workers of France
- Merged into: Socialist Revolutionary Party
- Ideology: Blanquism; Socialism
- Political position: Left-wing to Far-left
- Colours: Red

The Central Revolutionary Committee (French: Comité révolutionnaire central, CRC) was a French Blanquist political party founded in 1881 and dissolved in 1898.

The CRC was founded by Édouard Vaillant to continue the political struggle of Auguste Blanqui (1805–1881). It was weakened by a split in 1888, when numerous members including Henri Rochefort followed General Georges Ernest Boulanger who synthesized Jacobin nationalism with socialism and many saw Boulangism as a possible way to socialism. Following the Boulangist dissidence, Vaillant re-centered the party around the idea of syndicalism and strike. The CRC was further reinforced in 1896 by the affiliation of the Revolutionary Communist Alliance (ACR), formed by dissidents of the Revolutionary Socialist Workers' Party (POSR).

The CRC was dissolved into the Socialist Revolutionary Party in 1898.

== Notable members ==
- Édouard Vaillant

== See also ==
- History of the Left in France
- Socialist Revolutionary Party
