= Natalia Landsberg =

Russian anarchist activist (1846–1910)

- Наталья Ландсберг
- Born: Natalia Iosifovna Landsberg; 1846; Chișinău, Bessarabia Governorate, Russian Empire
- Died: 10 July 1910 (aged 63–64); Paris, France
- Organisation: Jura Federation
- Movement: Anarchism, socialism
- Spouse: Paul Brousse (m. 1886; sep. 1894)
- Children: 1
- Parents: Joseph Mikhailovich Landsberg (father); Zinovia Gregorievna Landsberg (mother)

Natalia Iosifovna Landsberg (Note: Also known by the French: Natalie Landsberg.) (Russian: Наталья Иосифовна Ландсберг; 1846–1910) was a Russian anarchist activist. Born into an aristocratic family in Bessarabia, Landsberg grew up to become a socialist and left behind her life to emigrate to Switzerland. There she met Paul Brousse, whom she radicalised towards more extreme anarchist positions. During her time in Switzerland, she financed several anarchist and socialist publications, in both the German and French languages. After Brousse was expelled from the country, she followed him to Belgium, England and finally France. There they were married, but she separated from him after he had an affair with a young woman.

== Biography ==
Natalia Landsberg was born in the Bessarabian capital of Chișinău, in 1846, to the Russian police prefect Joseph Mikhailovich Landsberg and his wife Zinovia Gregorievna Landsberg. Inspired by the growing Narodnik movement, disgusted by the pervasive antisemitism in Bessarabia and tired of her aristocratic family, in 1866, Landsberg decided to leave the Russian Empire by entering into a marriage of convenience. She went on to live an ascetic life according to her socialist principles. She moved to Switzerland and settled in a colony of Russian emigrés in Zurich. She later went to study at the University of Bern. By the 1870s, she had become an anarchist.

In 1873–1874, Landsberg met the French anarchist Paul Brousse and began a relationship with him. She introduced Brousse to other activists in the Russian emigré movement, and influenced him to adopt more extremist positions on anarchism. In March 1876, Brousse, Landsberg and several other Russian activists established the German-speaking Social Democratic Association (German: Socialdemokratischer Verein). After a political demonstration in commemoration of the Paris Commune, it began to more closely cooperated with the city's French-speaking groups and later joined the Jura Federation. Landsberg provided the funding for the group's newspaper, Arbeiter-Zeitung, which began publication in July 1876. According to Rudolf Rocker, it would be the first anarchist publication in the German language.

In December 1876, Landsberg also began publication of the French socialist publication Almanach de la Commune, which she printed in Geneva and smuggled into France for distribution. In August 1877, Brousse and Landsberg respectively organised and financed a secret congress of the French Federation of the Anti-Authoritarian International. Following a brief prison sentence in the Käfigturm in October 1877, Brousse fell seriously ill. Landsberg took him to the home of Jean-Louis Pindy in La Chaux-de-Fonds, where she nursed him back to health over the course of six weeks. The following year, when Brousse's French newspaper L'Avante Garde ran into financial difficulties, Landsberg helped pay for its continued publication. In the newspaper, Landsberg published a translation of an appeal by 24 of the condemned defendants of the Trial of the 193, as well as the cover letter they had sent to Pavel Axelrod's newspaper Obshchina.

In December 1878, the Swiss government shut down L'Avante Garde, due to its revolutionary proclamations, and imprisoned Brousse in solitary confinement. Landsberg was one of the only people allowed to visit him, on the condition that they only discuss trivial matters such as the weather. During his imprisonment, Lansberg stayed with Gustave Jeanneret's family in Neuchâtel. Brousse was deported the following year, and on 27 June 1879, Landsberg joined him in Brussels. Although Landsberg had hoped they could avoid expulsion by not attending political meetings, the couple were deported by royal decree only seven weeks later. They moved to London, where they spent the rest of the year; Brousse did not want to return to France until an amnesty was proclaimed for socialist activists. In 1880, Landsberg gave birth to their daughter, Clotilde Léonie Jeanne Brousse.

By the time Brousse returned to France, he had moved away from anarchism towards reformist socialism. In a letter to Fritz Brupbacher, the Swiss anarchist James Guillaume blamed Landsberg for Brousse's political conversion. Brousse's biographer David A. T. Stafford expressed doubts about Guillaume's explanation, stressing that Landsberg had herself been partly responsible for Brousse's radicalisation to anarchism; Stafford says that it was more likely that Brousse's later turn had actually influenced her towards moderate politics. In January 1886, Landsberg and Brousse got married, but their marriage would only last eight years. In 1894, Landsberg discovered that her husband was having an affair with a young women named Julie Aveline. She left him, but refused to divorce him and continued to see him regularly. On 10 July 1910, Landsberg died in Paris; Brousse married Aveline soon after.

== Bibliography ==
- Avrich, Paul (1988). "Paul Brousse: The Possibilist Anarchist". Anarchist Portraits. Princeton: Princeton University Press. pp. 240–246. ISBN 978-0-691-04753-9. OCLC 17727270.
- Stafford, David (1972). "Paul Brousse". International Review of Social History. 17 (1): 381–386. doi:10.1017/s0020859000006581. ISSN 0020-8590.
- Stafford, David (1971). From anarchism to reformism: a study of the political activities of Paul Brousse 1870-90. University of Toronto Press. ISBN 9780802017390.
- Vuilleumier, Marc (2012). "Benoît Malon, Herzen et les premiers socialistes russes". Revue des Études Slaves (in French). 83 (1): 139–61. doi:10.3406/slave.2012.8174. JSTOR 43272559.
