= 1902 French legislative election =

- 27 April and 11 May 1902

All 589 seats the Chamber of Deputies 295 seats needed for a majority
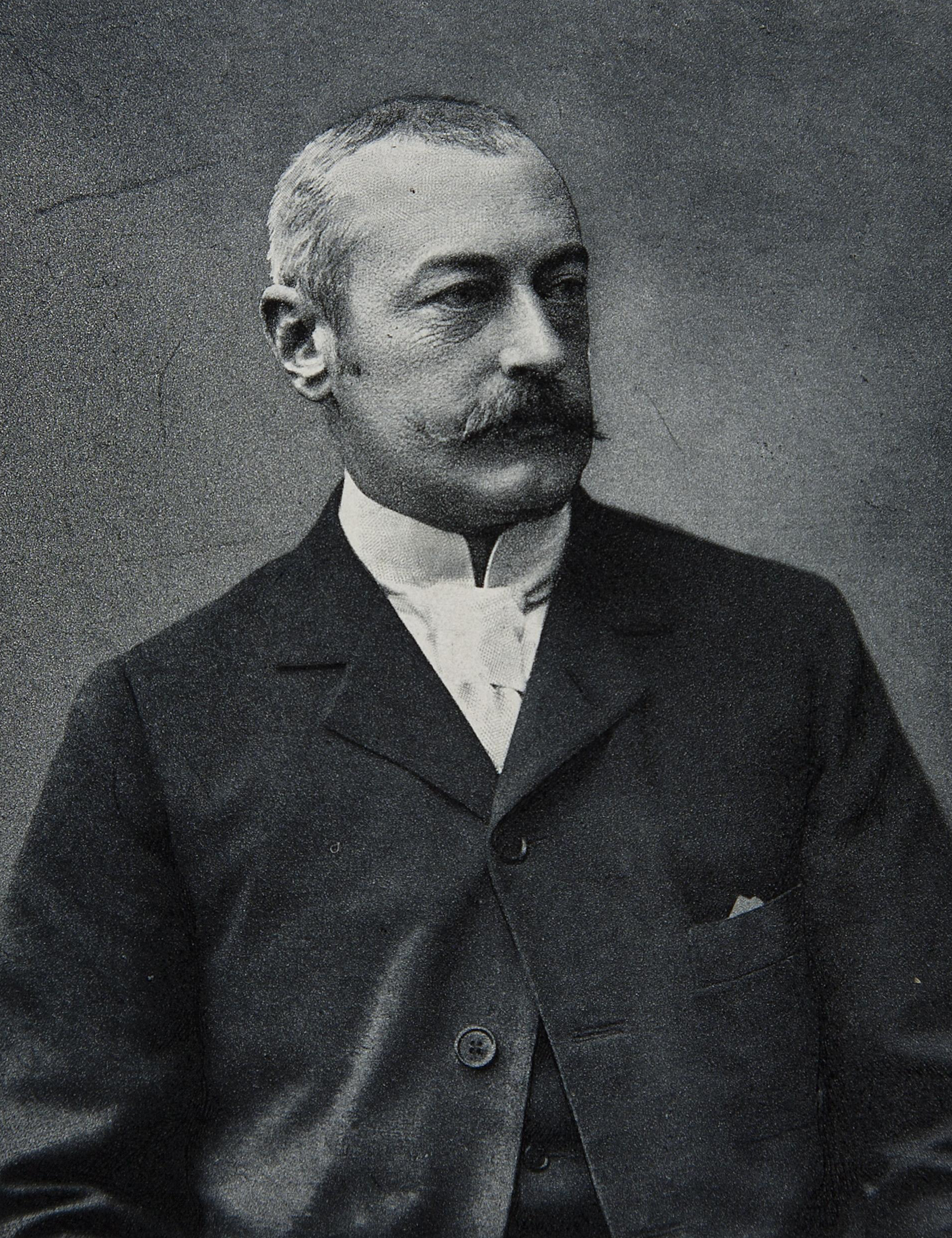

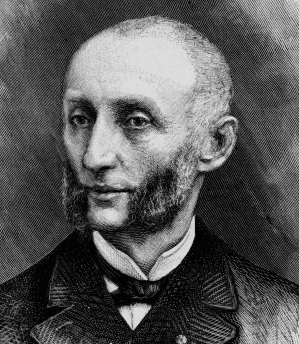

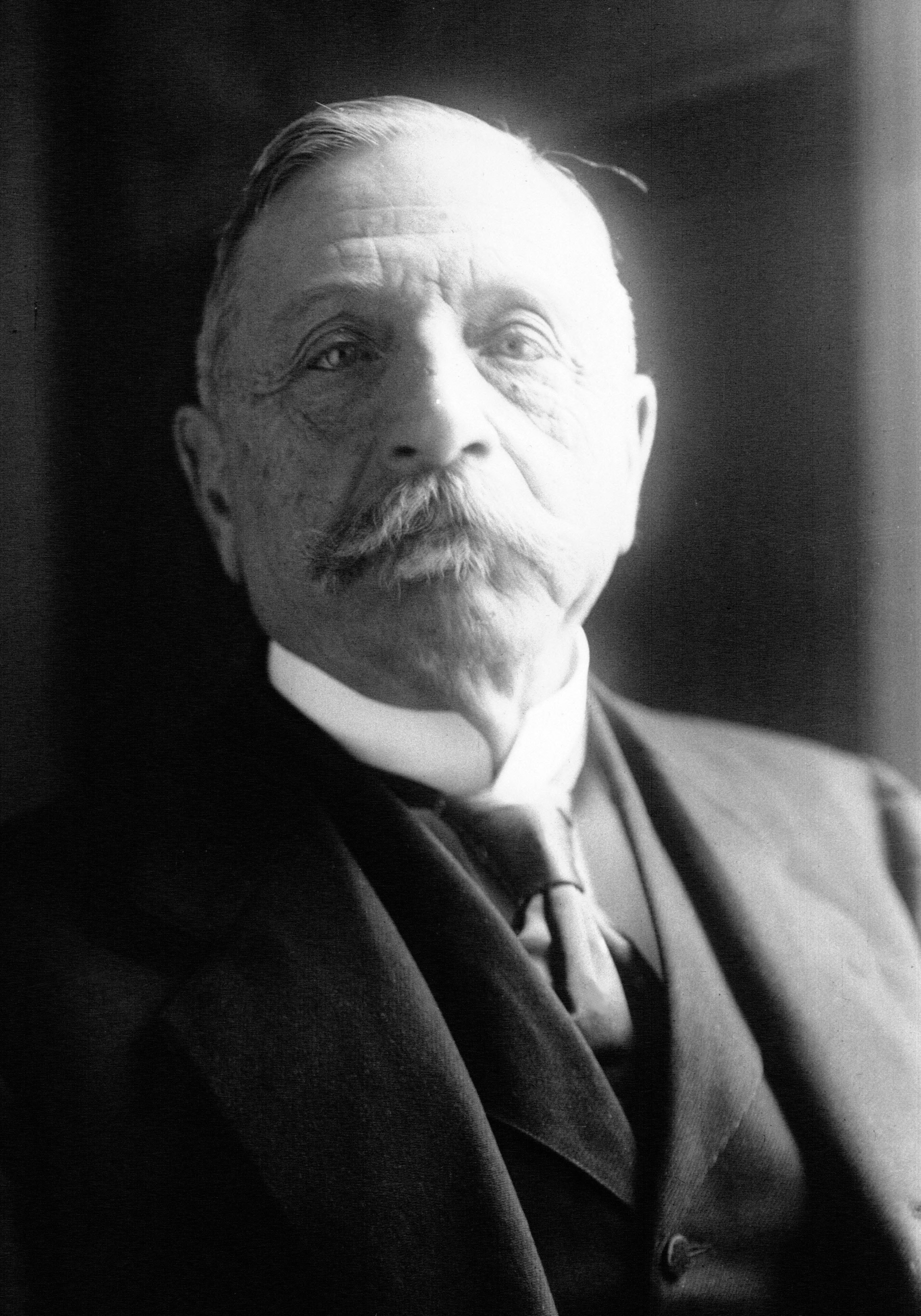
Leader	Pierre Waldeck-Rousseau	Jules Méline	Jacques Piou (lost election)
Alliance	Left Bloc Parties: Democratic Republican Alliance; Radical-Socialists; Independent Radicals; Socialists	Progressives Republicans	Conservatives Parties: Liberal Action; Nationalists; Reactionaries
Seats won	338	127	124
Prime Minister before election
Pierre Waldeck-Rousseau
ARD
Elected Prime Minister
Émile Combes
Radicals

Legislative elections were held in France on 27 April and 11 May 1902. The result was a victory for the Bloc des gauches alliance between Socialists, Radicals, and the Democratic Republican Alliance, over the anti-Dreyfusard right wing of the Republicans, the progressistes. The Bloc des gauches had been brought together to support the "Republican Defense Cabinet" (gouvernement de défense républicaine) formed by Pierre Waldeck-Rousseau following the assault on the newly elected president, Émile Loubet, on the Longchamp Racecourse on 4 June 1899, during the Dreyfus affair.

However, Waldeck-Rousseau's own supporters (the ARD) took few seats in the election compared to the Radicals and Socialists. After the election, President Loubet invited the Radical Émile Combes to form a government, which lasted until January 1905, when the Socialists withdrew from the Bloc des gauches.

== Results ==
Party	Votes	%	Seats
Progressive Republicans	2,501,429	29.73	127
Democratic Republican Alliance	2,501,429	29.73	62
Independent Radicals	1,413,931	16.81	129
Nationalists	1,194,900	14.20	89
Reactionaries	1,188,180	14.12	89
Socialists	531,087	6.31	43
Revolutionary Socialists	344,445	4.09	43
Radical-Socialists	853,140	10.14	104
Popular Liberal Action	385,615	4.58	35
Total	8,412,727	100.00	589
Registered voters/turnout	11,058,702	–	
Source: France-Politique, Rois et Presidents
