= Pierre Mélin =

French politician

Pierre Mélin (7 November 1863 in Essonnes – 23 November 1929 in Paris XIVe) was a French politician. At first he joined the French Workers' Party (POF), which in 1902 merged into the Socialist Party of France (PSdF), which in turn merged into the French Section of the Workers' International (SFIO) in 1905. He was a member of the Chamber of Deputies from 1906 to 1910 and from 1914 to 1919.
