= Paul Brousse =

French socialist politician (1844–1912)

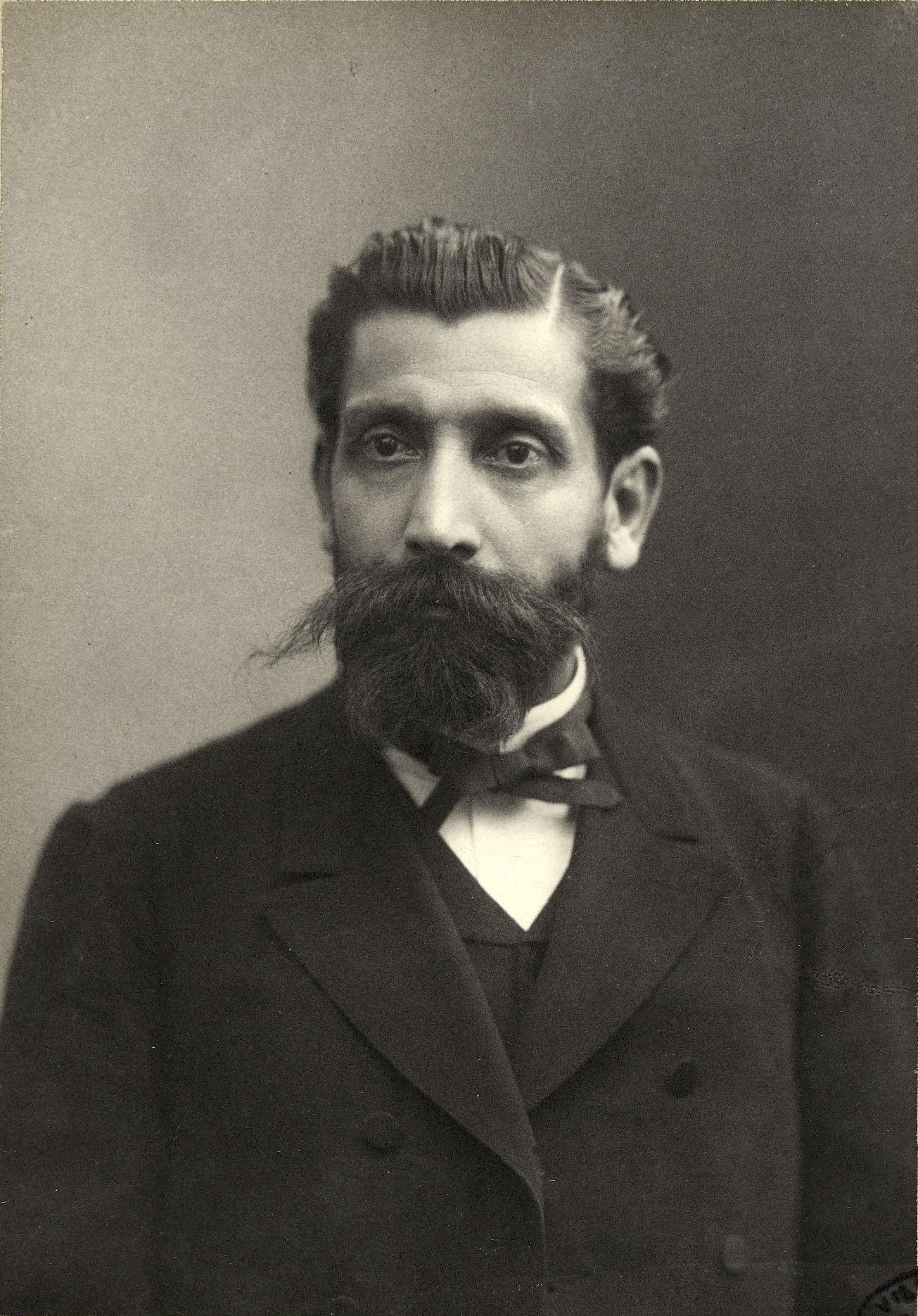
- Brousse, c. 1890

Member of the Chamber of Deputies
- In office 1 June 1906 – 31 May 1910
- President: Armand Fallières
- Prime Minister: Ferdinand Sarrien (1906); Georges Clemenceau (1906–1909); Aristide Briand (1909–1911)
- Preceded by: Ernest Roche
- Succeeded by: Ernest Roche
- Parliamentary group: Socialists
- Constituency: Seine

President of the Municipal Council of Paris
- In office 20 March 1905 – 12 March 1906
- Preceded by: Georges Desplas
- Succeeded by: Paul Chautard

Councillor of Paris
- In office 15 May 1887 – 18 April 1907

Personal details
- Born: Paul Louis Marie Brousse; 23 January 1844 Montpellier, Occitania, France
- Died: 1 April 1912 (aged 68) Paris, France
- Party: French Section of the Workers' International (1905–1912); French Socialist Party (1902–1905); Federation of the Socialist Workers of France (1879–1902)
- Other political affiliations: Socialist International (1889–1912); Anti-Authoritarian International (1873–1877); International Workingmen's Association (1871–1872)
- Spouses: Natalia Landsberg (m. 1886; sep. 1894); Julie Aveline (m. 1910–1912)
- Education: University of Montpellier
- Occupation: Physician, politician

Paul Louis Marie Brousse (French: [bʁus]; 1844–1912) was a French socialist politician. After training as a physician, he was radicalised by the events of the Paris Commune and joined the anarchist faction of the International Workingmen's Association (IWMA). After being expelled from the IWMA over his opposition to Marxism, he fled to Spain and participated in an attempted revolution in Barcelona. He then went to Switzerland and joined the Jura Federation of the Anti-Authoritarian International, in which he focused much of his time publishing propaganda for German speakers. He developed the theory of propaganda by the deed, became an early advocate of anarchist communism and proposed workers seize power in local governments.

After being expelled from Switzerland over his revolutionary political writings, he returned to France and became a leader of the possibilist movement, which advocated for social reform through municipal socialism. As the leader of the Federation of the Socialist Workers of France (FTSF), he was elected to the Municipal Council of Paris and participated in the founding of the Socialist International. But he soon began to lose influence in the French socialist movement, culminating in a split in the FTSF after he expelled Jean Allemane from the party. He then gave way to a new generation of French socialists, led by Alexandre Millerand.

== Biography ==
=== Early life and education ===
Paul Brousse was born on 23 January 1844, in the Occitan city of Montpellier. The son of a middle class physician, Brousse followed in his father's footsteps and enrolled to study medicine at the University of Montpellier. He worked as a medical intern during the 1863–1875 cholera pandemic, and after graduating from university, he started his own medical practice.

=== Activism in the Communard movement ===
By the 1870s, Brousse had entered into radical politics and began writing for Jules Guesde's newspaper Les Droits de l’Homme. The events of the Paris Commune inspired him to join the nascent his local branch of the International Workingmen's Association (IWMA), which at the time was proscribed by the French government. He took the side of the anarchist faction and vocally criticised the centralisation of power over the IWMA by Karl Marx, for which he was expelled from his own Montpellier branch before the Hague Congress of September 1872. Following the collapse of the IWMA in France, he fled to Spain. There, together with the Corsican anarchist Charles Alerini and the Lyonnaise communard Camille Camet, Brousse established an exiled French section of the IWMA and edited its journal La Solidarité Révolutionnaire. Inspired by the communal revolts in France, Brousse used the paper to develop his vision of revolutionary communes being established throughout Europe. On 20 June 1873, Brousse took part in an attempted revolution by the IWMA in Barcelona, where he participated in the seizure of the city hall. It was followed by a general strike, but the revolt collapsed after the government implemented conscription; its failure made Brousse into an ardent opponent of the use of a general strike as a means to make revolution.

=== Anarchist activism in Switzerland ===
Fearing the rise of militarism that followed in the wake of the Cantonal Rebellion, Brousse fled to Switzerland. There, in September 1873, he participated in the Geneva Congress of the Anti-Authoritarian International, before settling in Bern and joining the International's Jura Federation. He organised the Federation's French section and sought to appeal to German-speaking Swiss workers. He began publishing a German language supplement of the organisation's Bulletin in 1874, formed a German language study group in January 1875 and issued one of the first German anarchist programmes in October 1875. During this time, he met a Russian émigré called Natalia Landsberg, who became his life-long companion. With funding from Landsberg, in July 1876, he began publication of the German anarchist newspaper Arbeiter-Zeitung. The paper was edited together with the German anarchists August Reinsdorf, Otto Rinke and Emil Werner, the latter of whom translated Brousse's articles into German. It was distributed throughout Switzerland and also smuggled into Germany.

Following the death of Mikhail Bakunin in 1876, Brousse began to develop a new theory called "propaganda by the deed", which involved using collective forms of direct action to incite revolution. This position propelled Brousse to a leading position in the International, challenging the moderate syndicalism proposed by James Guillaume. Having outlined his theory in Arbeiter-Zeitung, Brousse attempted to put it into practice with a political demonstration to commemorate the sixth anniversary of the Paris Commune. On 18 March 1877, Brousse led the procession with a red flag through the streets of Bern, reaching the tomb of Bakunin before it was broken up by police. He was imprisoned for a short time for his role in the demonstration. By this time, Brousse had also become an early exponent of anarchist communism, which called for a free association to distribute resources according to individual needs. Together with the Italian Andrea Costa, he began to advocate for it within the Anti-Authoritarian International, notably winning over the Russian anarchist Peter Kropotkin. Brousse also developed a localist strategy, arguing for the working class to take political control of local governments and use them to establish socialism. By establishing communal autonomy, they could demonstrate their ideas for a post-capitalist society in practice, with the goal of overthrowing the state in a social revolution.

=== Possibilist politics in France ===
With the Jura Federation experiencing a decline, in 1877, Brousse turned his attention back towards France. He and Kropotkin established the French militant anarchist journal L'Avant-Garde, which he distributed illegally in France. In April 1879, the Swiss government shut down the publication over its advocacy of propaganda by the deed, and arrested and imprisoned Brousse. After Brousse was expelled from Switzerland in June 1879, he travelled to Brussels, then went on to London, before finally returning to France in July 1880. Upon his return, he moved away from his revolutionary anarchist beliefs and began to advocate for pragmatic form and municipal socialism; instead of using the commune as a vehicle for social revolution, he now sought to use it as a model for social reform. In 1883, he wrote that "our aims should be immediatised so as to render them possible"; this formed the namesake for his philosophy of possibilism, which became a driving force in the Federation of the Socialist Workers of France (FTSF).

Unlike other former anarchists who had joined the political socialist movement, such as Jules Guesde and Georgi Plekhanov, Brousse did not convert to Marxism and remained an adherent of anti-authoritarianism. He criticised Marxism on tactical grounds, attributing the collapse of the IWMA to Marxist centralisation. He expelled Jules Guesde and Paul Lafargue from the FTSF over their allegiance to Marx, who he called "the Pope in London". Friedrich Engels reported that Brousse had "remov[ed] the anarchy from anarchism but retain[ed] all the other phrases and tactics". As attempts began to be made to create a successor organisation to the IWMA, Brousse sought to establish the FTSF as the legitimate socialist party in France, with the intention of preventing the nascent International from turning towards Marxism. Brousse went on to participate in the founding of the Socialist International (SI) in 1889.

=== Declining influence ===
Over the course of the 1880s, a rivalry between him and Jean Allemane had come to dominate the FTSF, with Allemane using his credentials as a Communard to discredit Brousse's leadership. When the right-wing won ground in the 1885 French legislative election, the position of the FTSF was weakened, and Brousse began to talk of "defend[ing] the Republic" from reactionary forces. In the 1887 Paris municipal election, Brousse and 6 other socialists were elected to the municipal council, causing tension with the party's rank-and-file. The situation was exacerbated after Brousse joined with the Radicals to found the Society of the Rights of Man and of the Citizen, intended to defend the Republic from the rise of the Georges Ernest Boulanger's League of Patriots. Rising pressure from the rank-and-file culminated in May 1890, when Allemane assumed the leadership of the dissidents and established a rival newspaper to Brousse's Le Prolétariat. The deaths of Brousse's most prominent supporters, Jules Joffrin and Edme Charles Chabert, put him in a weaker position and he soon lost control of the party's Parisian section. In a last desperate move, Brousse expelled Allemane from the party at its national congress in Châtellerault, driving out many of its most active members and precipitating an irreversible decline in the party's popularity.

Brousse subsequently lost much of his remaining influence over the French socialist movement. He nevertheless remained active, organising socialists during the Dreyfus affair and supporting the merger of the various socialist political parties into a unified French Socialist Party. He then gave way to a new generation of socialist leaders, including Jean Jaurès and Alexandre Millerand. In 1899, he approved Millerand's entry into the government of Pierre Waldeck-Rousseau, marking the first time a socialist had joined a government during the Third Republic.

=== Final years ===
Brousse refocused his own political efforts on local government and was elected President of the Municipal Council of Paris in 1905. From this capacity, he played host to the Spanish King Alfonso XIII, which provoked harsh criticism from his former colleagues in the anarchist movement. The following year, he was elected to the Chamber of Deputies on the list of the French Section of the Workers' International, of which he was a member of the right-wing faction. After losing his seat in parliament in the 1910 French legislative election, he was appointed as director of a psychiatric hospital in Ville-Évrard. He died in 1912.

== Bibliography ==
- Avrich, Paul (1988). "Paul Brousse: The Possibilist Anarchist". Anarchist Portraits. Princeton: Princeton University Press. pp. 240–246. ISBN 978-0-691-04753-9. OCLC 17727270.
- Stafford, David (1972). "Paul Brousse". International Review of Social History. 17 (1): 381–386. doi:10.1017/s0020859000006581. ISSN 0020-8590.
