= Sauveterre-de-Comminges =

- Commune
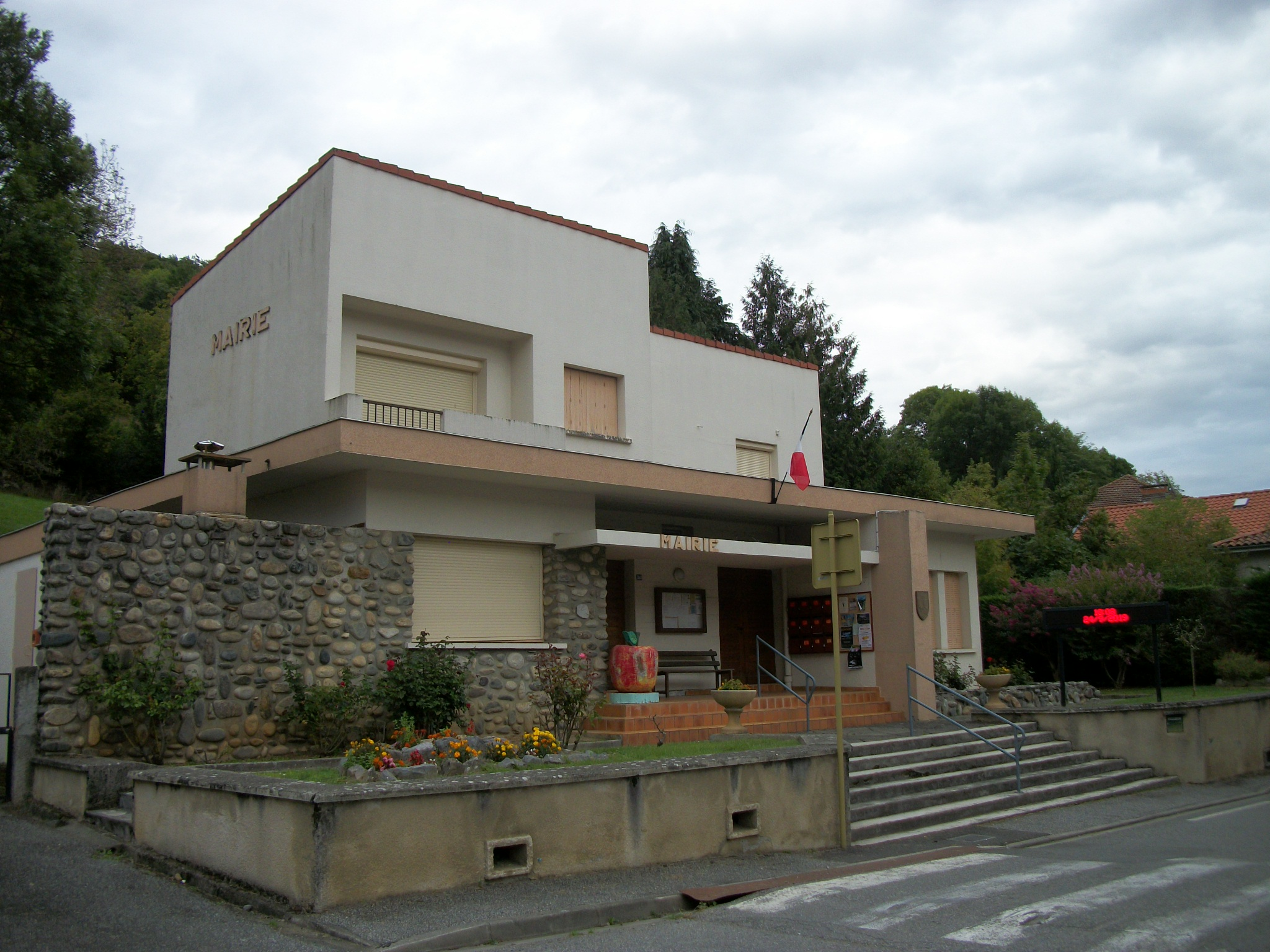
- The town hall in Sauveterre-de-Comminges

- Coat of arms
- Location of Sauveterre-de-Comminges
- Location within France Location within Occitanie
- Coordinates: 43°02′03″N 0°40′07″E
- Country: France
- Region: Occitania
- Department: Haute-Garonne
- Arrondissement: Saint-Gaudens
- Canton: Bagnères-de-Luchon

Government
  - Mayor (2020–2026): Philippe Prat
- Area^{1}: 30.52 km^{2} (11.78 sq mi)
- Elevation: 460 m (1,510 ft)
- Highest elevation: 1,031 m (3,383 ft)
- Lowest elevation: 407 m (1,335 ft)
- Population (2023): 702
  - Density: 23.0/km^{2} (59.6/sq mi)
- Time zone: UTC+01:00 (CET)
  - Summer (DST): UTC+02:00 (CEST)
- INSEE/Postal code: 31535 /31510
- ^{1} French Land Register data, which excludes lakes, ponds, glaciers > 1 km^{2} (0.386 sq mi or 247 acres) and river estuaries.

Sauveterre-de-Comminges (French pronunciation: [sovtɛʁ də kɔmɛ̃ʒ], literally Sauveterre of Comminges; Occitan: Sauvatèrra de Comenge) is a commune in the Haute-Garonne department in southwestern France.

== Population ==
Historical population
Year	Pop.	±% p.a.
1968	745	—
1975	771	+0.49%
1982	654	−2.32%
1990	730	+1.38%
1999	720	−0.15%
2007	722	+0.03%
2012	726	+0.11%
2017	634	−2.67%
2023	702	+1.71%
Source: INSEE

== See also ==
- Communes of the Haute-Garonne department
