= French Workers' Party =

French evolutionary Marxist party (1880–1902)

French Workers' Party Parti ouvrier français
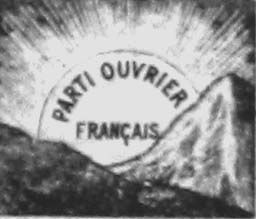
- Founders: Jules Guesde; Paul Lafargue
- Founded: 1880; 146 years ago
- Dissolved: 1902; 124 years ago
- Split from: Federation of the Socialist Workers of France
- Merged into: Socialist Party of France
- Ideology: Socialism; Marxism
- Political position: Left-wing
- Colours: Red

The French Workers' Party (French: Parti ouvrier français, POF) was the French socialist party created in 1880 by Jules Guesde and Paul Lafargue, Karl Marx's son-in-law (famous for having written The Right to Be Lazy, which criticized work as such, criticizing heavily liberal moral frameworks of "Right to Work"). A revolutionary party, it aimed to abolish capitalism and replace it with a communist society.

The party originated with a secession from Federation of the Socialist Workers' Party of France, which was founded in 1879, after a split with Paul Brousse's possibilists. The party's programme, written by Guesde with input from Marx, Lafargue and Friedrich Engels, was approved at the opening congress. The party officially became the POF in 1893.

In 1902, the party merged with the Blanquist Central Revolutionary Committee to form the Socialist Party of France and finally merged in 1905 with Jean Jaurès' French Socialist Party to form the French Section of the Workers' International (SFIO). Marcel Cachin, who would lead the split in 1920 which led to the creation of the French Communist Party and edited L'Humanité newspaper, became a member of the POF in 1891.

The Nord, Pas-de-Calais, Loire and Allier were the principal bastions of POF electoral strength.

== Principal members ==
- Jules Guesde (1845–1922), founding member and elected deputy
- Paul Lafargue (1842–1911), son-in-law of Karl Marx and elected deputy
- Marcel Cachin (1869–1958), member from 1891, led the SFIO Tours split in 1920, future director of L'Humanité
- Alexandre Bracke-Desrousseaux (1861–1955), professor (Greek Philosophy) and future elected deputy for the SFIO
- Alexandre Zévaès (1873–1953), elected deputy Isère (1898–1910)
- Bernard Cadenat (1853–1930), shoemaker, elected deputy Bouches-du-Rhône (1898–1919 and 1924–1930) and mayor of Marseille (1910–1912)
- Ulysse Pastre (1864–1930), researcher and elected deputy Gard (1898–1910)
- Jean-Baptiste Bénézech (1852–1909), printer, elected deputy Hérault (1898–1909) and president of the typography workers union
- René Chauvin (1860–1936), barber, elected deputy Seine (1893–1898) and founder of the coiffeurs workers union who quit the SFIO in 1914 to found a small workers party promoing a return to class war
- Hubert Lagardelle (1875–1958), revolutionary syndicalist, Minister of Labor, Vichy France, 1942-1943.
- Prosper Ferrero, elected deputy for Marseille in 1898–1910, mayor of Toulon (1893) and vice president of the General Council (1914–1915)
- Jean Bertrand, elected deputy for Corbeil
- Pierre Mélin (1863–1929) luthier, vice president of the Valenciennes's Labour Court and elected deputy
- Georges Vacher de Lapouge (1854–1936), antisemitic anthropologist and eugenist, Attorney of the Republic and professor

== See also ==
- France in the nineteenth century
- French Third Republic
- History of the Left in France
- Marxism
- Socialism
- Yellow socialism

== Bibliography ==
=== French ===
- C. Willard C. (1965). Le Mouvement socialiste en France, 1893-1905. Les guesdistes. Ed. sociales.
- J. Verlhac (1997). La formation de l’unité socialiste (1898-1905). L'Harmattan. Reissue of a memoir published in 1947
