= David A. T. Stafford =

British historian (born 1942)

- Born: David Alexander Tetlow Stafford; 10 March 1942 (age 84)

Academic background
- Education: Downing College, Cambridge; University of London

Academic work
- Discipline: Military history
- Sub-discipline: Second World War
- Institutions: University of Edinburgh; London School of Economics

David Alexander Tetlow Stafford (born 10 March 1942) was projects director at Edinburgh University's Centre for the Study of the Two World Wars and is Leverhulme Emeritus Professor in the university's School of History, Classics and Archaeology.

Stafford took his B.A. at Downing College, Cambridge, in 1963. He then undertook postgraduate study at the University of London, taking an M.A. and finally his Ph.D. in history in 1968.

Beginning his career with government service, Stafford served in the British Diplomatic Service as a third secretary at the Foreign Office from 1967 to 1968, and then as second secretary in 1968. He then took up an appointment as research associate (1968–70) at the Centre of International Studies at the London School of Economics and Political Science. He then became assistant professor of history (1970–76) at Canada's University of Victoria in British Columbia. He was promoted to associate professor of history (1976–82) and finally professor of history (1982–84). He then became director of studies (1985–86) and executive director (1986–92) at the Canadian Institute of International Affairs in Toronto, Ontario, Canada. From 1992 to 2000 Stafford became a visiting professor at Edinburgh University's Institute for Advanced Studies in the Humanities, and then, from 2000, he became projects director at the Centre for the Study of the Two World Wars.

Stafford is particularly noted for his scholarly works concerning Winston Churchill and British intelligence, various aspects of the Second World War, and twentieth-century intelligence and espionage with a focus on Britain. He now resides in Victoria, British Columbia, Canada.

== Published works ==
- From Anarchism to Reformism: A Study of the Political Activities of Paul Brousse, 1870-90, University of Toronto Press (Toronto, Ontario, Canada), 1971.
- Britain and European Resistance, 1940-1945: A Survey of the Special Operations Executive, with Documents, University of Toronto Press (Toronto, Ontario, Canada), 1980.
- Camp X: Canada's School for Secret Agents, 1941-1945, Lester & Orpen Dennys (Toronto, Ontario, Canada), 1986; Dodd Mead (New York, NY), 1987.
- The Silent Game: The Real World of Imaginary Spies, Lester & Orpen Dennys (Toronto, Ontario, Canada), 1988; revised edition, University of Georgia Press (Athens, GA), 1991.
- (With J.L. Granatstein) Spy Wars: Espionage and Canada: From Gouzenko to Glasnost, Key Porter Books (Toronto, Ontario, Canada), 1990.
- (Editor, with A. Stuart Farson and Wesley K. Wark) Security and Intelligence in a Changing World: New Perspectives for the 1990s, Frank Cass (Portland, OR), 1991.
- Churchill and Secret Service, John Murray (London, England), 1997; Overlook Press (Woodstock, NY), 1998.
- Roosevelt and Churchill: Men of Secrets, Little, Brown (London, England), 1999; Overlook Press (Woodstock, NY), 2000.
- (Editor, with Rhodri Jeffreys-Jones) American-British-Canadian Intelligence Relations, 1939-2000 (case studies), Frank Cass (Portland, OR), 2000.
- Secret Agent: The True Story of the Special Operations Executive, BBC Worldwide (London, England), 2000; published as Secret Agent: The True Story of the Covert War against Hitler, Overlook Press (Woodstock, NY), 2001.
- (Editor) Flight from Reality: Rudolf Hess and His Mission to Scotland, 1941, Pimlico (London, England), 2002.
- Spies beneath Berlin, John Murray (London, England), 2002; Overlook Press (Woodstock, NY), 2003.
- Ten Days to D-Day: Countdown to the Liberation of Europe, Little, Brown (London, England), 2003; published as Countdown to D-Day: Citizens and Soldiers on the Eve of the Invasion, Little, Brown (New York, NY), 2004.
- Endgame, 1945: Victory, Retribution, Liberation, Little, Brown (London, England), 2007; published as Endgame, 1945: The Missing Final Chapter of World War II, Little, Brown (New York, NY), 2007.
