= Jean Jaurès =

French socialist leader (1859–1914)

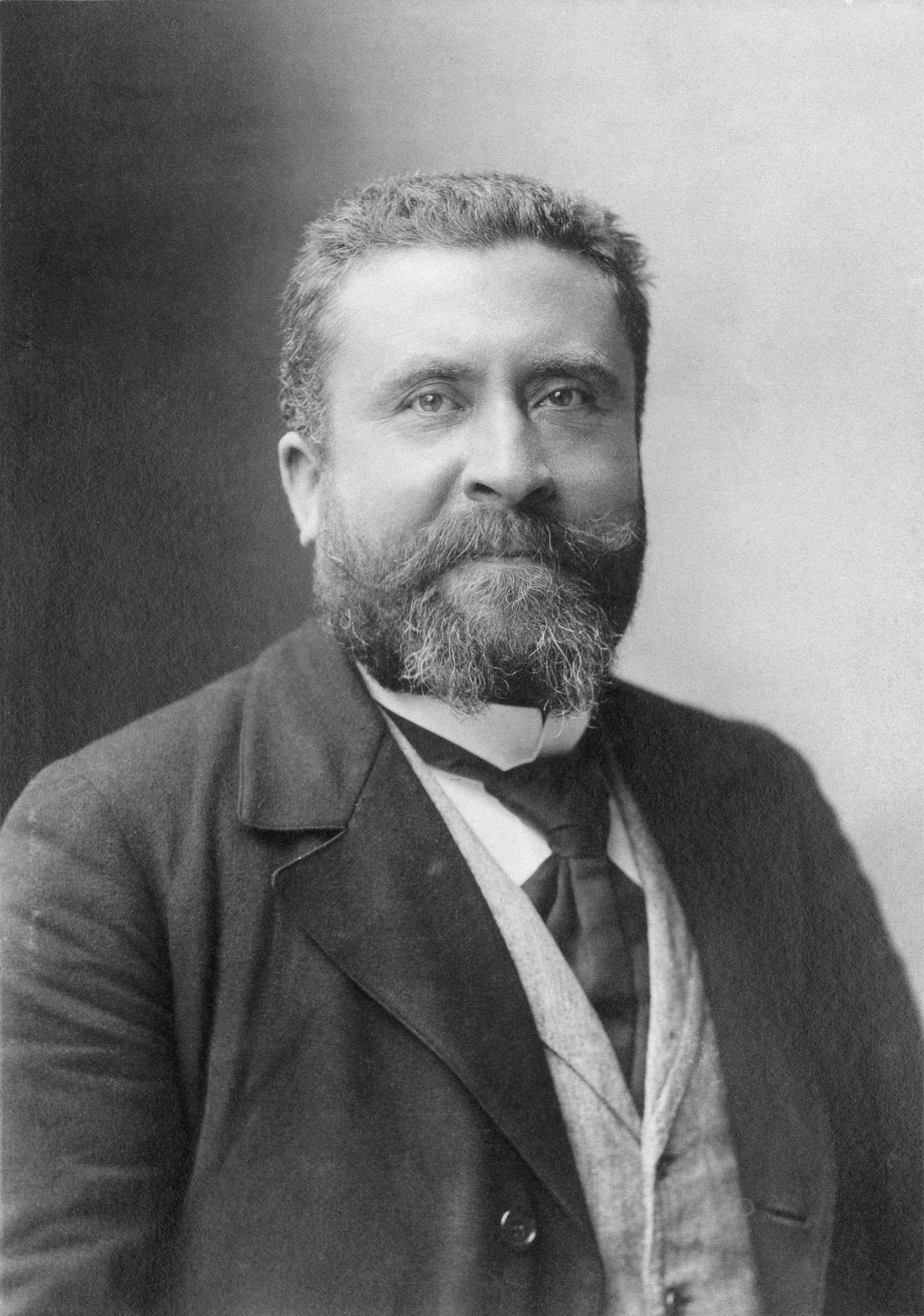
- Jaurès in 1904

Editor of L'Humanité
- In office 18 April 1904 – 31 July 1914
- Preceded by: Newspaper established
- Succeeded by: Pierre Renaudel

Member of the Chamber of Deputies
- In office 1 June 1902 – 31 July 1914
- Constituency: Tarn
- In office 8 January 1893 – 1 June 1898
- Constituency: Tarn
- In office 10 November 1885 – 11 November 1889
- Constituency: Tarn

President of the French Socialist Party
- In office 4 March 1902 – 25 April 1905
- Preceded by: Party established
- Succeeded by: Party abolished

Personal details
- Born: Auguste Marie Joseph Jean Léon Jaurès; 3 September 1859 Castres, Tarn, France
- Died: 31 July 1914 (aged 54) Paris, France
- Cause of death: Assassination
- Resting place: Panthéon
- Party: Moderate Republicans Independent Socialists; French Socialist Party French Section of the Workers' International
- Spouse: Louise Bois
- Children: 2
- Education: École Normale Supérieure
- Profession: Professor, journalist, historian
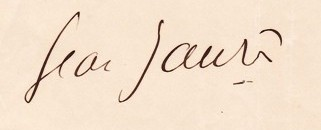
- Signature

Auguste Marie Joseph Jean Léon Jaurès (3 September 1859 – 31 July 1914), commonly referred to as Jean Jaurès (French: [ʒɑ̃ ʒɔʁɛs]; Occitan: Joan Jaurés [dʒuˈan dʒawˈɾes]), was a French socialist leader. Initially a Moderate Republican, he later became a social democrat and one of the first possibilists (the reformist wing of the socialist movement) and in 1902 the leader of the French Socialist Party, which opposed Jules Guesde's revolutionary Socialist Party of France. The two parties merged in 1905 into the French Section of the Workers' International (SFIO). An antimilitarist, he was assassinated in 1914 at the outbreak of World War I but remains one of the main historical figures of the French Left. As a heterodox Marxist, Jaurès rejected the concept of the dictatorship of the proletariat and tried to conciliate idealism and materialism, individualism and collectivism, democracy and class struggle, and patriotism and internationalism.

== Early career ==
The son of an unsuccessful businessman and farmer, Jean Jaurès was born in Castres, Tarn, into a modest French provincial haut-bourgeois family. His younger brother, Louis, became an admiral and a Republican-Socialist deputy.

A brilliant student, Jaurès was educated at the Lycée Sainte-Barbe in Paris and admitted first at the École normale supérieure, in philosophy, in 1878, ahead of Henri Bergson. He obtained his agrégation of philosophy in 1881, ending up third, and then taught philosophy for two years at the Albi lycée before lecturing at the University of Toulouse. He was elected Republican deputy for the département of Tarn in 1885, sitting alongside the moderate Opportunist Republicans, opposed both to Georges Clemenceau's Radicals and to the Socialists. He then supported both Jules Ferry and Léon Gambetta. On 29 June 1886 Jaurès married Louise Bois who despite Jaurès's secularism remained a devout Catholic.

=== Historian ===
In 1889, after unsuccessfully contesting the Castres seat, this time under the banner of Socialism, he returned to his professional duties at Toulouse, where he took an active interest in municipal affairs and helped to found the medical faculty of the university. He also prepared two theses for his doctorate in philosophy, De primis socialismi germanici lineamentis apud Lutherum, Kant, Fichte et Hegel ("On the first delineations of German socialism in the writings of [Martin] Luther, [Immanuel] Kant, [Johann Gottlieb] Fichte and [Georg Wilhelm Friedrich] Hegel") (1891), and De la réalité du monde sensible.

Jaurès became a highly influential historian of the French Revolution. Research in the archives in the Bibliothèque Nationale in Paris led him to the formulation of a theoretical Marxist interpretation of the events. His book Histoire Socialiste (1900–03) shaped interpretations—from Albert Mathiez (1874–1932), Albert Soboul (1914–1982) and Georges Lefebvre (1874–1959)—that came to dominate teaching analysis in class-conflict terms well into the 1980s. Jaurès emphasized the central role the middle class played in the aristocratic Brumaire, as well as the emergence of the working class "sans-culottes" who espoused a political outlook and social philosophy that came to dominate revolutionary movements on the left.

== Rise to prominence ==
Jaurès was initially a moderate republican, opposed to both Clemenceau's Radicalism and socialism. He developed into a socialist during the late 1880s, when he was in his late 20s. In 1892 the miners of Carmaux went on strike over the dismissal of their leader, Jean Baptiste Calvignac. Jaurès's campaigning forced the government to intervene and require Calvignac's reinstatement. The following year, Jaurès was re-elected to the National Assembly as socialist deputy for Tarn, a seat he retained (apart from the four years 1898 to 1902) until his death.

Defeated in the legislative election of 1898, he spent four years without a legislative seat. His eloquent speeches nonetheless made him a force to be reckoned with as an intellectual champion of socialism. He edited La Petite République, and was, along with Émile Zola, one of the most energetic defenders of Alfred Dreyfus during the Dreyfus Affair. He approved of Alexandre Millerand, and the socialist's inclusion in the René Waldeck-Rousseau cabinet, though this led to an irredeemable split with the more revolutionary section led by Jules Guesde forming the Independent Socialists Party.

== SFIO leadership ==
Jaurès's Action socialiste, 1899

In 1902, Jaurès returned as deputy for Albi. The independent socialists merged with Paul Brousse's "possibilist" (reformist) Federation of the Socialist Workers of France and Jean Allemane's Revolutionary Socialist Workers Party to form the French Socialist Party, of which Jaurès became the leader. They represented a social democratic stance, opposed to Jules Guesde's revolutionary Socialist Party of France.

During the Combes administration his influence secured the coherence of the Radical-Socialist coalition known as the Bloc des gauches, which enacted the 1905 French law on the Separation of the Churches and the State. In 1904, he founded the socialist paper L'Humanité. According to Geoffrey Kurtz, Jaures was "instrumental" in the reforms carried out by the administration, Emile Combes, "influencing the content of legislation and keeping the factions within the Bloc united." Following the Amsterdam Congress of the Second International, the French socialist groups held a Congress at Rouen in March 1905, which resulted in a new consolidation, with the merger of Jaurès's French Socialist Party and Guesde's Socialist Party of France. The new party, headed by Jaurès and Guesde, ceased to co-operate with the Radical groups, and became known as the Parti Socialiste Unifié (PSU, Unified Socialist Party), pledged to advance a collectivist programme. All the socialist movements unified the same year in the French Section of the Workers' International (SFIO).

On 1 May 1905 Jaurès visited a newly formed wine making cooperative in Maraussan. He said the peasants had to unite instead of refusing to help each other. He told them to, "in the vat of the Republic, prepare the wine of the Social Revolution!". As the revolt of the Languedoc winegrowers developed, on 11 June 1907 Jaurès filed a bill with Jules Guesde that proposed nationalization of the wine estates. After troops had shot wine-growing demonstrators later that month, Parliament renewed its confidence in the government. Jaurès's L'Humanité carried the headline, "The House acquits the mass killers of the Midi".

In the general elections of 1906, Jaurès was again elected for the Tarn. His ability was now generally recognized, but the strength of the SFIO still had to reckon with radical Georges Clemenceau, who was able to appeal to his countrymen (in a notable speech in the spring of 1906) to rally to a Radical programme which had no socialist ideas in view, although Clemenceau was sensitive to the conditions of the working class. Clemenceau's image as a strong and practical leader considerably diminished socialist populism. In addition to daily journalistic activity, Jaurès published Les preuves; Affaire Dreyfus (1900); Action socialiste (1899); Études socialistes (1902), and, with other collaborators, Histoire socialiste (1901), etc.

In 1911, he travelled to Lisbon and Buenos Aires. He supported, albeit not without criticisms, the teaching of regional languages, such as Occitan, Basque and Breton, commonly known as "patois", thus opposing, on this issue, traditional Republican Jacobinism. Jaures opposed imperialism, arguing that it posed a threat to peace in Europe.

== Anti-militarism ==
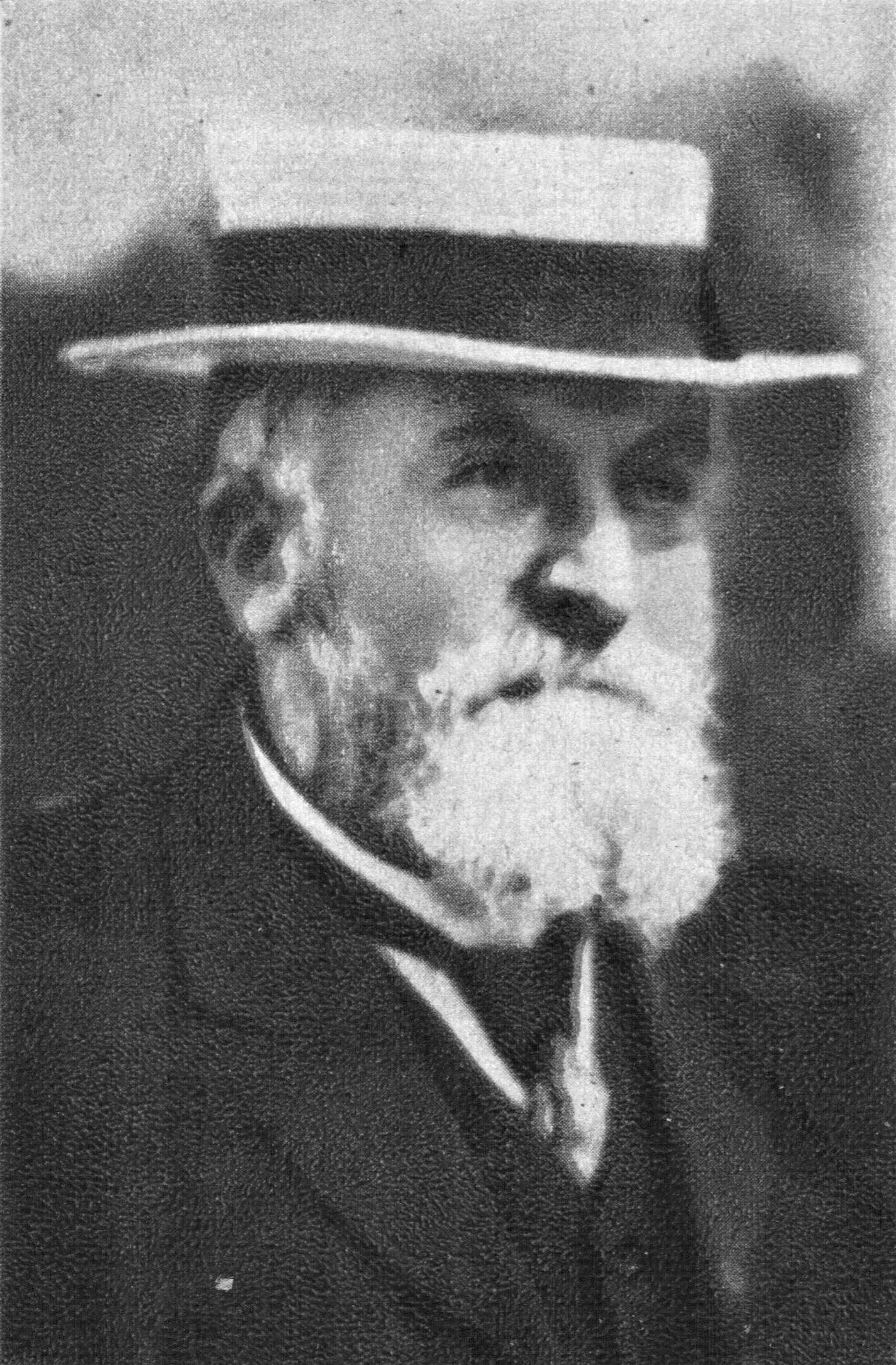
Jean Jaurès

Jaurès was a committed antimilitarist who tried to use diplomatic means to prevent what became the First World War. In 1913, he opposed Émile Driant's Three-Year Service Law, which implemented a draft period, and tried to promote understanding between France and Germany. As conflict became imminent, he tried to organise general strikes in France and Germany in order to force the governments to back down and negotiate. This proved difficult, however, as many Frenchmen sought revenge (revanche) for their country's defeat in the Franco-Prussian War and the return of the lost Alsace-Lorraine territory. Then, in May 1914, with Jaurès intending to form an alliance with Joseph Caillaux for the labour movement, the Socialists won the general election. They planned to take office and "press for a policy of European peace". Jaurès accused French President Raymond Poincaré of being "more Russian than Russia" and premier René Viviani as being compliant.

In July 1914, he attended the Socialist Congress in Brussels where he struck up a constructive solidarity with German socialist party leader Hugo Haase. On the 20th of that month, Jaurès voted against a parliamentary subsidy for Poincaré's visit to St. Petersburg; which he condemned as both dangerous and provocative. The Caillaux–Jaurès alliance was dedicated to defeating military objectives that were aimed at precipitating war. France sent a mission, headed by Poincaré, to coordinate French and Russian responses. Always a pacifist, Jaurès rushed back to Paris to attempt an impossible reconciliation with the government. Russia had partially mobilized, which Germany took as an extreme provocation.

== Assassination ==
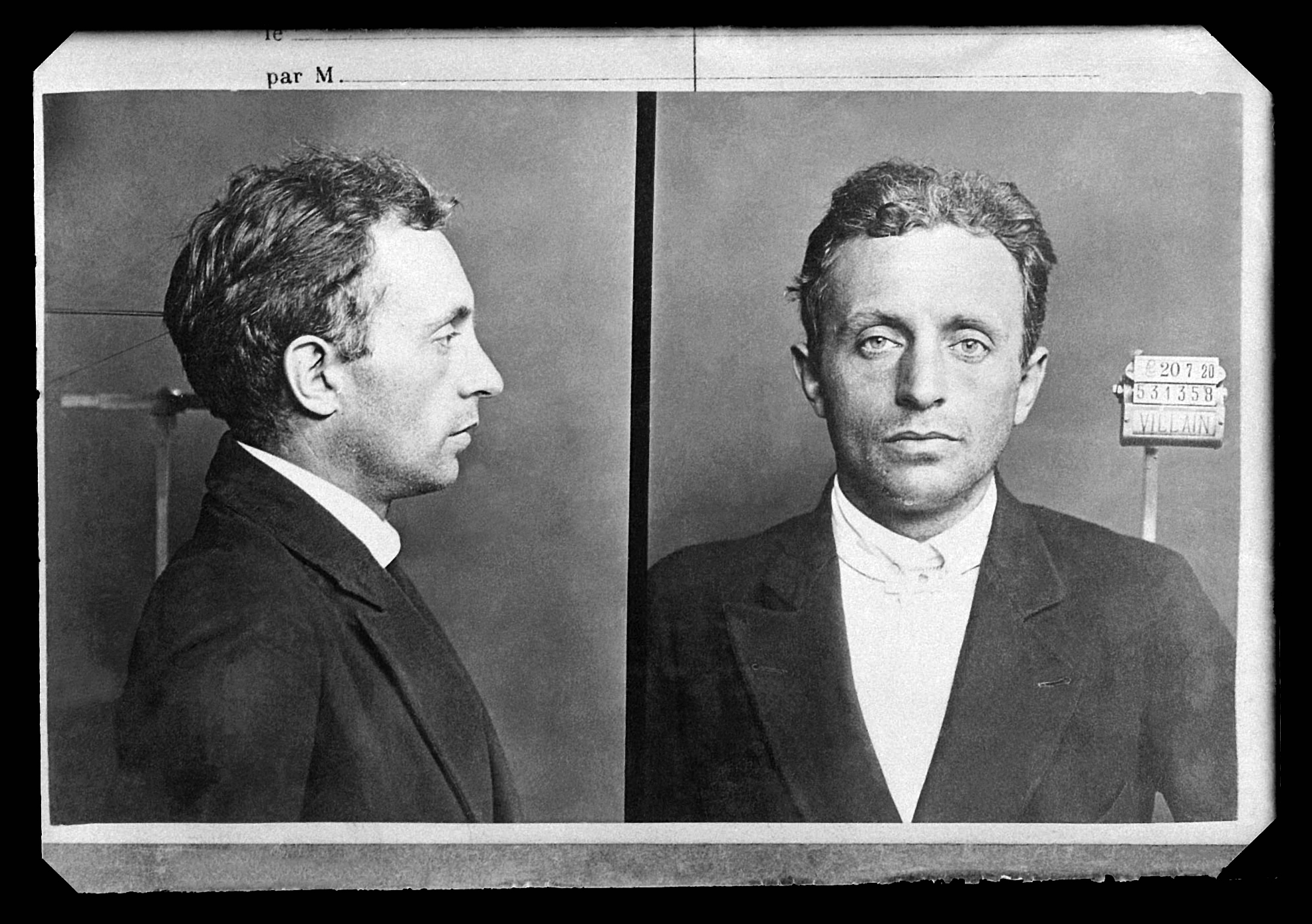
Raoul Villain mugshot 1920

On 31 July 1914, Jaurès was assassinated. At 9 pm, he went to dine at the Café du Croissant on Rue Montmartre. Forty minutes later, Raoul Villain, a 29-year-old French nationalist, walked up to the restaurant window and fired two shots into Jaurès's back. He died five minutes later at 9:45 pm. Jaurès had been due to attend an international conference on 9 August, in an attempt to dissuade the belligerent parties from going ahead with the war. Villain also intended to murder Henriette Caillaux with his two engraved pistols. Tried after World War I and acquitted, he was later killed by the Republicans in 1936 during the Spanish Civil War.

Shock waves ran through the streets of Paris. One of the government's most charismatic and compelling orators had been assassinated. His opponent, President Poincaré, sent his sympathies to Jaurès's widow. Paris was on the brink of revolution: Jaurès had been advocating a general strike and had narrowly avoided sedition charges. One important consequence was that the cabinet postponed the arrest of socialist revolutionaries. Viviani reassured Britain of Belgian neutrality but also said that "the gloves were off".

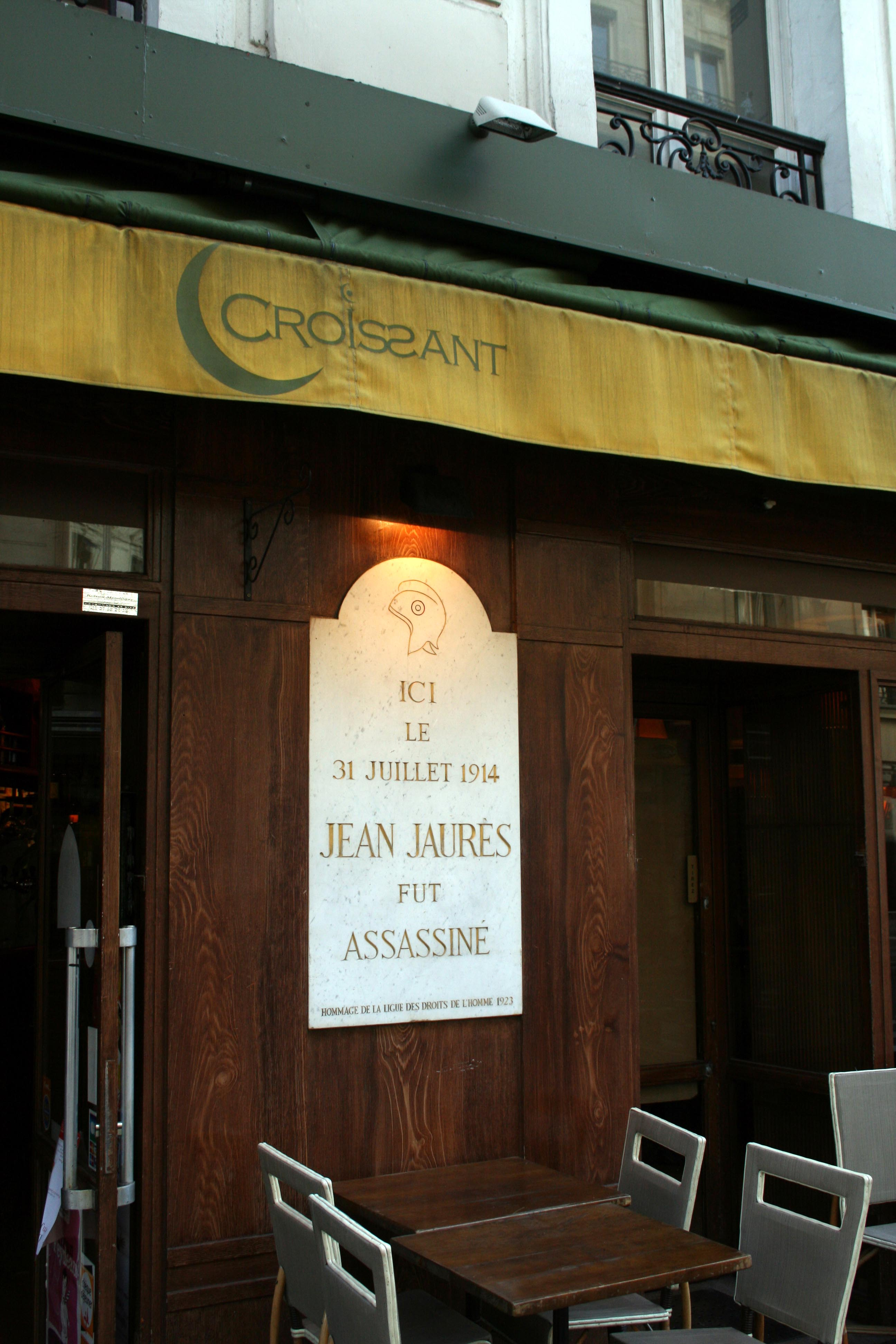
Commemorative plaque at the Café Croissant

Jaurès's murder brought matters one step closer to world war. It helped to destabilise the French government, whilst simultaneously breaking a link in the chain of international solidarity. Speaking at Jaurès's funeral a few days later, CGT leader Léon Jouhaux declared, "All working men ... we take the field with the determination to drive back the aggressor." As if in reverence to his memory, the Socialists in the Chamber agreed to suspend all sabotage activity in support of the Union Sacrée. Poincaré commented that, "In the memory of man, there had never been anything more beautiful in France."

On 23 November 1924, his remains were transferred to the Panthéon.

=== Political legacy ===
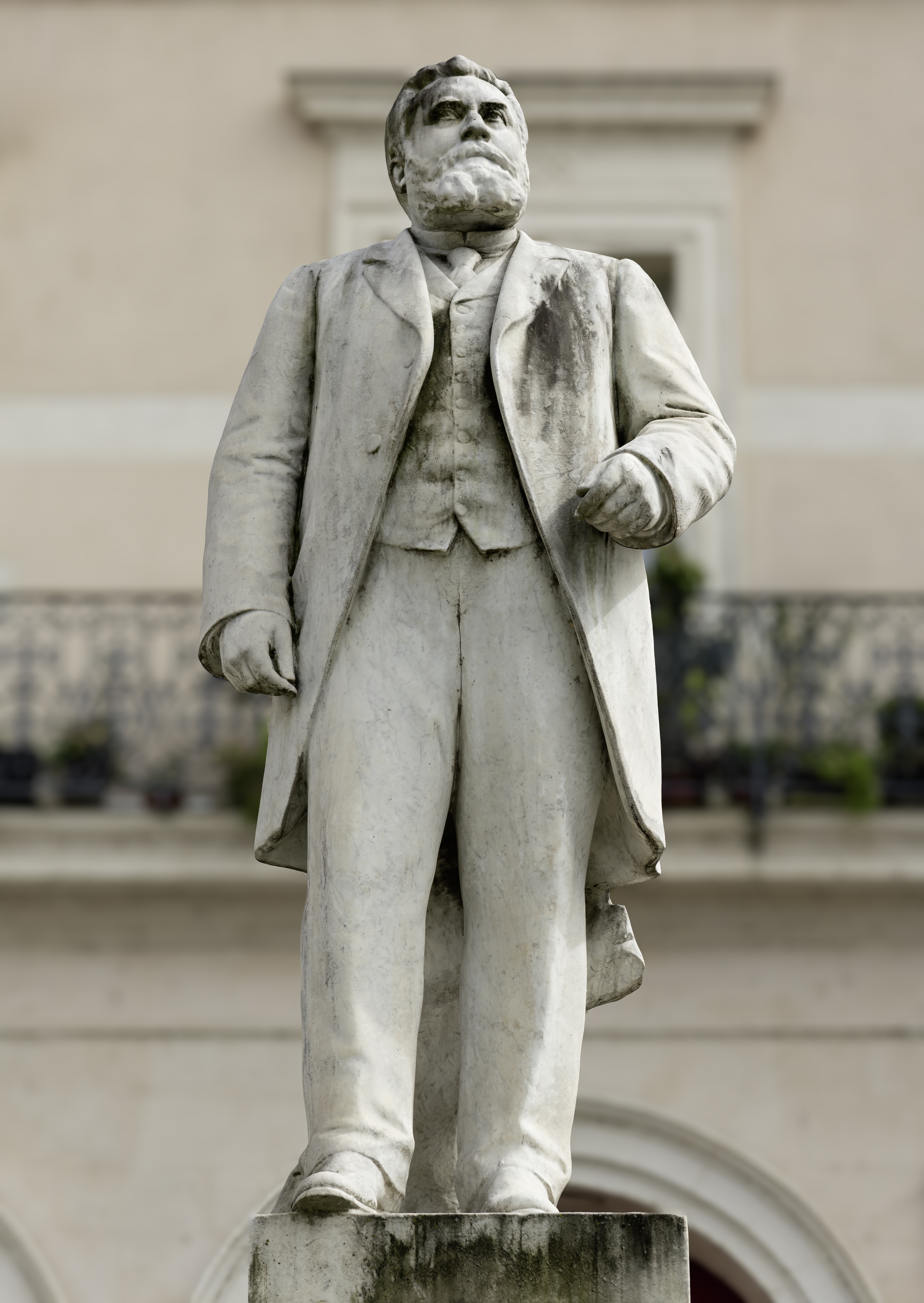
Monument of Jean Jaurès in Castres.

Joseph Caillaux and Jaurès were fellow anti-militarists trying to halt the slide to war in July 1914. But Caillaux was paralyzed, politically and emotionally, by the trial of his wife for murder. With the trial over (July 28) Caillaux and Jaurès hoped they could expose the President's secret deal with Russia, possibly leading to a policy of détente with Germany, preventing war and the inevitable carnage. Russia had covertly subsidized Poincaré's election campaign. Poincaré had, in this theory, therefore abandoned socialism for another party and warfare. Even if Germany intentionally condemned Belgium to occupation, they had already accused Russia of starting the conflict. This theory, downplaying Germany's aggressive moves, was not widely supported in France.

In the centenary year of his assassination, politicians from all sides of the political spectrum paid tribute to him and claimed he would have supported them. In 1981, the newly elected President François Mitterrand placed a rose at Jaurès's tomb in the Panthéon on the day of his inauguration ceremony. François Hollande declared that "Jaurès, the man of socialism, is today the man of all of France" while in 2007, Nicolas Sarkozy declared that his party was Jaurès's successor.

Numerous streets and squares in France are named for Jaurès, especially in the south of France, as well as in Vienna (Austria), Ghent (Belgium), Plovdiv (Bulgaria), Tel Aviv and Haifa (Israel), Buenos Aires (Argentina), Cluj (Romania) and also in Germany. Metro stations have been named after Jaurès in Paris (Jaurès and Boulogne - Jean Jaurès), Toulouse (Jean-Jaurès), and Lyon (Place Jean-Jaurès).

== See also ==
- Couitéas affair, attempted expropriation of Tunisian tribespeople's land, opposed by Jaurès
- Assassination of Jean Jaurès
- List of peace activists

== Bibliography ==
- Ducange, Jean-Numa; Marcobelli, Elisa, eds. (2021), Selected Writings of Jean Jaurès: On Socialism, Pacifism and Marxism, translated by Broder, David, Basingstoke: Palgrave Macmillan, ISBN 9783030719586
- Studies in Socialism, translated by Minturn, Mildred, 2025, ISBN 979-8288291135
- Speech To The Youth, Sydney: Planktos Press, 2024 [1903], ISBN 978-1922931061
- Democracy & Military Service, An abbreviated Translation of the Armée Nouvelle of Jean Jaurès. Edited by C.G. Coulton, with a Preface by Pierre Renaudel, Editor of L'Humanité, London: Simpkin, Marshall, Hamilton, Kent & Co., 2016 [1905]

== Sources ==
- Albertini, Luigi; Massey, Isabella M. (trans.) (2005) [1955]. The origins of the War of 1914 (1st English edition (Oxford, 1955), updated (Enigma, 2005), original Italian edition published in 1942–1943 in Milan, Italy, by Fratelli Bocca ed.). OxfordNew York: Oxford University Press (1st English ed., 1955) / Enigma Books (updated, 2005). ISBN 192963126X.
- Beatty, Jack (2012). The Lost History of 1914: Why the Great War was Not Inevitable. London: Bloomsbury. ISBN 978-1408827970. OCLC 864789028
- Bon, Nicolas (24 July 2023), "Midi 1907, l'histoire d'une révolte vigneronne", vin-terre-net.com (in French)
- This article incorporates text from a publication now in the public domain: Chisholm, Hugh, ed. (1911). "Jaurès, Jean Léon". Encyclopædia Britannica. Vol. 15 (11th ed.). Cambridge University Press. pp. 283–284.
- McMeekin, Sean (2014). July 1914: Countdown to War. Basic Books. ISBN 978-0465038862.
- Parent, Antoine; Parent, Marcel; Pradier, Pierre-Charles; Gauthier, Laurent (2025), "Jaurès's The New Army (1911): the organisation of democratic institutions as war prevention", Journal of Institutional Economics, 21 e23, doi:10.1017/S174413742500013X
- Théobald, Gérard (2014), La Liberté est ou n'est pas... (in French), Editions Publibook, ISBN 978-2-342-02233-9
- Vignerons coopérateurs de l'Hérault, Histoire de la coopération (in French), Vignerons coopérateurs de l'Hérault, archived from the original on 25 September 2011
