= Paul Lafargue =

French writer and activist (1842–1911)

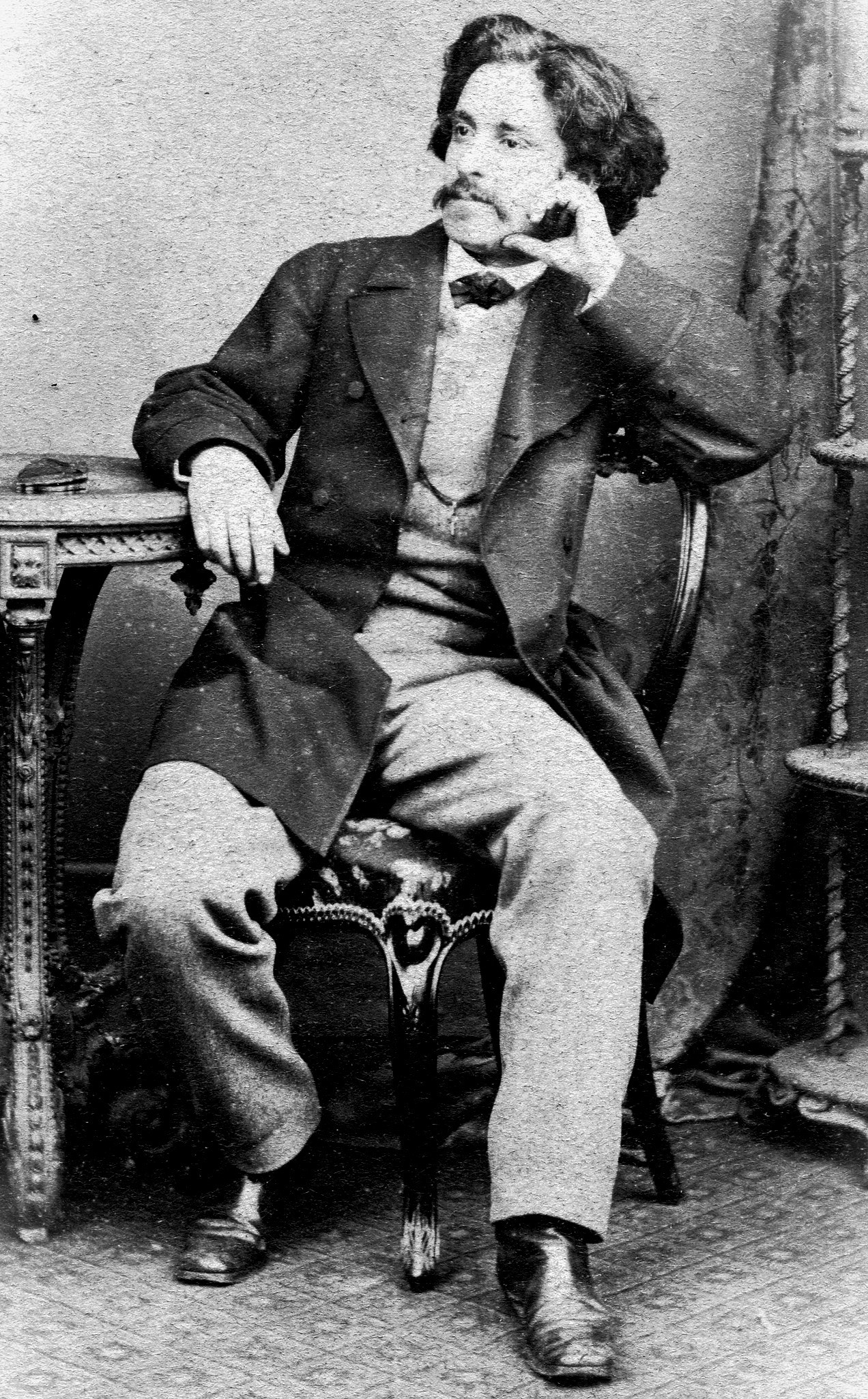
- Born: 15 January 1842; Santiago de Cuba, Spanish Cuba
- Died: 25 November 1911 (aged 69); Draveil, Paris, France
- Cause of death: Suicide
- Occupation: Physician
- Spouse: Laura Marx (m. 1868)
- Children: 3

Paul Lafargue (/ləˈfɑːrɡ/; French: [lafaʁg]; 15 January 1842 – 25 November 1911) was a Cuban-born French political writer, economist, journalist, literary critic, and activist. His best known work is The Right to Be Lazy. Born in Cuba to French and Creole parents, Lafargue spent most of his life in France, with periods in England and Spain.

He was Karl Marx's son-in-law, having married his second daughter, Laura. At the age of 69, he and 66-year-old Laura died together in a suicide pact.

Lafargue was the subject of a famous quotation by Marx. Soon before Marx died in 1883, he wrote a letter to Lafargue and the French Workers' Party organizer Jules Guesde, both of whom already claimed to represent "Marxist" principles. Marx accused them of "revolutionary phrase-mongering" and of denying the value of reformist struggles. This exchange is the source of Marx's remark, reported by Friedrich Engels, "ce qu'il y a de certain c'est que moi, je ne suis pas Marxiste" ("If one thing is certain it's that [if they are Marxists] I, I am not a Marxist").

== Early life and ancestry ==
Lafargue was born in 1842 in Santiago de Cuba. His father was the owner of coffee plantations in Cuba, and the family's wealth allowed Lafargue to study in Santiago and then in France. Each of Lafargue's grandparents was of a different ethno-religious origin. His paternal grandfather was a French Christian from the region of Bordeaux. His paternal grandmother was a mulatto from Saint-Domingue who had fled to Cuba following the Haitian Revolution. Lafargue's maternal grandparents were also refugees from Saint-Domingue. His maternal grandfather was a French Jew, and his maternal grandmother was a Jamaican woman who claimed to be of indigenous Taíno ancestry. Lafargue has remarked that he was an "international[ist] of blood before [he] was one of ideology" and that "the blood of three oppressed races runs in my veins". When Daniel De Leon asked him about his origins, he promptly replied, "I am proudest of my Negro extraction."

Karl Marx in various correspondence referred to him as "descendant of a gorilla", "Negro" and "Negrillo".

== First French period ==
In 1851, the Lafargue family relocated back to its hometown of Bordeaux, where Paul attended secondary school. Later he studied medicine in Paris. It was there that Lafargue started his intellectual and political career, endorsing Positivist philosophy, and communicating with the Republican groups that opposed Napoleon III. The work of Pierre-Joseph Proudhon seems to have particularly influenced him during this phase. As a Proudhonian anarchist, Lafargue joined the French section of the International Workingmen's Association (the First International). Nevertheless, he soon began communicating with two of the most prominent revolutionists: Marx and Auguste Blanqui, whose influence largely ended the anarchist tendencies of the young Lafargue.

In 1865, after participating in the International Students' Congress in Liège, Lafargue was banned from all French universities, and had to leave for London in order to start a career. It was there that he became a frequent visitor to Marx's house, meeting his second daughter Laura, whom he married at St Pancras registry office in April 1868. During their first three-years of marriage they had three children, two boys and a girl, all of whom died in infancy. They had no other children.

Lafargue was chosen as a member of the General Council of the First International, then appointed corresponding secretary for Spain, although he does not seem to have succeeded in establishing any serious communication with workers' groups in that country—Spain joined the international congress only after the Cantonalist Revolution of 1868, while events such as the arrival of the Italian anarchist Giuseppe Fanelli caused it to be influenced strongly by anarchism (and not the Marxism that Lafargue chose to represent).

Lafargue's opposition to anarchism became notorious when, after his return to France, he wrote several articles criticizing the Bakuninist tendencies that were very influential with some French workers' groups; this series of articles began a long career as a political journalist.

== Spanish period ==
After the revolutionary episode of the Paris Commune during 1871, political repression forced him to flee to Spain. He finally settled in Madrid, where he contacted some members of the International's Spanish chapter (FRE-AIT).

Unlike in other parts of Europe where Marxism came to have a dominant part, the FRE-AIT were mostly devotees of the International's anarchist faction (they were to remain very strong until the Spanish Civil War of the 1930s, and the subsequent dictatorship). Lafargue became involved with propagating Marxism, an activity that was directed largely by Friedrich Engels, and one that became intertwined with the struggles that both tendencies had internationally—as the Spanish federation of the International was one of the main endorsers of the anarchist group.

The task given to Lafargue consisted mainly of gathering a Marxist leadership in Madrid, while exercising an ideological influence through unsigned articles in the newspaper La Emancipación (where he defended the need to create a political party of the working class, one of the main topics opposed by the anarchists). At the same time, Lafargue took initiative through some of his articles, expressing his own ideas about a radical reduction of the working day (a concept which was not entirely alien to the original thought of Marx).

In 1872, after public criticism of La Emancipación against the new anarchist Federal Council of the FRE-AIT, the Federation of Madrid expelled the signatories of that article, who soon initiated the New Madrid Federation, a group of limited influence. The last activity of Lafargue as a Spanish activist was to represent this Marxist minority group in the 1872 Hague Congress which marked the end of First International as a united group of all communists.

== Second French period ==
Between 1873 and 1882, Paul Lafargue lived in London, and avoided practising medicine as he had lost faith in it after the death in infancy of his and Laura's three children. He opened a photolithography workshop, but its limited income forced him to request money from Engels (whose family co-owned the textile company Baumwollspinnerei Ermen & Engels) on several occasions. Thanks to Engels' assistance, he again began communicating with the French workers' movement from London, after it had started to regain popularity lost as a result of the reactionary repression under Adolphe Thiers during the first years of the Third Republic.

From 1880, he again worked as editor of the French socialist newspaper L'Égalité. During that same year, and in that publication, Lafargue began publishing the first draft of The Right to Be Lazy. In 1882, he started working in an insurance company, which allowed him to relocate back to Paris and become more involved with French socialist politics. Together with Jules Guesde and Gabriel Deville, he began directing the activities of the newly initiated French Workers' Party (Parti Ouvrier Français; POF), which he caused to conflict with other major left-wing trends: anarchism, as well as the Jacobin Radicals and Blanquists.

From then until his death, Lafargue remained the most respected theorist of the POF, not just extending the original Marxist doctrines, but also adding original ideas of his own. He also participated with public activities such as strikes and elections, and was imprisoned several times.

In 1891, despite being in police custody, he was elected to the French Parliament for Lille in a by-election, being the first-ever French Socialist to occupy such an office. His success would encourage the POF to remain engaged in electoral activities, and largely abandon the insurrectionist policies of its previous period.

Nevertheless, Lafargue continued his defence of Marxist orthodoxy against any reformist tendency, as shown by his conflict with Jean Jaurès, as well as his refusal to participate with any "bourgeois" government.

== Last years and suicide ==
In 1908, after a Congress in Toulouse, the different socialist tendencies were unified in the form of a single party. Lafargue opposed the social democratic reformism defended by Jaurès.

During these later years, Lafargue had already begun neglecting politics, living on the outskirts of Paris in the village of Draveil, limiting his contributions to a number of articles and essays, as well as occasional communication with some of the better-known socialist activists of the time, such as Karl Kautsky and Hjalmar Branting of the older generation, and Karl Liebknecht or Vladimir Lenin of the younger generation. It was in Draveil that Lafargue and his wife Laura Marx ended their lives together, to the surprise and even outrage of French and European socialists.

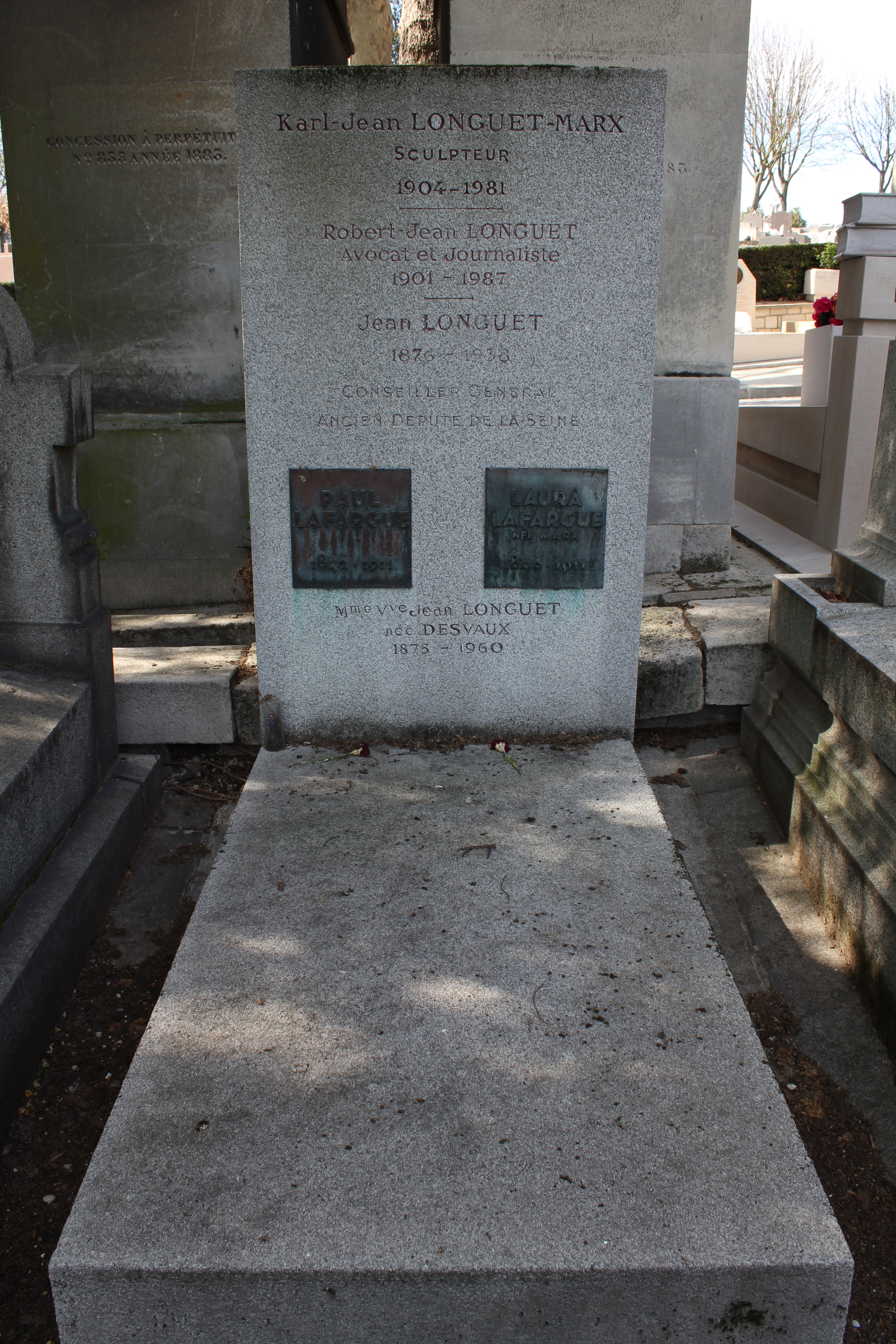
The Lafargues' tomb in the Père Lachaise Cemetery, Paris

In his suicide letter, Lafargue explained:

Healthy in body and mind, I end my life before pitiless old age which has taken from me my pleasures and joys one after another; and which has been stripping me of my physical and mental powers, can paralyse my energy and break my will, making me a burden to myself and to others.

For some years I had promised myself not to live beyond 70; and I fixed the exact year for my departure from life. I prepared the method for the execution of our resolution, it was a hypodermic of cyanide acid.

I die with the supreme joy of knowing that at some future time, the cause to which I have been devoted for forty-five years will triumph.

Long live Communism! Long live the international socialism!

Most well-known socialists deplored his decision publicly or privately; a few, notably the Spanish anarchist Anselmo Lorenzo, who had been a major political rival of Lafargue during his Spanish period, accepted his decision with understanding. Lorenzo wrote after Lafargue's death:

The double, original and, whatever the routine response, even sympathetic suicide of Paul Lafargue and Laura Marx [in Spain, women keep their maiden surname after marriage], who knew and could live united and lovers until death, has awakened my memories. [...] Lafargue was my teacher: his memory is for me almost as important as that of Fanelli. [...] [I]n Lafargue were two different aspects that made him appear in constant contradiction: affiliated to socialism, he was anarchist communist by intimate conviction; but enemy of Bakunin, by suggestion of Marx, he tried to damage Anarchism. Due to that double way of being, he caused different effect in those that had relations with him: the simple ones were comforted by his optimisms, but those touched by depressing passions changed friendship into hate and produced personal issues, divisions and created organizations that, because of original vice, will always give bitter fruit.

Adolf Abramovich Joffe, who later committed suicide to protest the expulsion of Leon Trotsky from the Central Committee of the Soviet Communist Party, noted in his final letter to Trotsky on the verge of committing suicide that he approved of the suicide pact of Lafargue and Marx in his youth:

When I was still an inexperienced youth, and the suicide of Paul Lafargue and his wife Laura Marx raised such an outcry in the socialist parties, I firmly defended the principled and correct nature of their positions. I recall that I vehemently objected to August Bebel, who was indignant over these suicides, that if one could argue against the age at which the Lafargues chose to die — for here we were dealing not with the number of years, but with the possible usefulness of a political figure — then one could by no means argue against the very principle of a political figure departing from this life at the moment when he felt that he would no longer bring any benefit to the cause to which he had devoted himself.

Vladimir Lenin, who was one of the speakers at the funeral as representative of RSDLP, later told his wife Nadezhda Krupskaya:

If one cannot work for the Party any longer, one must be able to look truth in the face and die like the Lafargues."

Paul Lafargue and Laura Marx were buried at division 76 (near the Communards' Wall) of the Père Lachaise Cemetery in Paris. Their nephew Jean Longuet and his wife and two sons later were buried in the same grave.

== Works ==
- Bourgeois Sentimentalism, L'Égalité (1881)
- Le droit à la paresse, 1880 (revised 1883)
- The Right to Be Lazy, 1883 (the English translation of Le droit à la paresse by Charles Kerr)
- Le matérialisme économique de Karl Marx, 1883
- Cours d'économie sociale, 1884
- —— (1887). La religion du capital. Paris: Bibliothèque socialiste de l'agglomération parisienne du parti ouvrier. OCLC 776826183 (all editions). (English translation: The religion of capital, 1918.)
- —— (1890). The Evolution of Property from Savagery to Civilization. London: S. Sonnenschein. OCLC 3470448 (all editions). (many new editions)
- Le socialisme utopique, 1892
- Le communisme et l'évolution économique, 1892
- Le socialisme et la conquête des pouvoirs publics, 1899
- La question de la femme, 1904
- Le déterminisme économique de Karl Marx, 1909

== See also ==
- History of feminism
- Rational suicide
- Refusal of work
- Strike action
