= Blanquism =

Left-wing revolutionary ideology

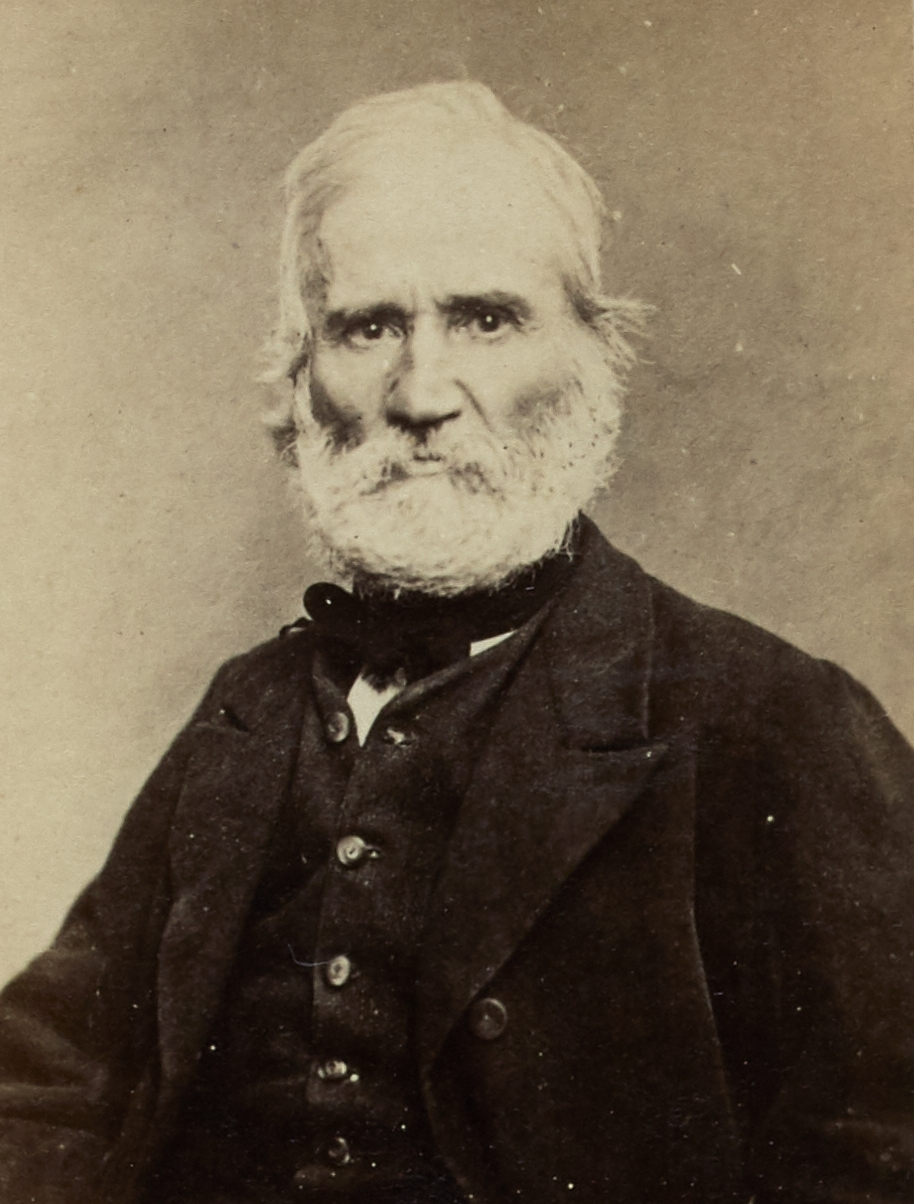
Louis-Auguste Blanqui

Blanquism (/ˈblɒŋkɪzəm/) refers to a conception of revolution generally attributed to Louis-Auguste Blanqui (1805–1881) that holds that socialist revolution should be carried out by a relatively small group of highly organised and secretive conspirators. Having seized power, the revolutionaries would then use the power of the state to introduce socialism. It is considered a particular sort of "putschism"—that is, the view that political revolution should take the form of a putsch or coup d'état.

Blanquism is distinguished from other socialist currents in various ways: on the one hand, Blanqui did not believe in the predominant role of the proletariat, nor did he believe in popular movements—instead he believed that revolution should be carried out by a small group of professional, dedicated revolutionaries, who would establish a temporary dictatorship by force. This dictatorship would permit the implementation of the basis of a new order, after which power would then be handed to the people. In another respect, Blanqui was more concerned with the revolution itself rather than the future society that would result from it—if his thought was based on precise socialist principles. Blanquist thought rarely goes so far as to imagine a purely socialist society. For Blanquists, the overturning of the bourgeois social order and the revolution are ends sufficient in themselves, at least for their immediate purposes.

== Central Revolutionary Committee ==
The Central Revolutionary Committee (CRC) was a French Blanquist political party founded in 1881 and dissolved in 1898.

The CRC was founded by Édouard Vaillant to continue the political struggle of Auguste Blanqui (1805–1881). The CRC was a Blanquist party, supporting revolutionary activism, atheism, patriotism, and the Jacobinism of the French Revolution. The CRC was weakened by a split in 1888, when numerous members (Henri Rochefort) followed General Georges Boulanger who synthesized Jacobin nationalism with socialism. Many saw Boulangism as a possible way to socialism. Following the Boulangist dissidence, Vaillant adopted a strategy of syndicalism and strike action.

The CRC was further re-enforced by the affiliation of the Revolutionary Communist Alliance (ACR), formed by dissidents of the Revolutionary Socialist Workers' Party (POSR) in 1896.

The CRC merged into the Socialist Revolutionary Party in 1898.

== Use of the term "Blanquism" ==
The term "Blanquism" has often been used polemically to accuse some revolutionaries of failing to sufficiently meld their praxis with the mass working class. Karl Marx and Friedrich Engels were keen to distinguish their conception of revolution from Blanquism. As Engels put it in a short fragment, The Program of the Blanquist Fugitives from the Paris Commune:

Blanqui is essentially a political revolutionist. He is a socialist only through sentiment, through his sympathy with the sufferings of the people, but he has neither a socialist theory nor any definite practical suggestions for social remedies. In his political activity he was mainly a "man of action", believing that a small and well organized minority, who would attempt a political stroke of force at the opportune moment, could carry the mass of the people with them by a few successes at the start and thus make a victorious revolution.

=== Vladimir Lenin ===
Rosa Luxemburg and Eduard Bernstein have criticised Vladimir Lenin on the grounds that his conception of revolution was elitist and essentially Blanquist. For instance, as part of a longer section on Blanquism in her Organizational Questions of the Russian Social Democracy (later published as Leninism or Marxism?), Luxemburg writes:

For Lenin, the difference between the Social Democracy and Blanquism is reduced to the observation that in place of a handful of conspirators we have a class-conscious proletariat. He forgets that this difference implies a complete revision of our ideas on organization and, therefore, an entirely different conception of centralism and the relations existing between the party and the struggle itself. Blanquism did not count on the direct action of the working class. It, therefore, did not need to organize the people for the revolution. The people were expected to play their part only at the moment of revolution. Preparation for the revolution concerned only the little group of revolutionists armed for the coup. Indeed, to assure the success of the revolutionary conspiracy, it was considered wiser to keep the mass at some distance from the conspirators.

By "social democracy", Luxemburg has in mind the original use of the term derived from Marx and synonymous with "socialism"; she conceived of the social democratic party as a mass-based organisation of working class struggle. However, Lenin dismissed as meaningless rhetoric the conflation of Blanquism with Bolshevism:

The bourgeoisie wants, by using the bogy of “Blanquism”, to belittle, discredit and slander the people’s struggle for power. The bourgeoisie stands to gain if the proletarians and peasants fight only for concessions from the old regime. The Right Social-Democrats use the word “Blanquism” merely as a rhetorical device in their polemics. The bourgeoisie converts this word into a weapon against the proletariat: “Workers, be reasonable! Fight for the extension of the powers of the Cadet Duma! Pull the chestnuts out of the fire for the bourgeoisie, but don't dare to think of such madness, anarchism, Blanquism, as fighting for complete power for the people!"

Lenin himself denied any accusations of Blanquism in The State and Revolution (1917) and accused Bernstein of "opportunism".

== Bibliography ==
- Bernstein, Samuel. Auguste Blanqui. 1970.
- Hutton, Patrick. The Cult of the Revolutionary Tradition: The Blanquists in French Politics, 1864-1893. 1981.
- Spitzer, Alan. The Revolutionary Theories of Louis-Auguste Blanqui. 1951.
