= French Socialist Party (1902) =

Political party in France (1902–1905)

French Socialist Party Parti socialiste français
- Leader: Jean Jaurès
- Founded: 1902; 124 years ago
- Dissolved: 25 April 1905; 120 years ago
- Merger of: Federation of the Socialist Workers of France; Revolutionary Socialist Workers' Party
- Merged into: French Section of the Workers' International
- Headquarters: Paris, France
- Newspaper: L'Humanité
- Ideology: French Left; Possibilism; Social democracy
- Political position: Left-wing
- Colours: Red

The French Socialist Party (French: Parti socialiste français, PSF) was a social democratic political party in France, founded in 1902 and disestablished in 1905.

The PSF came from the merger of the possibilist Federation of the Socialist Workers of France (FTSF), Jean Allemane's Revolutionary Socialist Workers' Party (POSR), and some independent socialist politicians like Jean Jaurès, who went on to become the party's leader.

Unlike the Socialist Party of France (PSdF) led by Jules Guesde, the PSF supported the principle of the alliance with the non-socialist left in the Bloc des gauches coalition. Under pressure from the Second International, the two parties merged into the French Section of the Workers' International in 1905.

== See also ==
- Bloc des gauches
- Communism in France
- French Section of the Workers' International
- French Workers' Party
- History of the Left in France
- Marxist philosophy
- Paris Commune
- Socialist Party of France
- Socialist Revolutionary Party
