= Édouard Vaillant =

French politician

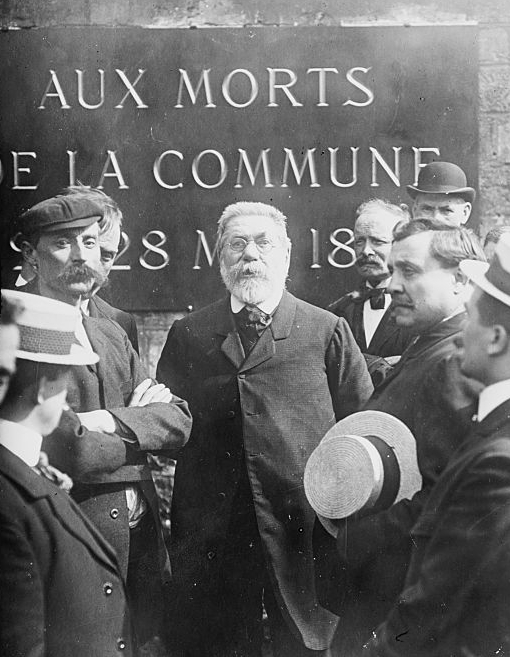
Édouard Vaillant

Marie Édouard Vaillant (26 January 1840 – 18 December 1915) was a French politician.

Born in Vierzon, Cher, son of a lawyer, Édouard Vaillant studied engineering at the École Centrale des Arts et Manufactures, graduating in 1862, and then law at the Sorbonne. In Paris he knew Charles Longuet, Louis-Auguste Rogeard, and Jules Vallès. A reader of Pierre-Joseph Proudhon's writings, he met Proudhon, and joined the International Workingmen's Association.

He went to study in Germany in 1866. At the outbreak of the Franco-Prussian War in 1870 he returned to Paris. It was during the Siege of Paris that Vaillant met Auguste Blanqui. Vaillant opposed the Government of National Defence, and took part in the revolts on 31 October 1870 and 22 January 1871.

He was one of the four editors of the Affiche Rouge (red poster) calling for the creation of the Paris Commune. In the elections of February 1871 he stood as a revolutionary socialist candidate for the National Assembly but was not elected. In March 1871 he was elected by the 20th arrondissement to the council of the Commune where he oversaw work on education.

Following the bloody suppression of the Commune in late May 1871, Vaillant fled France with Eugène Baudin for Great Britain where he was part of the Blanquist tendency of the First International. He was sentenced to death in absentia in July 1872 and did not return to France until the general amnesty of 1880.

Active in socialist politics, Vaillant was elected to the Chamber of Deputies in 1893, representing the 20th arrondissement. Although he had earlier been a convinced revolutionary, in the Chamber he generally followed a middle ground between the "revolutionaries" represented by Jules Guesde and the "reformists" represented by Jean Jaurès. He was among the founder members of the French Section of the Workers' International (SFIO), a socialist party uniting revolutionary and reformist groups.

Vaillant supported a general strike to prevent French participation in the First World War, but following the assassination of Jaurès and the outbreak of war, he joined the majority of socialists in supporting the Union sacrée and harshly criticised pacifist members of the SFIO in his speeches.

Édouard Vaillant died in Paris on 18 December 1915. Schools in his birthplace of Vierzon, and in Gennevilliers, are named in his honour.
