= Socialist Party of France (1902) =

Revolutionary socialist party in France (1902–1905)

Socialist Party of France Parti socialiste de France
- Leader: Jules Guesde
- Founded: 1902; 124 years ago
- Dissolved: 25 April 1905; 121 years ago
- Merger of: Socialist Revolutionary Party; French Workers' Party
- Merged into: French Section of the Workers' International
- Headquarters: Paris, France
- Ideology: Socialism; Anti-capitalism
- Political position: Left-wing
- Colours: Red

The Socialist Party of France (Parti socialiste de France) was a socialist political party.

The party was founded in 1902 during a congress in Commentry by the merger of the Marxist French Workers' Party led by Jules Guesde and the Blanquist Socialist Revolutionary Party of Édouard Vaillant.

Unlike the French Socialist Party of Jean Jaurès, it refused to support bourgeois governments and so to take part in the Bloc des gauches coalition.

However, the two parties merged in 1905 under the pressure of the Second International into the French Section of the Workers' International.
