= Revolutionary Socialist Workers' Party (France) =

Defunct socialist party of the French Third Republic

Revolutionary Socialist Workers' Party Parti ouvrier socialiste révolutionnaire
- Founder: Jean Allemane
- Founded: 1890; 136 years ago
- Dissolved: 1902; 124 years ago
- Split from: FTSF
- Merged into: PSF
- Ideology: Syndicalism; Socialism
- Political position: Left-wing
- Colours: Red

The Revolutionary Socialist Workers' Party (French: Parti ouvrier socialiste révolutionnaire, POSR) was a French socialist political party founded by Jean Allemane in 1890 and dissolved in 1901. It is indirectly one of the founding factions of the French Section of the Workers' International (SFIO), which was founded in 1905.

The POSR was founded by a dissidence from the Federation of the Socialist Workers of France (FTSF) led by Jean Allemane. The party, which along with Allemane was a strong believer of the primacy of syndicalism in politics, became a base of future revolutionary syndicalism and parties of a similar ideology would occasionally be described as Allemaniste.

However, next to the working-class socialism of Allemane, an intellectual socialist movement developed within the POSR, led by Lucien Herr, a librarian. This movement's priority was the education of the people. Overall, the POSR was a moderate reformist party, influenced by possibilism which believed that socialism could be achieved through democratic action, such as decentralization and legislative participation.

In 1902, the POSR merged with the FTSF and Independent Socialists to form the French Socialist Party (PSF).

In 1905, the PSF was along with the Socialist Party of France a founding member of the French Section of the Workers' International (SFIO).

== See also ==
- Federation of the Socialist Workers of France
- French Section of the Workers' International
- French Socialist Party
- History of the Left in France
