= Paris in World War I =

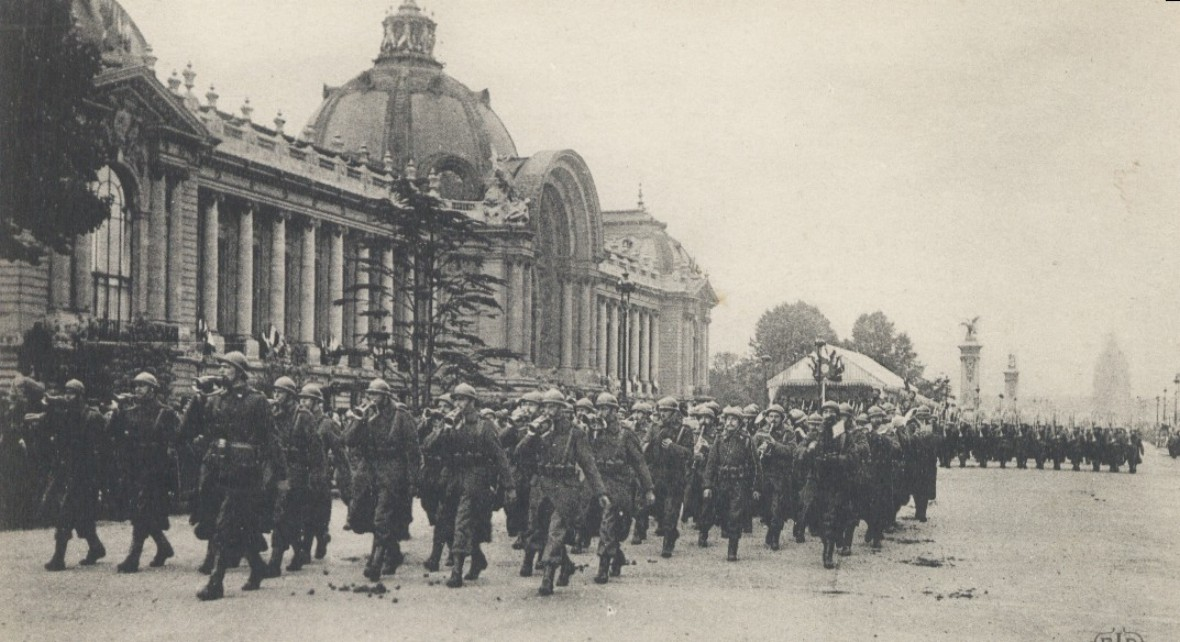
French soldiers march past the Petit Palais (1916)

Parisians entered the First World War (1914–1918) in August 1914 on a wave of patriotic fervor, but within a few weeks Paris was close to the front lines and bombarded by German aircraft and artillery. The Parisians endured food shortages, rationing, and an epidemic of influenza, but morale remained high until near the end of the war. With the departure of young men to the front lines, women took a much greater place in the work force. The city also saw a large influx of immigrants who came to work in the defense factories. The end of the war on November 11, 1918, saw huge celebrations on the boulevards of Paris.

== Paris mobilizes ==
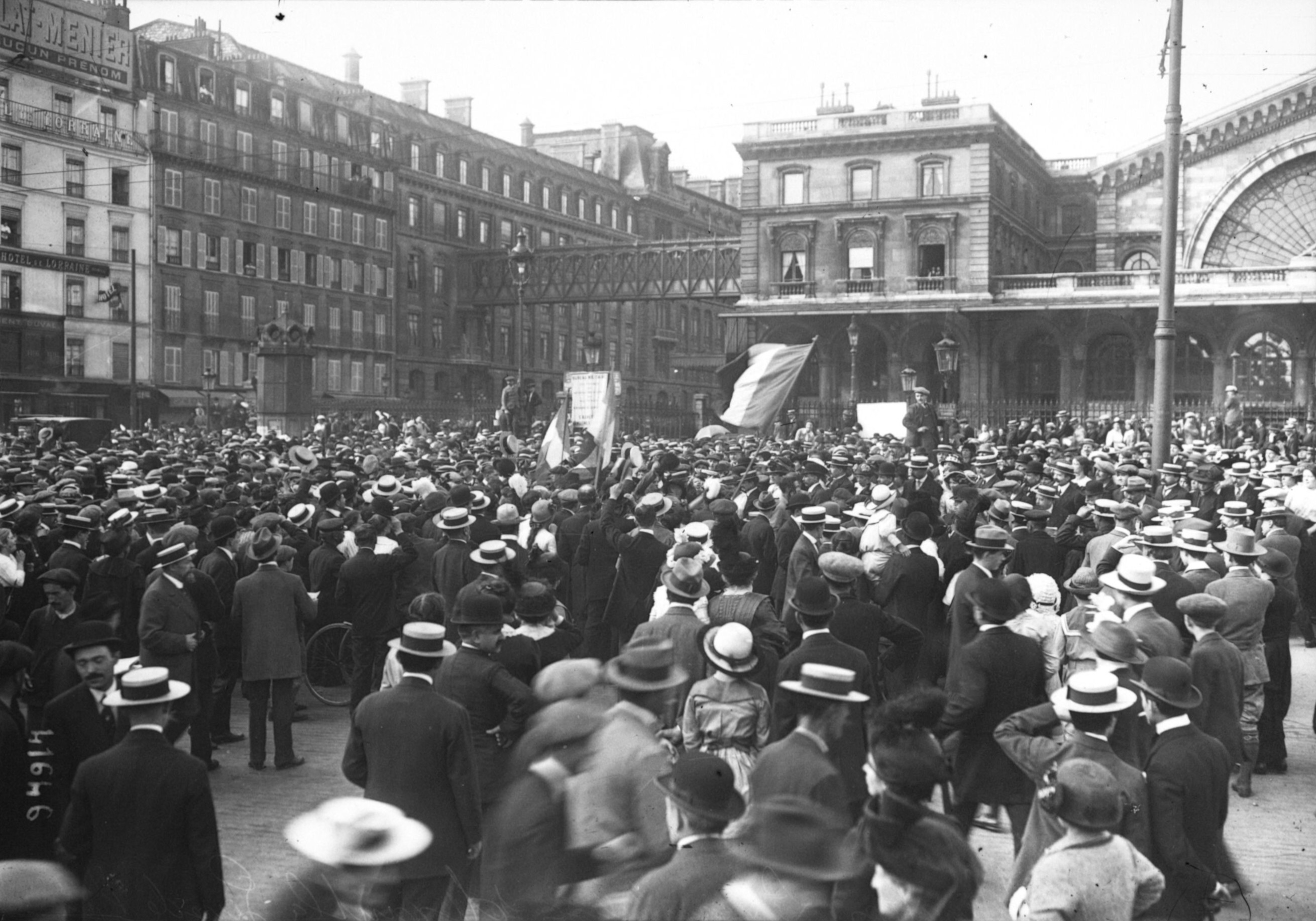
A crowd of reservists being mobilized at the Gare de l'Est (2 August 1914)

On June 28, 1914, the news reached Paris of the assassination of the Archduke Franz Ferdinand of Austria by Serbian nationalists in Sarajevo. Austria-Hungary declared war on Serbia on July 28, and following the terms of their alliances, the German Empire joined Austria-Hungary, while Russia, Great Britain and France went to war against Austria-Hungary and Germany in quick succession. The war was opposed by some prominent socialists and pacifists, but the press and most political leaders pressed for war. On July 31, one day before a general mobilization was declared in France, one of the most prominent leaders of the French Left, the socialist politician Jean Jaurès, an outspoken opponent of going to war, was assassinated at the Café Croissant on Montmartre, not far from the offices of the socialist newspaper L'Humanité, by Raoul Villain, a mentally-unstable man who considered Jaurès an "enemy of France."

Most male Parisians of military age were required to report on August 2 to designated stations around the city for mobilization into the army. The army command expected that up to thirteen percent would not appear, but to their surprise all but one percent appeared as ordered. The poet and novelist Anatole France, at the age of seventy, appeared at the recruitment station to show his support. The Ministry of the Interior was prepared to arrest prominent pacifists and socialists who opposed the war, but, in the face of little opposition to the war, the arrests were never carried out. The next day, August 3, Germany declared war on France.

== Paris on the front lines ==
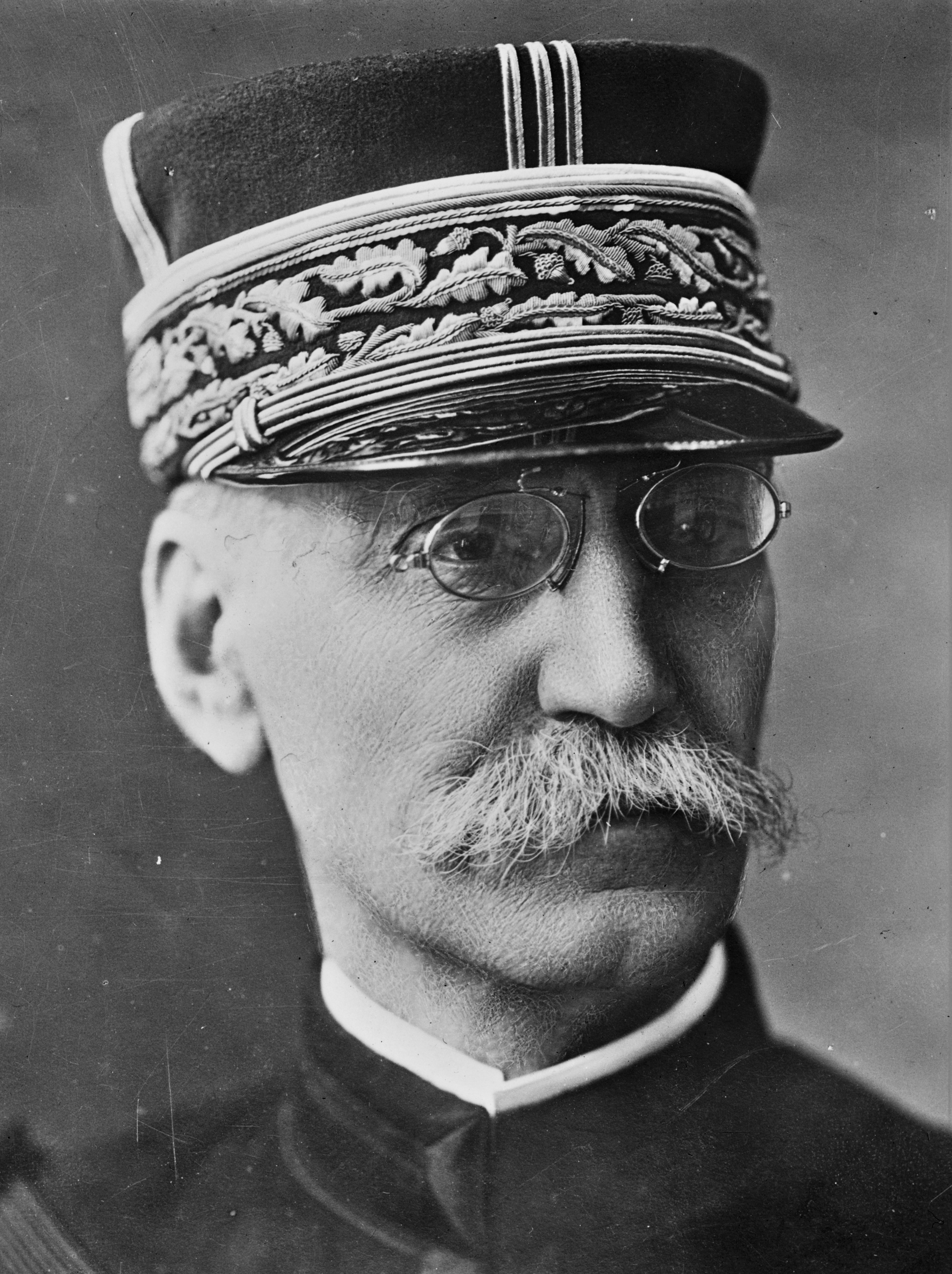
General Joseph Gallieni, the military governor of Paris at the start of World War I in 1914

The outbreak of the First World War in August 1914 saw patriotic demonstrations on the Place de la Concorde and at the Gare de l'Est and Gare du Nord as the mobilized soldiers departed for the front. But while the Paris newspapers were confident of a quick victory, the Imperial German Army swept through Belgium and marched rapidly toward Paris.

On 26 August, trainloads of refugees from Belgium arrived at the Gare du Nord and were given shelter at the Cirque de Paris. On 30 August, a German plane appeared over Paris and dropped three bombs, one on the Rue des Récollets, one on the Quai de Valmy and the third on the Rue des Vinaigriers; the last bomb killed an elderly woman and wounded three persons. City authorities did not allow the casualties to be mentioned in the press. Another plane appeared on August 31 to drop a message with the claim that the Germans had defeated the French Army at Saint-Quentin, and a third plane appeared on September 1, this time to drop more bombs that killed one person and injured sixteen. These casualties were also concealed from the public.

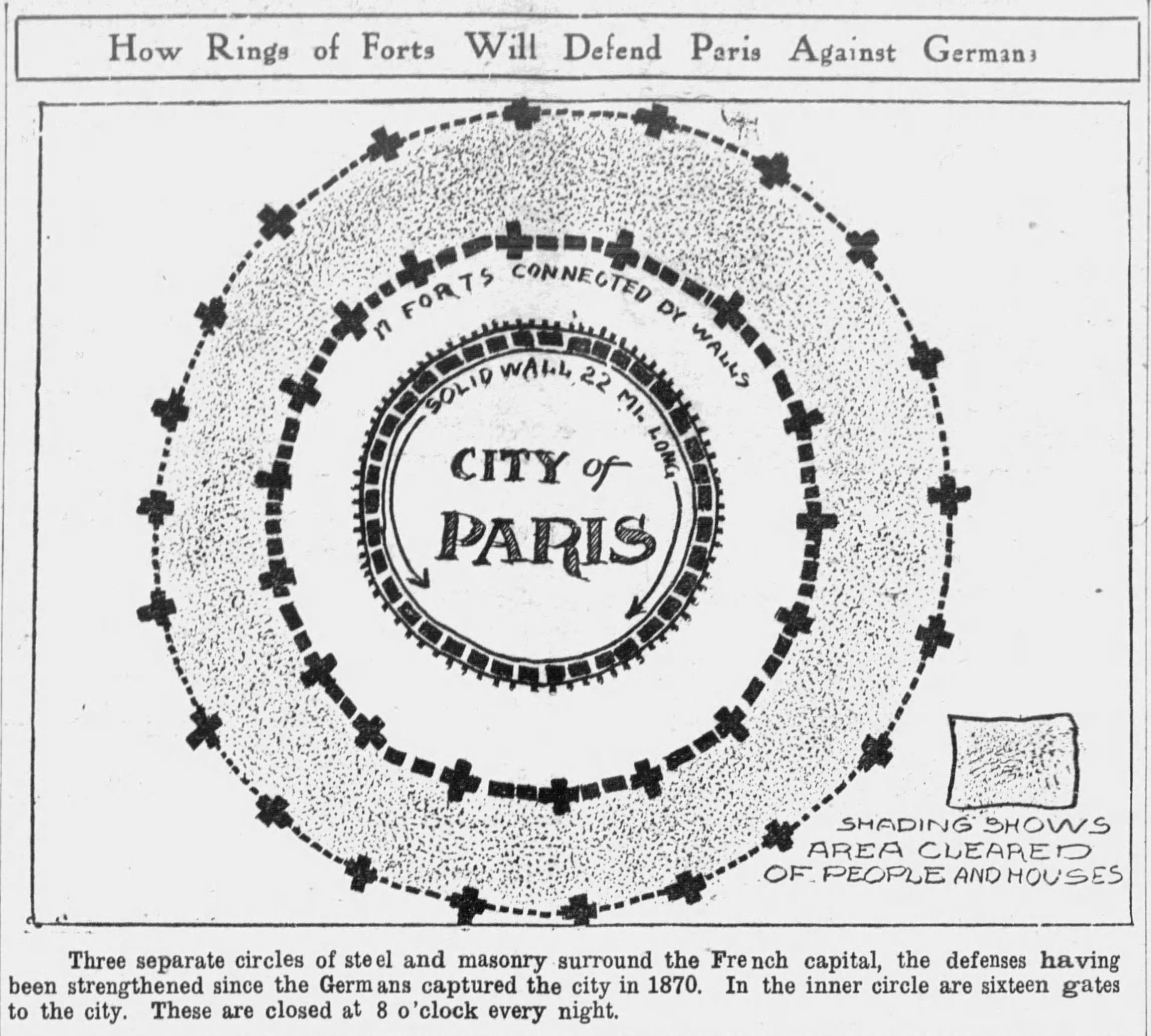
Diagram of defensive forts (1914)

On August 26, the same day that the refugees from Belgium began arriving in the city, General Joseph Gallieni was called from retirement and appointed military governor of Paris, a title that dated back to the fourteenth century. He quickly began organizing the defenses of the city; the forts around the city were prepared for action, 376 cannons and batteries of new 75-millimeter guns were placed around the city to defend it against aerial attack, and machine guns and a cannon were placed on the Eiffel Tower. Herds of cattle were brought into the city to provide meat in the event of a long siege. The important masterpieces of the Louvre were transported to Toulouse for safekeeping. As the German army drew closer, French President Raymond Poincaré decided to move the French government and the National Assembly to safety in Bordeaux, as had been done in the Franco-Prussian War of 1870–71. On September 2, posters appeared around the city announcing that "The members of the government of the Republic have left Paris to give a new impulse to the national defense."

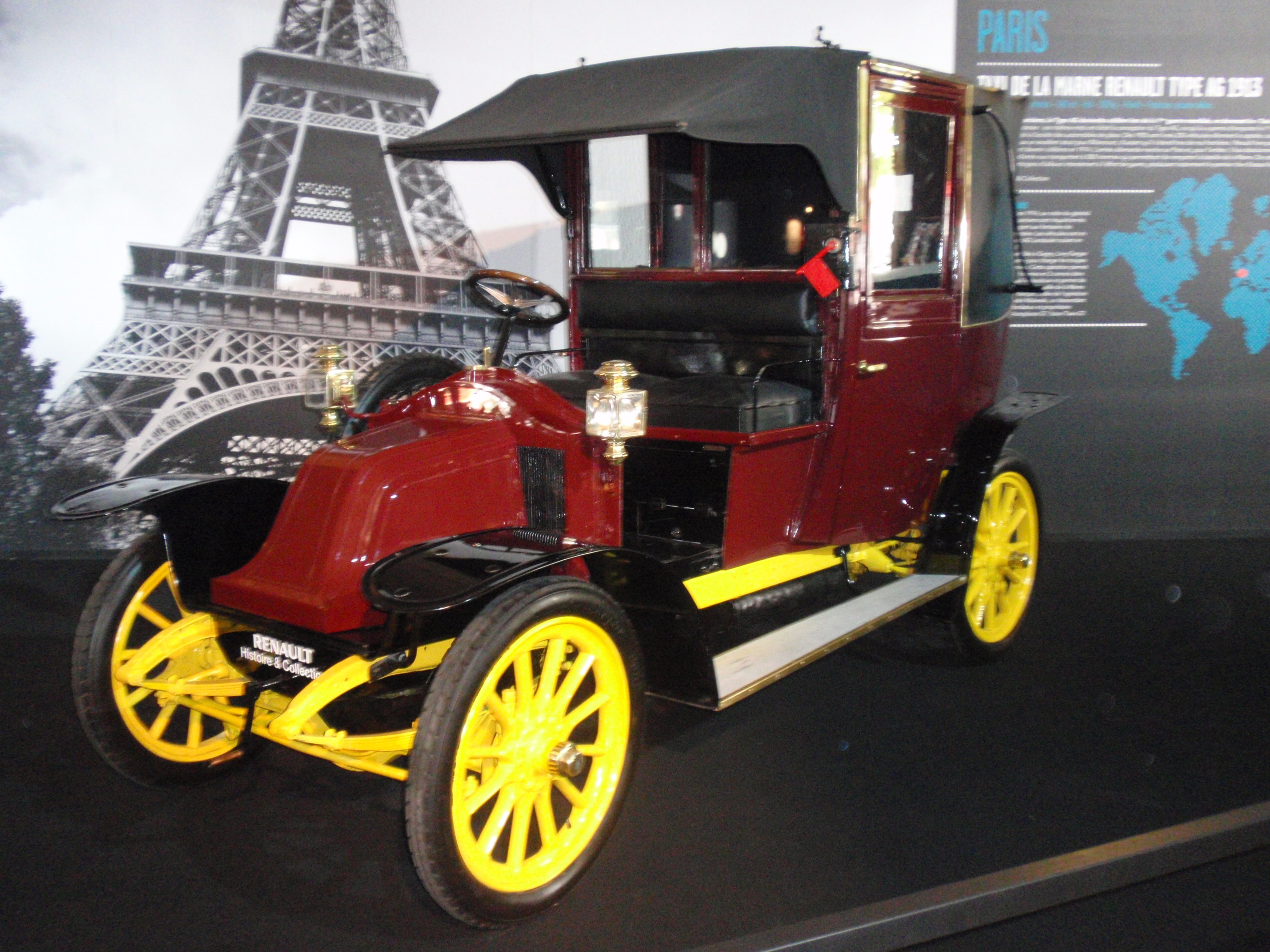
Paris taxis carried 6000 soldiers to the front during the First Battle of the Marne

By the first week of September, the Germans had come within thirty kilometers of the Cathedral of Notre-Dame de Paris. The French and British armies were engaged in fierce fighting with the Germans in the First Battle of the Marne. When one of the German armies turned southeast to attack the French army on the flank, it opened a gap between the German armies, and the French forces, led by Marechal Joffre, saw an opportunity to attack them on their own flank. General Gallieni decided to send all of his reserves from Paris to the front to aid the attack, but lacked enough trains and omnibuses to move the soldiers. On September 5, Gallieni requisitioned a thousand private vehicles, including about six hundred Paris taxicabs and their drivers to carry soldiers to the front at Nanteuil-le-Haudouin, fifty kilometers away. The drivers were assembled on the evening of September 6 on the esplanade of Les Invalides. They were mostly the Renault AG1 Landaulet model, with an average speed of 25 kilometres per hour (16 mph). Within twenty-four hours, the Villemomble and Gagny battalions, about six thousand soldiers and officers, were moved to the front at Nanteuil-le-Haudouin. Each taxi carried five soldiers, four in the back and one next to the driver. Only the back lights of the taxis were lit; the drivers were instructed to follow the lights of the taxi ahead. Most of the taxis were demobilized on September 8, but some remained longer to carry the wounded and refugees. The taxis, following city regulations, dutifully ran their meters. The French treasury reimbursed the total fare of 70,012 francs. The Germans were surprised and pushed back by the French and British armies. The number of soldiers transported by taxi was small compared to the huge armies engaged in the battle, and the military impact was minor, but the effect on French morale was enormous; it demonstrated the solidarity between the people and the army.

Fearing a long siege, General Gallieni did what he could to reduce the number of Parisians who needed to be fed; a dozen free trains were organized on 5 September to take Parisians to the French provinces. An emergency census ordered by Gallieni on September 8 showed that the population of Paris had dropped to 1,800,000, or only 63 percent of the population counted in 1911. By October, public transportation was again running in the city. The military government declared a moratorium on rents for those Parisians who had been summoned into the army and protected them from legal action until the end of the war. As of December 20, pedestrians could walk freely in Paris once again, but vehicles were only allowed to enter and leave Paris by fourteen of the fifty-five city gates that were open from five in the morning until ten at night. The government returned to Paris on December 11, and President Poincaré was again able to meet with his Council of Ministers in the Élysée Palace. The front lines moved further north, and by 4 January 1915, Paris was no longer considered to be threatened. Nonetheless, the city was bombed by a German Zeppelin airship on March 21, 1915, and by German planes on May 11 and May 22.

== Daily life ==
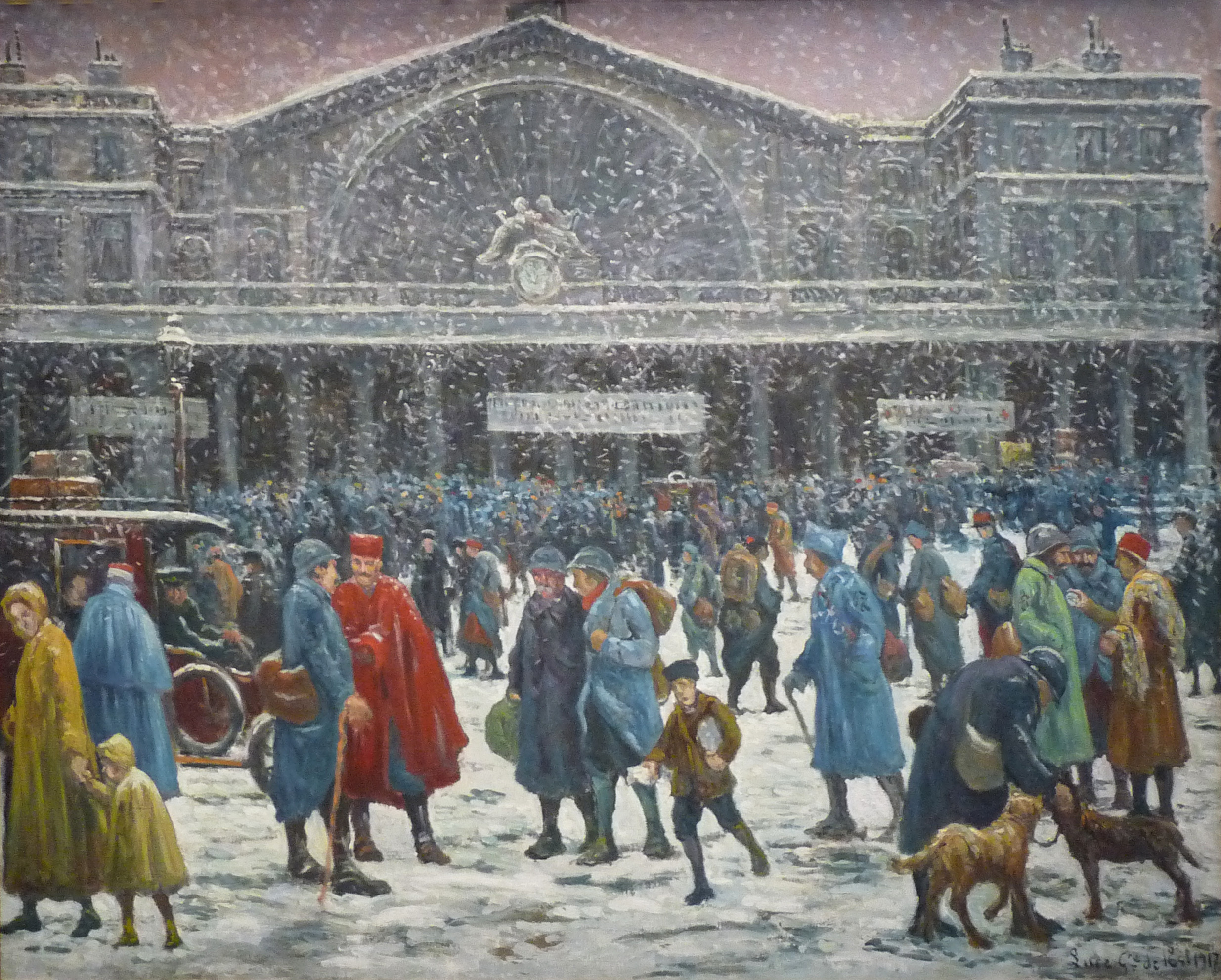
The Gare de l'Est during snowfall (1917)

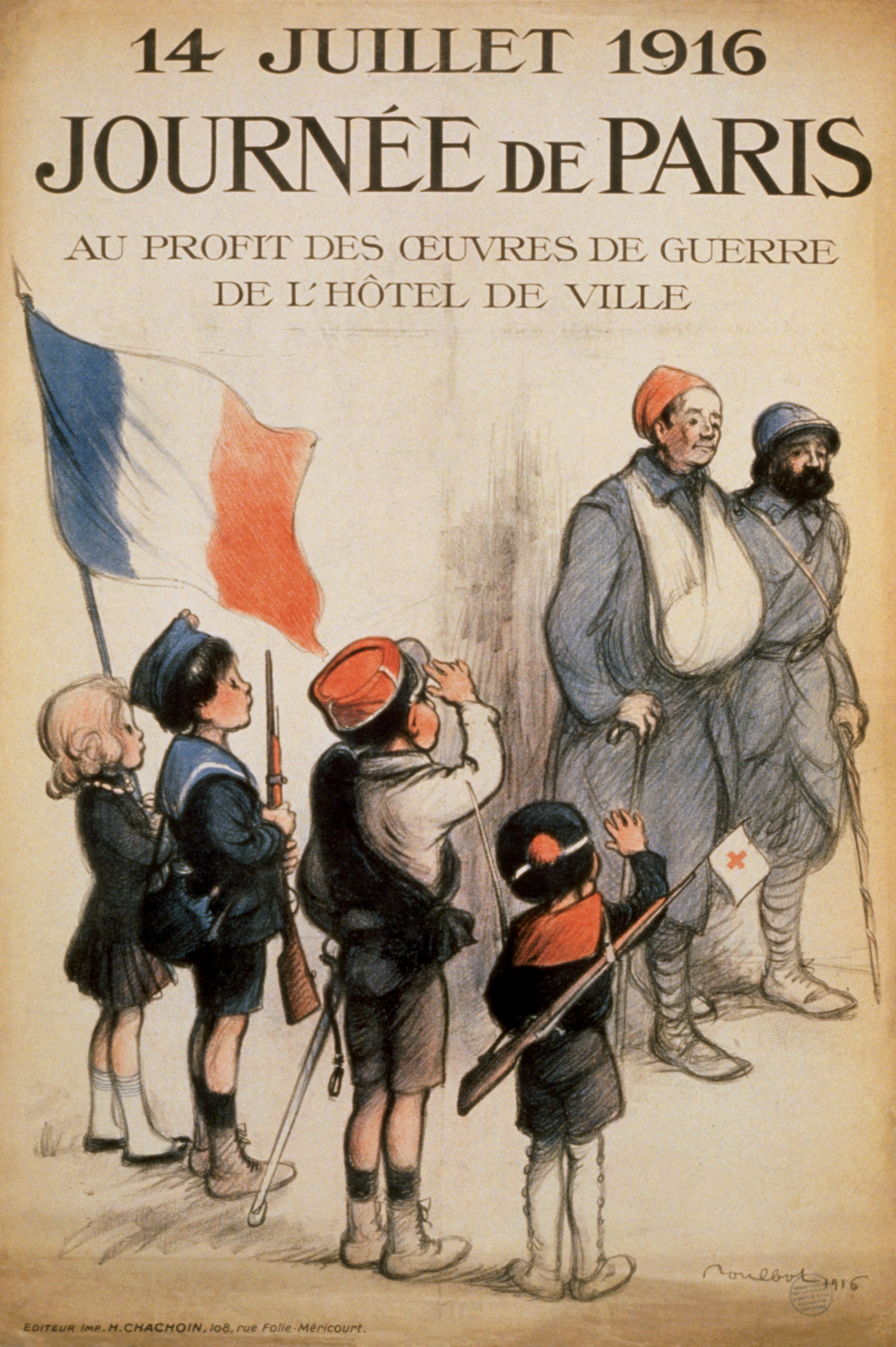
A poster from an event to raise funds for captured and wounded soldiers at the Hôtel de Ville (1916)

The Parisians gradually adjusted to the life of a city at war. Avenue de l'Allemagne was renamed Avenue Jean-Jaurés, and the Rue de Berlin became the Rue de Liège. The Grand Palais was converted to a military hospital. After a brief interruption, the theaters of Paris reopened, presenting plays with patriotic themes, and the cafés-concerts, which offered music, food and dancing, were crowded.

As it became evident that the war would be long, the government began to take over the system of food distribution in the city. A law of October 1915 allowed the state to requisition wheat and other grains at a price fixed by the government. In 1916, the controls were extended to milk, sugar and eggs. A Ministry of Food Supply was created in 1917 to better control the distribution, and to tax the food products to limit consumption. In May 1916, sugar was taxed at 1.3 francs per kilo, while margarine, which had largely replaced extremely-scarce butter, was taxed from 2.70 to 3.10 francs per kilo. A standard loaf of bread, called the pain national ("national bread"), was introduced on June 29, 1916; it was made with a more rustic flour than the traditional Parisian white loaf. Restrictions were tightened even further on February 25, 1917, with the requirement that only a single type of loaf of bread could be sold; it weighed seven hundred grams, was eighty centimeters long, and was sold twenty-four hours after it was baked. Special breads and brioches were forbidden. Other food staples were also rationed; the municipal council provided a ration of 135 grams of potatoes per day per person to poor families.

Reliable sources of electricity and heat for the city population was another urgent need; the major coal mines of northern France were to the north behind the German lines. The problem was especially urgent during the bitterly cold winter of 1916–17 (Turnip Winter, when temperatures fell to seven degrees below zero Celsius. The municipality reserved supplies of coal for the elderly, the unemployed, and the families of mobilized soldiers; they were permitted a fifty kilogram sack of coal every forty days for a payment of 4.75 francs. Shortages of coal also limited the generation of electricity, and sometimes the tram lines could not operate for lack of power.

As men were drafted into the army, women frequently took their place, first as teachers and ticket clerks on the metro and tramways, then for factory working. By 1916, they were driving streetcars; on June 1, 1917, the first women mail carriers began delivering letters in the 10th and 17th arrondissements. Parisian fashions were modified for the benefit of working women; skirts were made shorter, and corsets were made less tight. New words entered the French language: a factrice for a woman postman; a conductrice for a woman tram driver, and a munitionnette for a woman working in a munitions factory. The first business school for women, the École supérieure de commerce in Paris opened on December 2, 1915.

While the government stressed efficiency and the maximization of supplies for the army, the working class was largely committed to a traditional sense of consumer rights, whereby it was the duty of the government to provide the basic food, housing and fuel for the city. There was also a sense that hoarding and War profiteering were evils that citizens should organize to combat.

== Industrial Paris ==
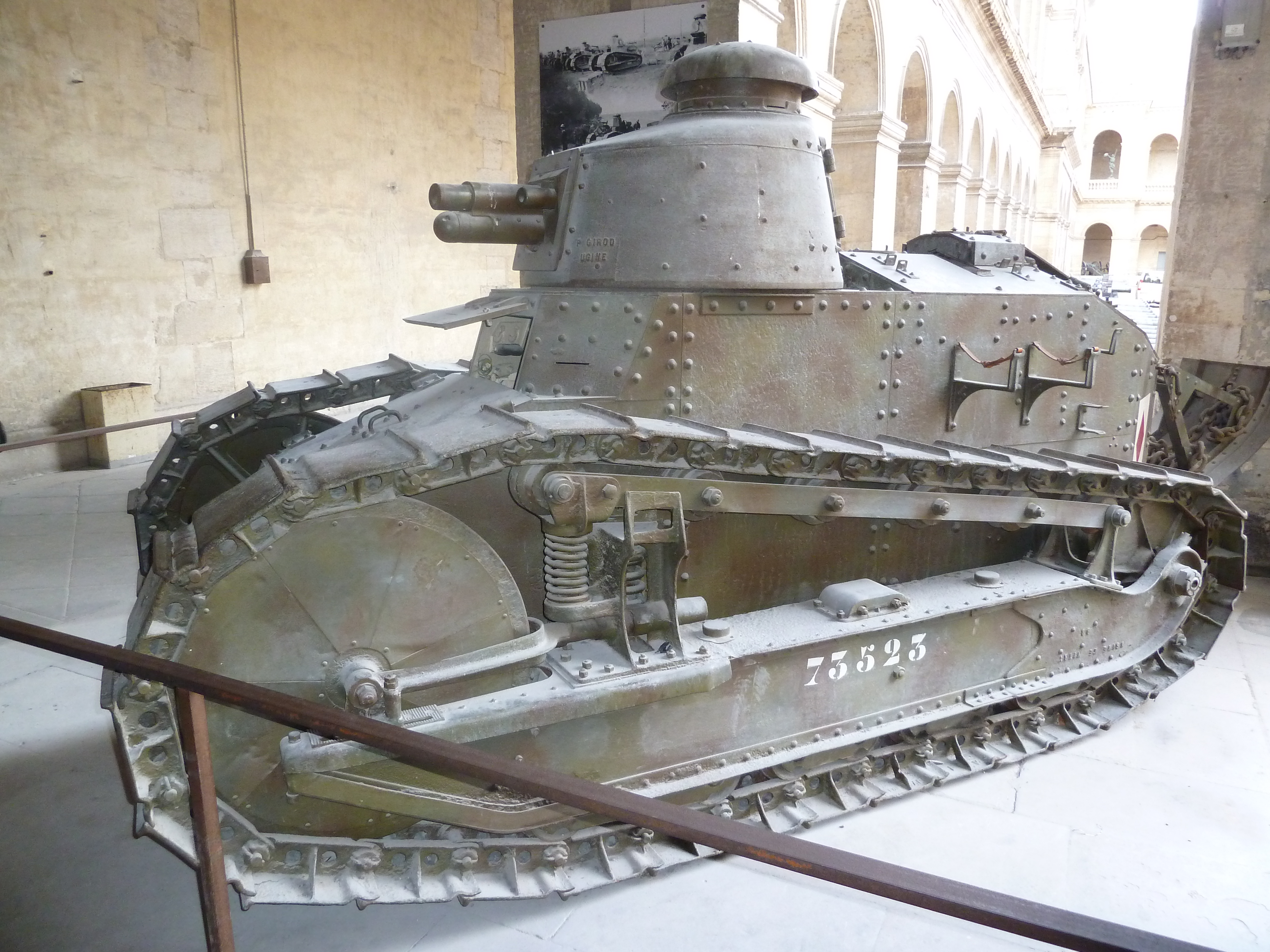
A Renault FT tank made at Boulogne-Billancourt (1917), now in the Army Museum in Paris.

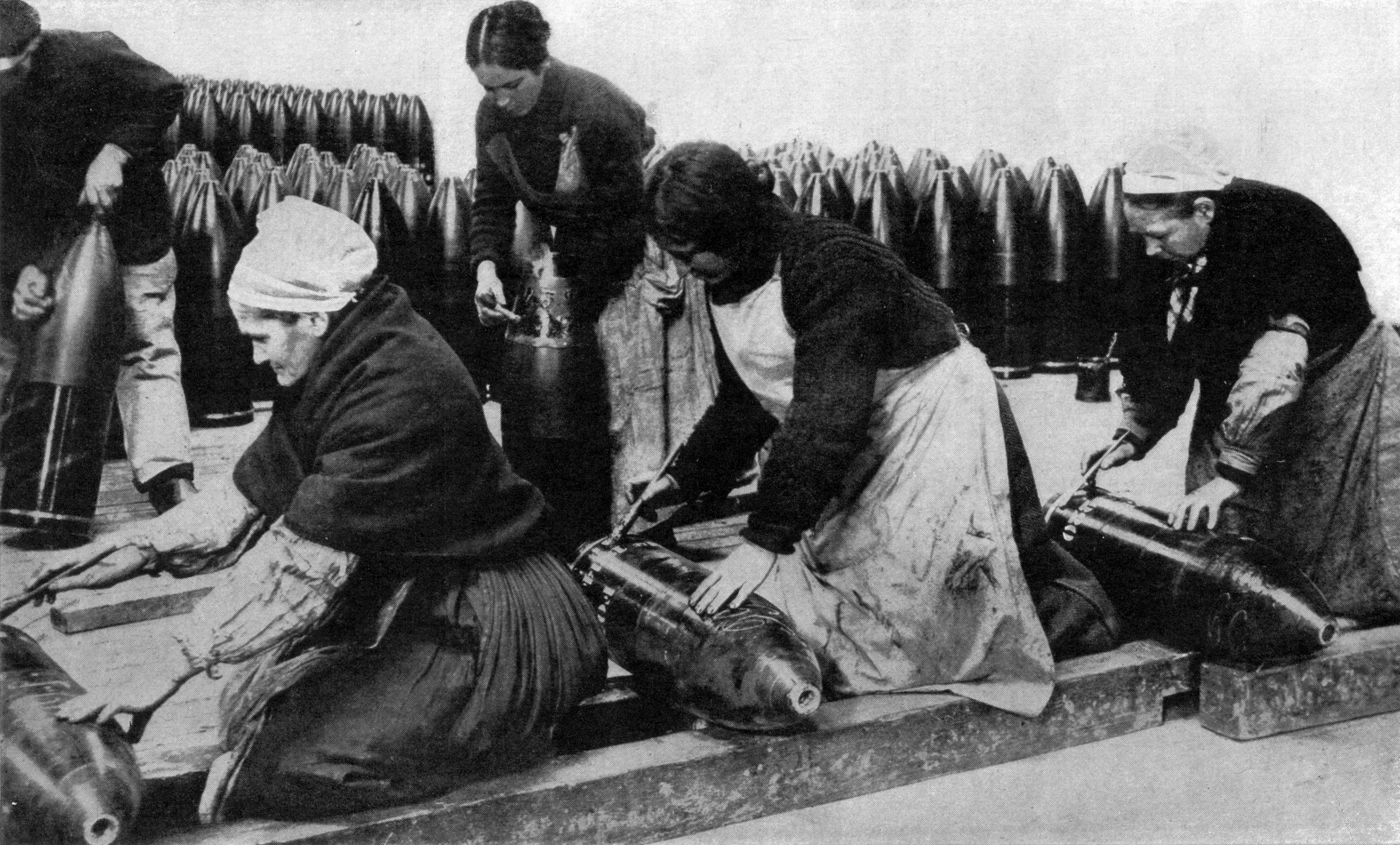
Munitionettes making artillery shells (1917)

Since coal mines and major industrial cities of the north were behind German lines, the government was forced to reorganize the industry of Paris to provide the enormous quantities of weapons and ammunition that the army needed. The munitions factories of Paris had to produce one hundred thousand 75-millimeter artillery shells every day, in addition to other munitions, cannon, rifles, trucks, ambulances, and aircraft, as well as building the machine tools and factory equipment needed to expand production. The effort was led by Albert Thomas, a socialist politician who became the Secretary of State for Artillery. In 1915, more than a thousand Paris enterprises were working in the sector of National Defense. Most of the defense factories were located in the outer neighborhoods of the city, particularly the 13th, 14th, 15th and 18th arrondissements. A large Citroen factory was built at Javel, and the Renault factory at Boulogne-Billancourt was converted from making automobiles to making a revolutionary new weapon, the tank. The aviation firm Blériot Aéronautique built an enormous aircraft factory in 1917 that covered 28,000 square meters at Suresnes. The traditional small workshops of French industry were re-organized into huge assembly lines following the model of factory of Henry Ford in the United States and the productivity studies of Frederick Taylor on scientific management.

As factory workers were drafted and sent to the front, their places were taken by women as well as 183,000 colonials from French Africa and Indochina who were closely watched by the government. On August 27, 1915, 1,700 Chinese workers arrived at the Gare de Lyon to take positions in the Renault tank factory and other defense works.

The work in the defense factories was intense and dangerous, as inexperienced workers handled dangerous chemicals and high explosives. On October 20, 1915, a workshop making hand grenades at 173 rue de Tolbiac exploded, killing about fifty workers and injuring a hundred. In April 1918, a new factory in Vincennes making shells and mustard gas exploded, poisoning 310 workers.

== Discontent and strikes ==
For the first three years of the war, all classes and political parties generally gave their support to the war effort and the soldiers at the front, a consensus referred to as the "union sacrée". However, in the spring of 1917, Paris workers began to demand more compensation for their efforts. The cost of living in Paris rose by 20 percent in 1915, 35 percent in 1916, and 120 percent between 1917 and the end of the war in November 1918. The salaries of factory workers increased only 75 percent during the same period, whereas the salaries of government employees rose by only 50 percent. Workers began to demand higher wages, better conditions for women workers, and an end to the importation of foreign workers.

The first strike, by two thousand women clothing workers, known as midinettes, began on May 15, 1917. They demanded a salary increase of one franc a day and a five-day week (referred to as an "English Week"). The strike spread to other trades, and ten thousand midinettes gathered outside the Labor Exchange. Negotiators from the clothing industry agreed to an increase of 75 centimes a day and a five-day week, but this concession was rejected by the association of employers. The midinettes marched to the National Assembly, and on May 23, the employers agreed to raise their wages by one franc a day and to give them a five-day week.

The success of the midinettes inspired workers in other industries; the women employees of the Printemps department store and the banks promptly went on strike. The strikes spread to florists, box makers, rubber workers, women serving in restaurants, laundry workers, the employees of the Kodak factory, and other enterprises. By May 29, the strike spread to the workers of the Orléans railway and the Gare d'Austerlitz, employees of the savings banks, and workers at the armaments factories of Salmson and Renault. Beginning on June 2, the strikes receded when the industries largely granted the demands. Some of the strike leaders were arrested and imprisoned for hindering the war effort.

== Espionage ==
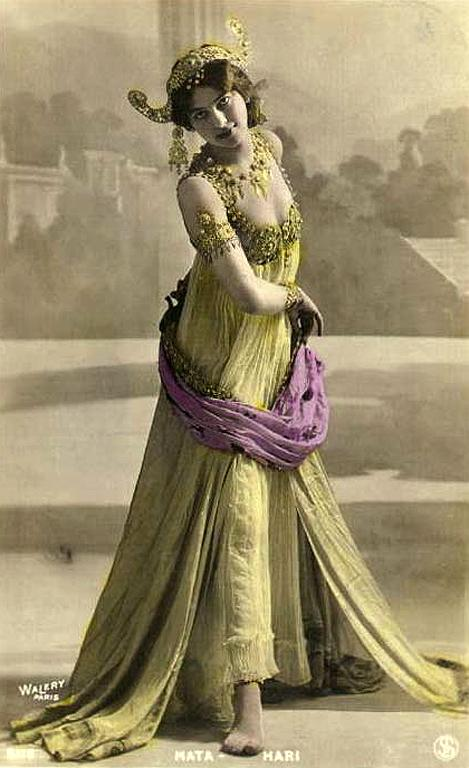
Mata Hari performing in Paris in 1906

As the command center of the French military and the French economy, Paris was a priority target for German espionage. The most famous spy was a Dutch citizen named Margarethe Zelle, better known as Mata Hari. Born in the Netherlands, she moved to Paris in 1903 and became first a circus horseback rider, then an exotic dancer, then a courtesan as the mistress of a prominent Lyon industrialist, Émile Étienne Guimet, the founder of the Musée Guimet of Asian art in Paris. When the war began, she became part of an espionage network directed from the German Embassy in Madrid, which she visited frequently. French intelligence suspected her because of her travels to Spain. They intercepted messages from the German Embassy in Madrid mentioning an agent H-21. By giving her false military information, the French were able to confirm that Mata Hari was H-21. She was arrested on February 13, 1917, at the Hotel Élysée Palace, then tried and convicted of espionage on July 24. At dawn on October 15, 1917, she was taken to the moat of the Château of Vincennes and executed by a firing squad.

== Art and culture ==
A Cubist costume designed by Pablo Picasso for Erik Satie's ballet Parade, first performed by the Ballets Russes at the Théâtre du Châtelet on May 18, 1917

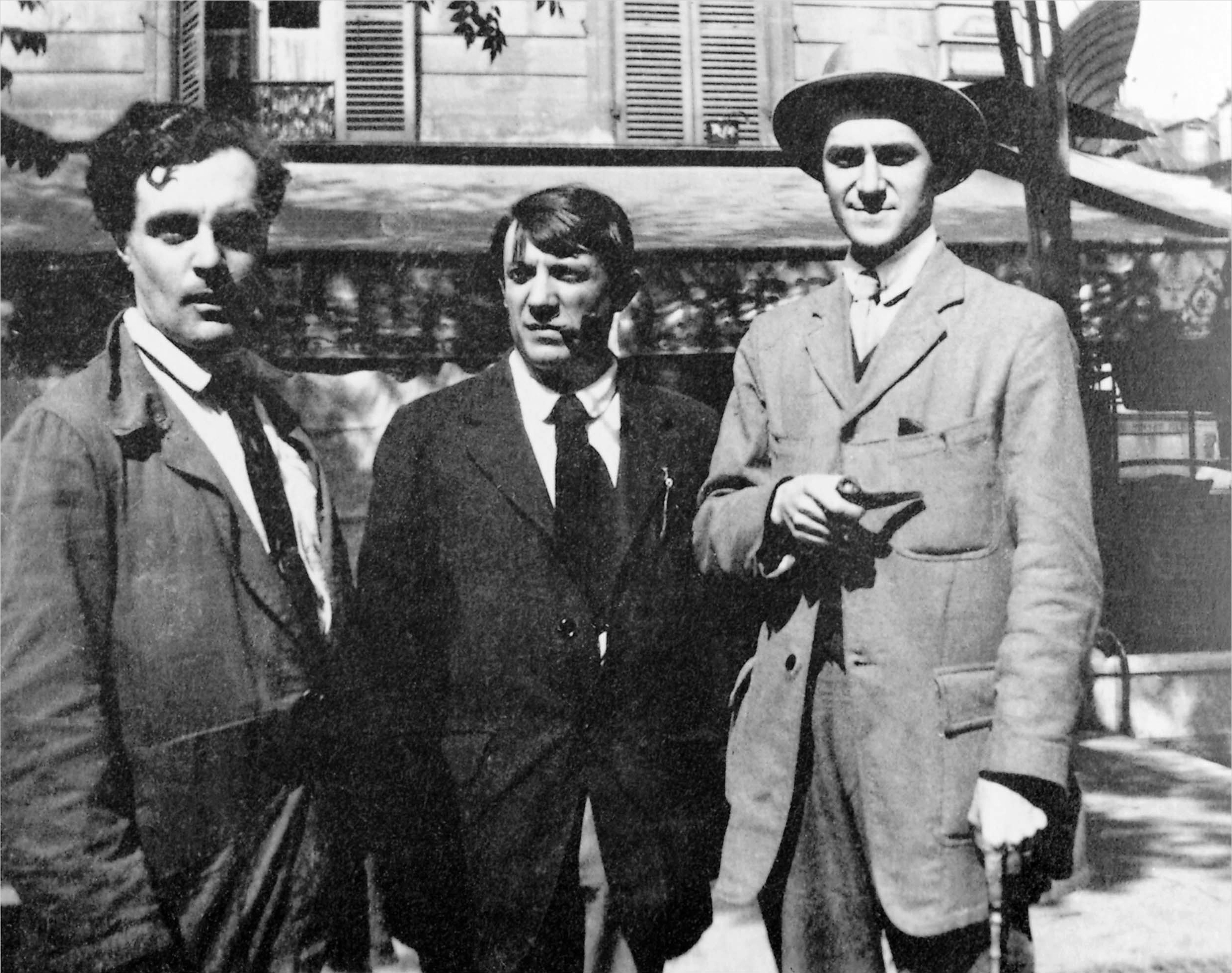
During the First World War, Montparnasse became the new fashionable gathering place in Paris for artists and writers (as a replacement for Montmartre). Jean Cocteau took this photograph of Amedeo Modigliani, Pablo Picasso and André Salmon in front of the café Le Dôme in 1916.

The war limited, but did not stop, the cultural output of the painters and artists of the city. The artistic center shifted from Montmartre to the neighborhood of Montparnasse, around the cafés Le Dôme, la Coupole, Rotonde, and le Select. Pablo Picasso, one of those who moved to Montparnasse, was not required to go into the army (as a citizen of neutral Spain), and he continued to experiment with the new style of Cubism. Henri Matisse continued to work at his studio on the Rue de Fleurus until he moved to Cimiez, near Nice, in 1917. Other artists who lived in Montparnasse included André Derain (who joined the army and served through the entire war); Juan Gris; Max Jacob; and Amedeo Modigliani.

Jean Cocteau served in the Red Cross as an ambulance driver. In Montparnasse, he met the poet Guillaume Apollinaire, artists Pablo Picasso and Amedeo Modigliani, and numerous other writers and artists with whom he later collaborated. The avant-garde dance troupe Les Ballets Russes was stranded in Paris thanks to the war and the Russian Revolution. The Russian impresario Sergei Diaghilev persuaded Cocteau to write a scenario for a ballet, which resulted in Parade in 1917. It was produced by Diaghilev with sets by Picasso and music by Erik Satie; it was first performed in Paris on May 18, 1917.

Marcel Proust, in fragile health, spent the war inside his house at 102 Boulevard Haussmann working on the second volume of his novel In Search of Lost Time.

Other Paris artists took part in the war; the poet Guillaume Apollinaire, for example, went into the army and was seriously wounded in 1916. While recovering in Paris, he wrote Les Mamelles de Tirésias and coined the word Surrealism in the program notes for Jean Cocteau and Erik Satie's ballet Parade. He also published an artistic manifesto, L'Esprit nouveau et les poètes. The war-weakened Apollinaire died of influenza during the Spanish flu pandemic of 1918 and was interred in the Père Lachaise Cemetery.

Both Claude Debussy and Maurice Ravel, the most prominent French composers of the 1910s, were deeply distressed by the events of World War I. Debussy was already quite ill at the start of the war and unable to contribute to the war effort. His last compositions were written in Paris before his death on March 25, 1918, only a half year before the war ended. Ravel attempted to enlist in the air force at the start of the war, but was found physically unfit and served instead as a truck driver. The most significant French composition written during World War I was Ravel's Le tombeau de Couperin, completed in 1917. In its original form as a piano suite (it was later orchestrated), each of the movements was dedicated to a French officer who lost his life in the war.

== Paris again on the front lines ==
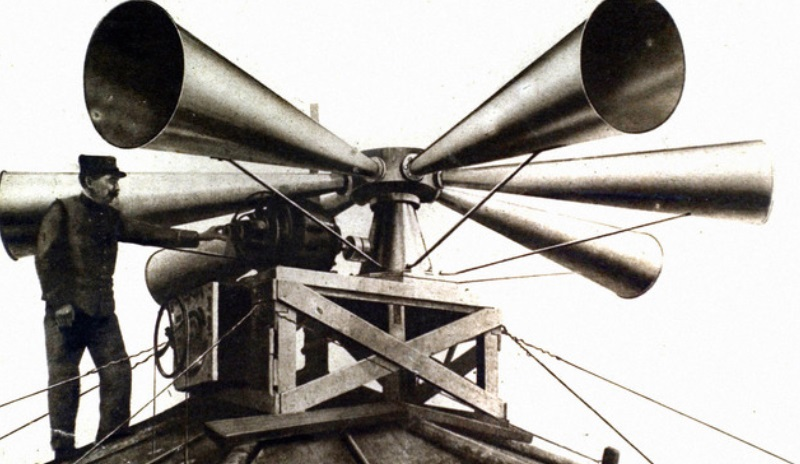
Gigantic sirens warn Paris of German Air Raids in June of 1918.jpg

By 1917, France was nearly exhausted by the war. On April 6, 1917, the Paris newspapers reported the welcome news that the United States, provoked by submarine attacks against U.S. ships, had declared war on Germany. The first American soldiers arrived on June 29, 1917, but their numbers were small, and it took nearly a year to train and prepare a large U.S. army. By the spring of 1918, ten thousand U.S. soldiers a month were arriving in France. The Treaty of Brest-Litovsk of March 1918 had taken Russia out of the war; Germany moved its armies west and launched a huge new offensive against France, hoping to end the war quickly before the Americans could change the balance of the war.

On 25 April 1917, mutinies broke out among soldiers at the front.

In November 1917, Georges Clemenceau of the Radical Party became the new prime minister of France. He had been a fierce opponent of the government and now became an even more fierce proponent of carrying the war to victory; his often repeated slogan was La Guerre jusqu'au bout ("War until the end".) He resided in an apartment on Rue Benjamin-Franklin and conducted the war not from the prime minister's traditional residence at the Hôtel Matignon, but from the Ministry of War on Rue Saint-Dominique. He made frequent visits to the front, close to the German lines, to encourage the ordinary soldiers.

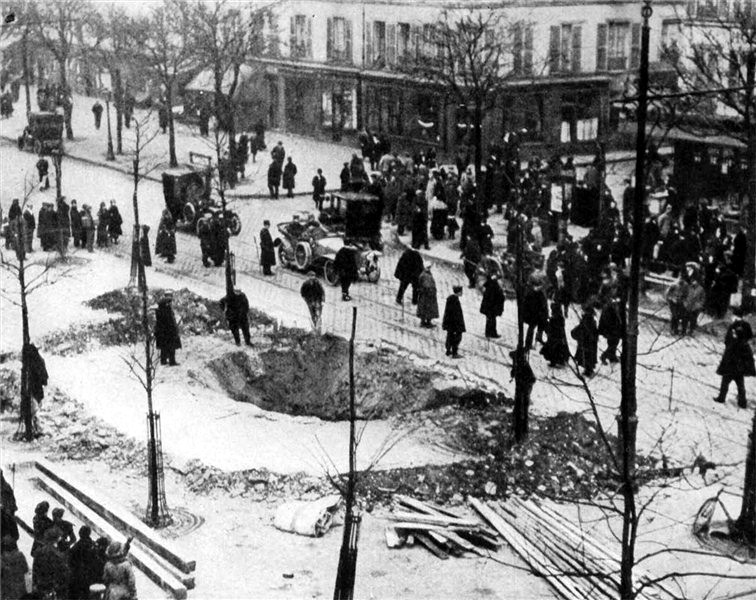
A bomb crater on a Paris street after a German Zeppelin raid (1917)

Paris once again became a target for German bombardment aimed at demoralizing the Parisians. On January 30, four squadrons of seven German Gotha bombers each appeared over the city and suburbs to drop two hundred bombs. There were more attacks on March 8 and March 11. The attacks took place at night, and Parisians took sanctuary in the Métro stations. During a new attack on the night of March 11–12, a panic took place in the crowded Bolivar Métro station that caused the deaths of seventy civilians.

On March 21, 1918, the Germans launched a major new offensive, hoping to end the war before the bulk of American forces arrived. They attacked through a gap between the British and French Armies and headed directly toward Paris. On March 23, the Germans introduced a new weapon to terrorize the Parisians: the long-ranged Paris Gun. It could fire shells 120 kilometers into the heart of the city. 303 huge shells were lobbed into the city. On March 29, 1918, one shell struck the Saint-Gervais church, killing 88 persons. 256 Parisians were killed and 629 were wounded by German shells.

Another enemy struck Paris in the spring of 1918, even deadlier than the German artillery: an epidemic of the Spanish influenza. At the peak of the epidemic, in October 1918, 1,769 Parisians died, including the writers Guillaume Apollinaire and Edmond Rostand.

By July 14, 1918, the new German offensive had reached Château-Thierry, only seventy kilometers from Paris. The city was put back under military government. The bombardments of the city intensified; works of art were once again evacuated from the Louvre; sandbags were placed around monuments; and the street lights were turned off at ten in the evening to hide the city from German night bombers. To resist the Germans more effectively, Clemenceau insisted that the French, British and American armies be under a single commander, Marshal Ferdinand Foch. Large numbers of American soldiers arrived in France every month, while German resources and manpower were nearly exhausted. The German offensive was turned back by an Allied counter-offensive on July 21, and the threat to Paris lifted again.

== The end of the War and celebration ==
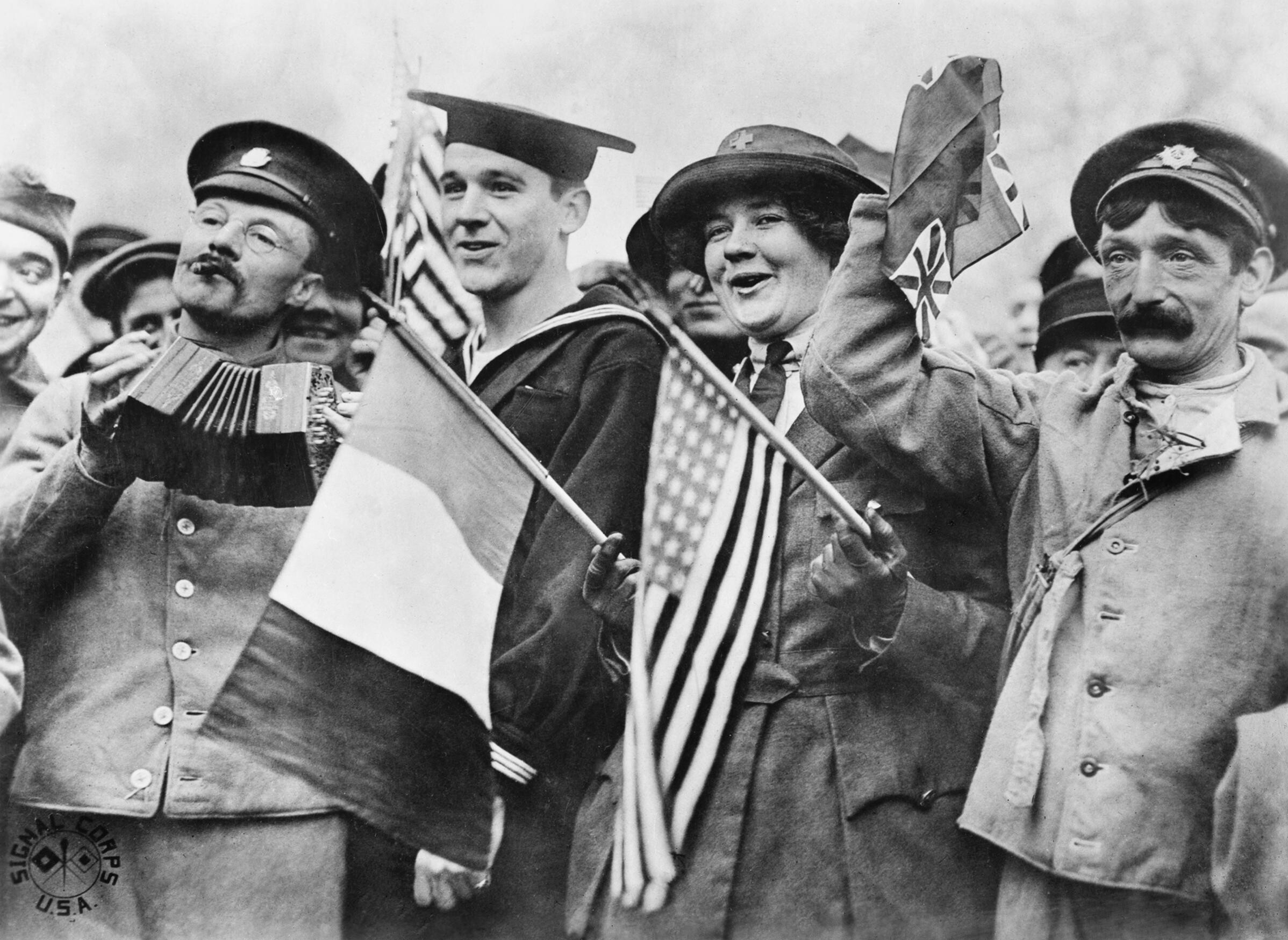
An American sailor in the crowd on the Place de la Concorde on Armistice Day, November 11, 1918

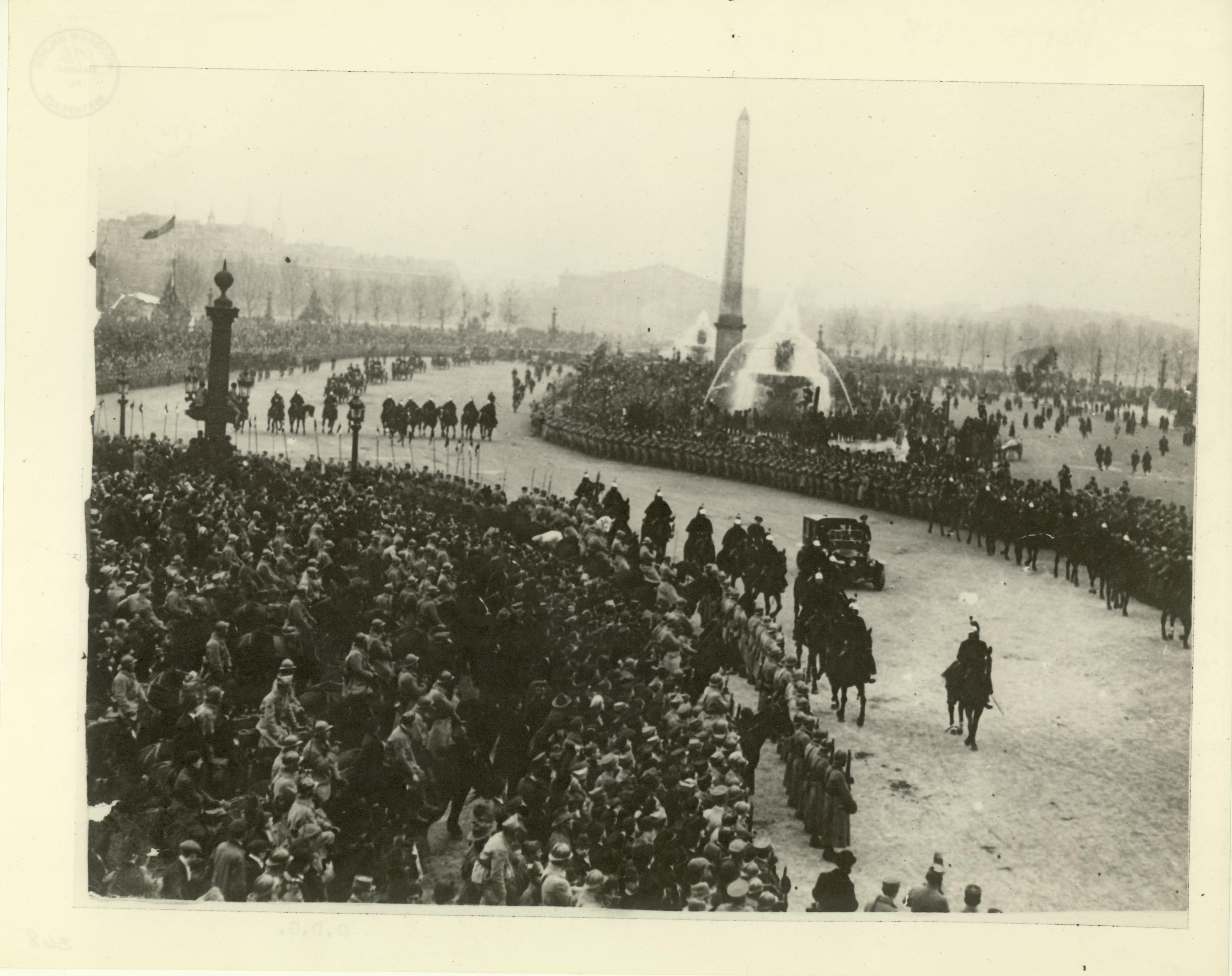
Parisians welcome President Woodrow Wilson (December 16, 1918)

By November, the Germans and their allies were unable to continue the war. The Austro-Hungarian monarchy collapsed on November 3, then the German monarchy on November 9. Germany was proclaimed a republic, and the German Emperor Wilhelm II fled to the Netherlands. The new German government sent a delegation to Compiègne, north of Paris, and the armistice was signed at 5:00 a.m. on November 11, 1918. The day was described by the French historian René Héron de Villefosse, who was a young student in a Paris college:

"At eleven o'clock, in the fog, the church bells announced the armistice. The college released its students class by class, and they rushed to the Champs-Élysées and the Place de la Concorde, where there were displays of trench mortars and small cannon recently captured from the enemy. The students of philosophy returned, dragging these trophies, including a captured flag, with them. In the afternoon, on the Grands Boulevards, the enthusiasm of the crowd was indescribable. People shouted, kissed, blew on trumpets, and blew the horns of trucks surrounded by the crowds. Any soldier encountered was embraced and carried in triumph. We poor students of rhetoric gave more kisses than we had exchanged during the entire past year. The lights came back on during the evening, and the buses began running again. . . We sang, we danced, and we made parades for days afterwards."

Equally enthusiastic crowds filled the Champs Élysées on 17 November to celebrate the return of Alsace and Lorraine to France. Huge crowds also welcomed President Woodrow Wilson to the Hôtel de Ville on 16 December 1918, when he arrived to take part in the peace negotiations at Versailles.

== Chronology ==
- 1914
  - 28 June - Assassination of Archduke Franz Ferdinand of Austria by Serbian nationalists in Sarajevo, the catalyst for the beginning of World War I.
  - 28 July - A declaration of war on Serbia by Austria-Hungary marks the beginning of World War I.
  - 31 July – Jean Jaurès, leader of the French socialists, assassinated by a mentally-disturbed man in the Café du Croissant on the Rue du Croissant in Montmartre.
  - 1 August – Mobilization of French Army reservists.
  - 3 August – Germany declares war on France.
  - 29 August - The French government and National Assembly depart Paris for Bordeaux.
  - September 6–9 – The army requisitions 600-1000 Paris taxis to transport 6000 soldiers 50 kilometers to the front lines in the First Battle of the Marne.
  - December 9 – The government and National Assembly return to Paris.
  - El Ajedrecista automaton introduced at the University of Paris.
- 1915
  - 10 September – the Satirical magazine Canard enchaîné begins publication.
  - 30 October – Official prices of food are posted on the doorways of public schools to deter profiteering.
- 1916
  - 20 January – Frozen meat goes on sale in two Paris butcher shops.
  - 27 August – 1,700 Chinese workers arrive at the Gare de Lyon to work in Paris armaments factories, replacing men mobilized into the army.
  - 15 December – The first woman conductor is hired for the Paris tramways.
  - The Renault factory at Boulogne-Billancourt begins manufacturing the first French tanks.
- 1917
  - 9 February – Shortage of coal and grain. Bakers are permitted to sell only one kind of bread, to be sold the day after it is baked.
  - 15 May – Wave of strikes in Paris workshops and factories with workers' demands for a five-day week and an extra franc a day to compensate for higher prices. Most demands are granted.
  - 1 September – Rationing of coal begins.
  - 25 November – Seats are reserved on Paris public transportation for the blind and those wounded in the war.
  - 15 October – Execution by firing squad of the Dutch native Mata Hari, a spy for the Germans, in the moat of the Château de Vincennes.
- 1918

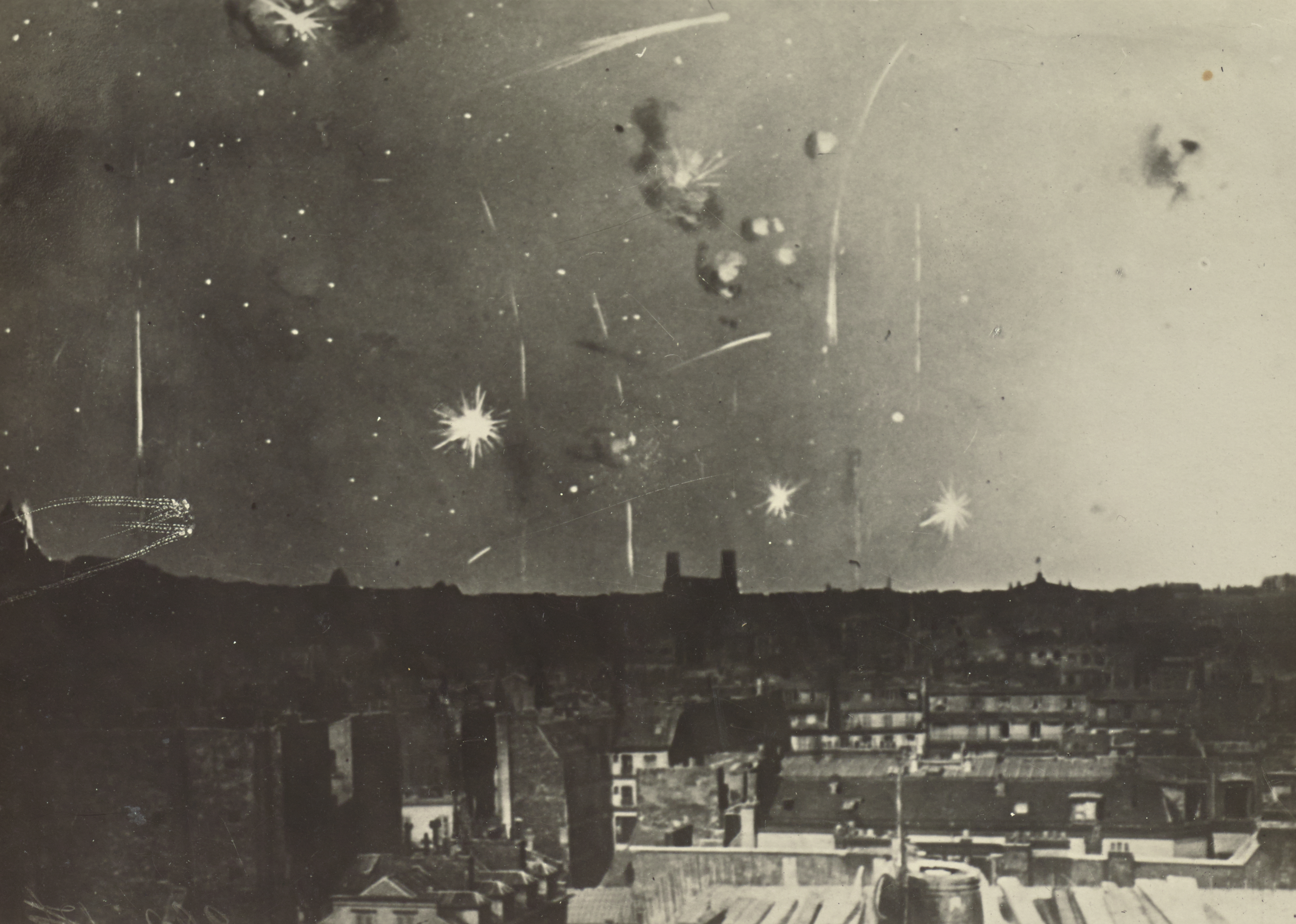
Dark sky with bombs exploding over dark low buildings. This is probably the bombing of Paris in January, 1918.

  - 29 January – Rationing of bread is imposed; a card allows three hundred grams per day per person.
  - 30 January – Night bombing raid by twenty-eight German aircraft kills 65 persons and injures 200. Further raids take place on March 8 and 11.
  - 11 March – German bombing raid causes a panic in the Bolivar Métro station, killing 71 persons.
  - 23 March – German long-range artillery (the Paris Gun) fires 18 shells into Paris from 120 km away, killing 15 and wounding 69. The shelling continues until 16 September.
  - 29 March – a German shell hits the Saint-Gervais church during mass, killing 82 persons and injuring 69.
  - October – Epidemic of Spanish influenza, which began at the start of the year, kills 1,778 persons in one week.
  - 11 November – Signing of armistice ends the war. Victory celebrations on the Champs-Élysées.
  - 16 December – U.S. President Woodrow Wilson addresses crowds at the Hôtel-de-Ville.

== In French ==
- Combeau, Yvan (2013). Histoire de Paris. Paris: Presses Universitaires de France. ISBN 978-2-13-060852-3.
- Fierro, Alfred (1996). Histoire et dictionnaire de Paris. Robert Laffont. ISBN 978-2-221-07862-4.
- Héron de Villefosse, René (1959). Histoire de Paris. Bernard Grasset.
- Le Roux, Thomas (2013). Les Paris de l'industrie 1750–1920. CREASPHIS Editions. ISBN 978-2-35428-079-6.
- Marchand, Bernard (1993). Paris, histoire d'une ville (XIX-XX siecle). Éditions du Seuil. ISBN 978-2-02-012864-3.
- Sarmant, Thierry (2012). Histoire de Paris: Politique, urbanisme, civilisation. Editions Jean-Paul Gisserot. ISBN 978-2-755-803303.
- Ayala, Roselyne de, ed. (2013). Dictionnaire historique de Paris (in French). Paris: Librairie générale française. ISBN 978-2-253-13140-3.
- Petit Robert - Dictionnaire universal des noms propres. Le Robert. 1988.
