= Le Bonnet rouge =

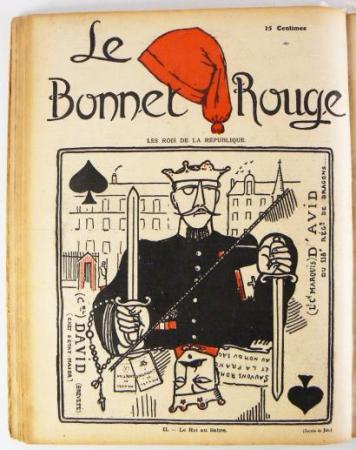
Le Bonnet Rouge, 1914. "The Kings of the Republic".

Le Bonnet Rouge was as an anarchist French newspaper published from 1913 to 1922. Le Bonnet Rouge defended the Franco-German rapprochement.

The newspaper's administrator, Émile-Joseph Duval, was arrested, tried and executed on 7 August 1917 over allegations of complicity with the enemy, Germany, in the midst of World War I.
