= Café du Croissant =

Café in Paris, France

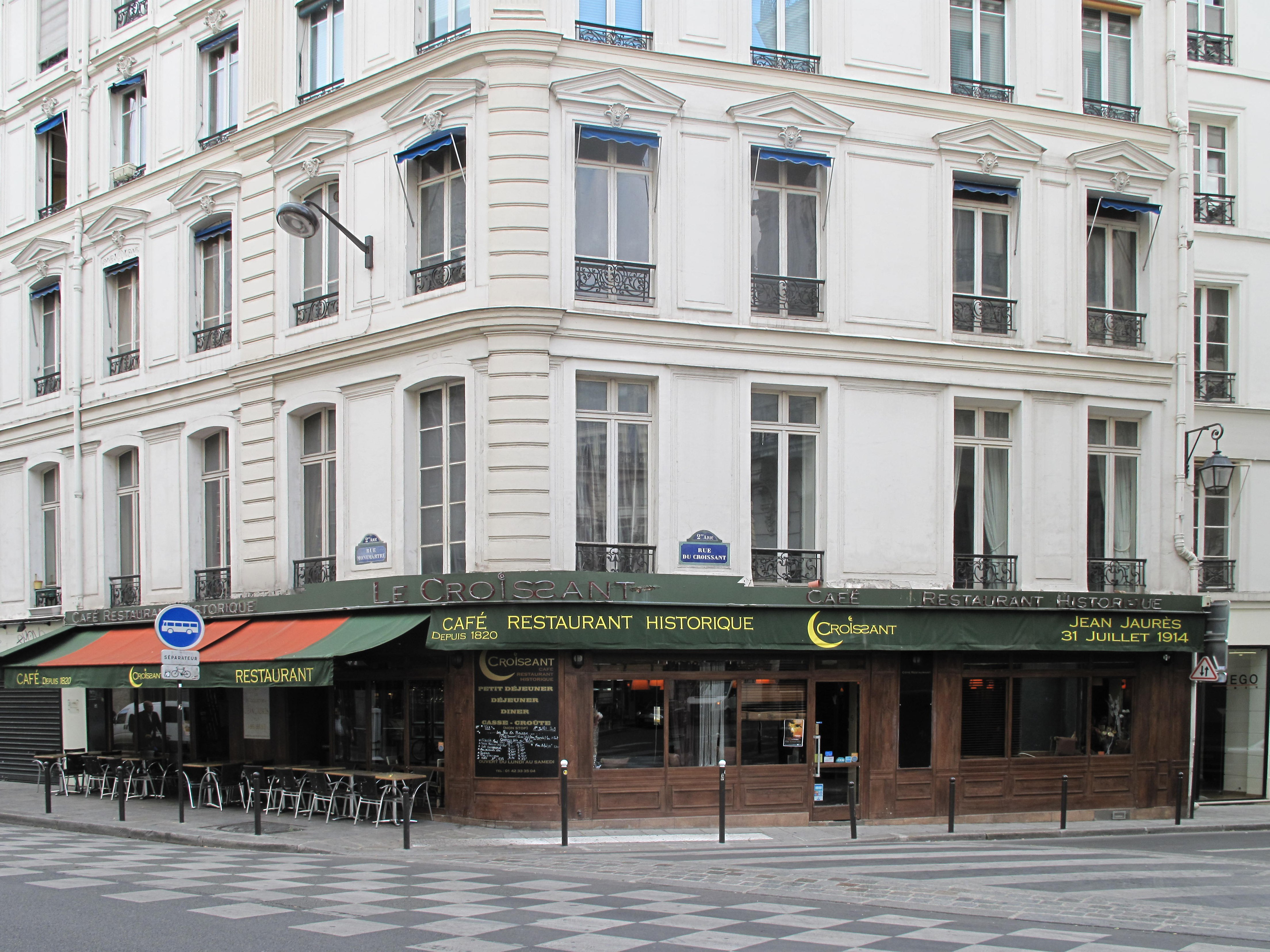

- Location within Paris

Restaurant information
- Location: 146 rue Montmartre–22 rue du Croissant; 2nd arrondissement of Paris
- Coordinates: 48°52′09″N 2°20′35.8″E

The Café du Croissant or Crosse du Croisant (today the Taverne du Croissant) is a café in the 2nd arrondissement of Paris, France. It is famous for having been the place of the assassination of Jean Jaurès by Raoul Villain on 31 July 1914.

On 20 February 1938 the owner, Albert Wiedmer, donated the marble plaque of the table on which Jaurès was assassinated to the municipality of Champigny-sur-Marne at the request of the city's mayor Albert Thomas, a friend of Jaurès. It was classified as a Historic Monument object in 1988. Yet the waiters still have the patrons believe the café has kept the original table with a dark stain on a brighter wood that is said to be Jaurès's blood.

The assassination is still remembered in the café: in 1923, a commemorative plaque was added to the façade by the Human Rights League; a red and golden floor mosaic shows the date of Jaurès's death and the exact place where he fell. Additionally, a window shelters a part of Jaurès's chair, his hat with a bullet inside, and the two front pages of the newspaper L'Humanité of 31 July and 1 August 1914.

On 31 July 1984 President François Mitterrand visited the Café du Croissant to commemorate the 70th anniversary of the assassination. In a radio show, he told that in 1934 he had rushed to the café to pay tribute to Jaurès.

The establishment was re-opened in 2011 as the Taverne du Croissant. On 31 July 2014 President François Hollande and Germany's Vice-Chancellor Sigmar Gabriel visited the café upon the centenary of the assassination of Jaurès. The restaurant offered a special dinner menu for the centenary.

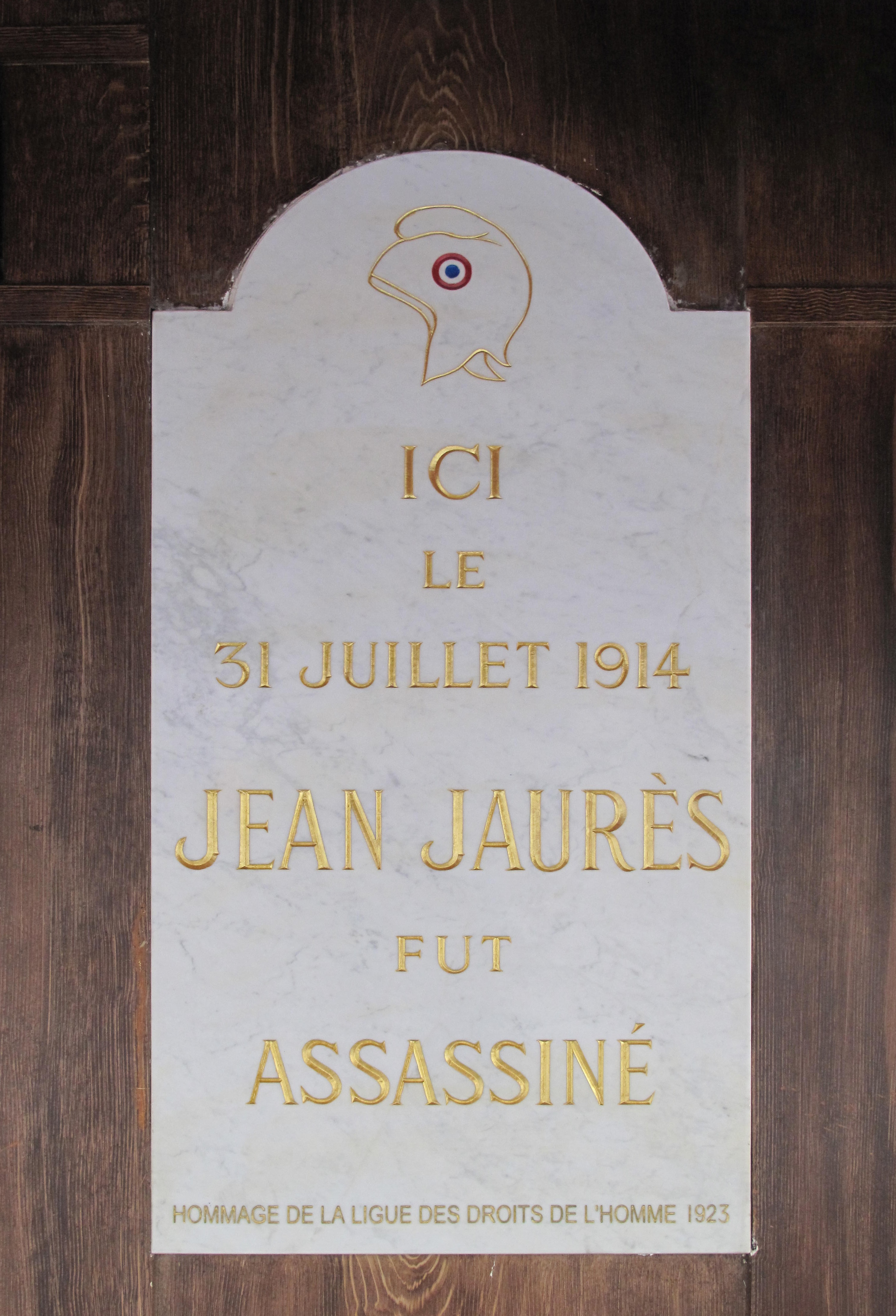
The commemorative plaque added by the Human Rights League on the façade.
