= Raoul Villain =

French nationalist; assassinator of French socialist leader Jean Jaurès in 1914

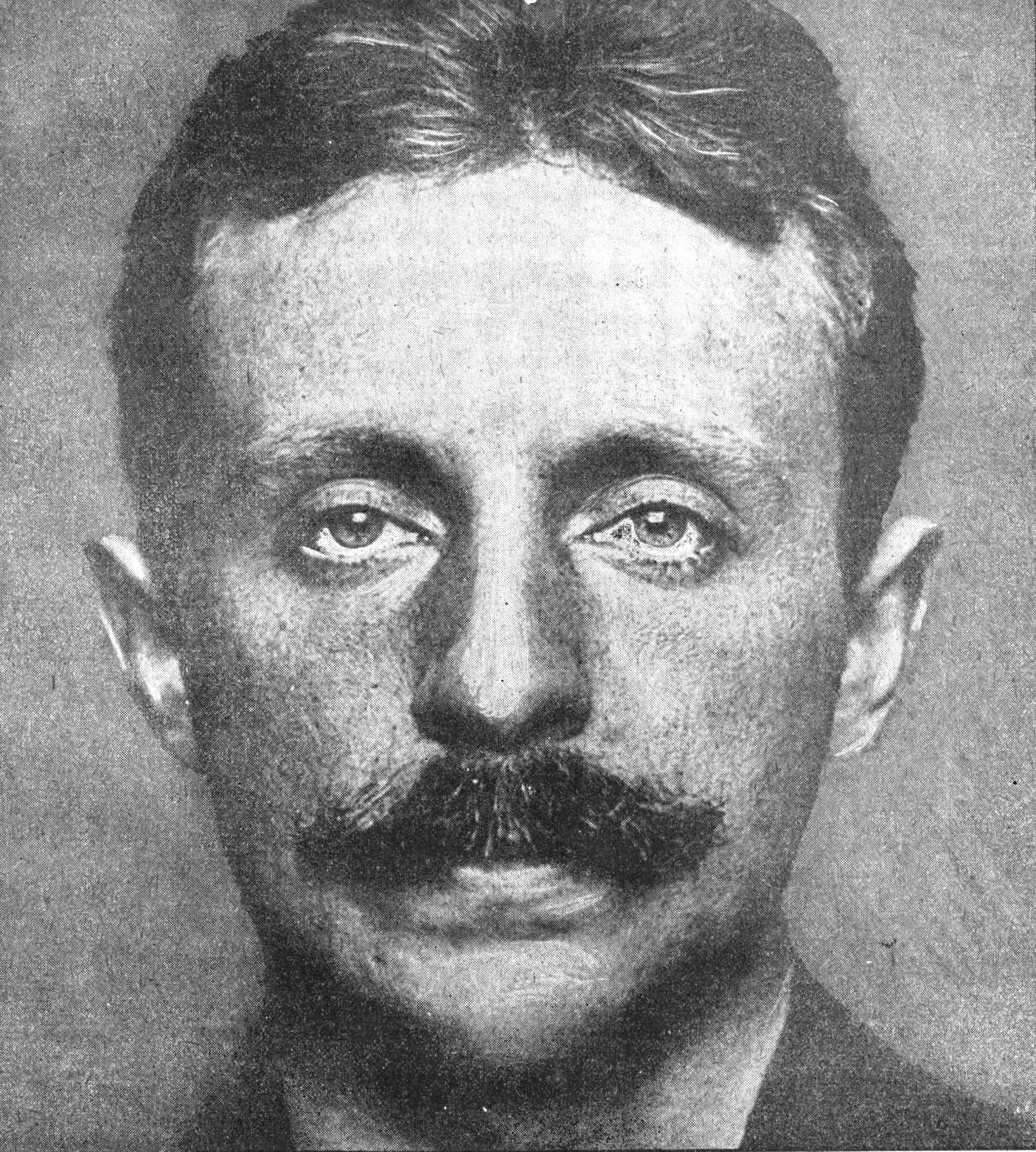
Raoul Villain

Raoul Villain (19 September 1885 – 17 September 1936) was a French nationalist. He is primarily remembered for his assassination of French socialist leader Jean Jaurès on 31 July 1914, in Paris. Villain was acquitted by a jury of peers in 1919 and later fled to the Balearic island of Ibiza, where he was killed during the first stages of the Spanish Civil War.

== Early life and background ==
Villain was born in Reims, Marne, France on 19 September 1885. As a 29-year-old student in archeology at the École du Louvre, he was a member of the Ligue des jeunes amis de l'Alsace-Lorraine ("League of Young Friends of Alsace-Lorraine"), a nationalist student group.

After France's defeat in the Franco-Prussian War, the French provinces of Alsace and Lorraine were annexed by Germany. This was a source of anger and resentment in France, causing many to feel that a new war with Germany was in order to recover both territories and French pride. Therefore, many like Villain were opposed to the pacifist policies of Jean Jaurès. Villain lived for some time in England, at Loughton, where he stayed with Mrs Annie Francis, who described him, according to The Observer on 6 June 1915, as "a gentle and very kind man".

== Attack on Jaurès and result ==
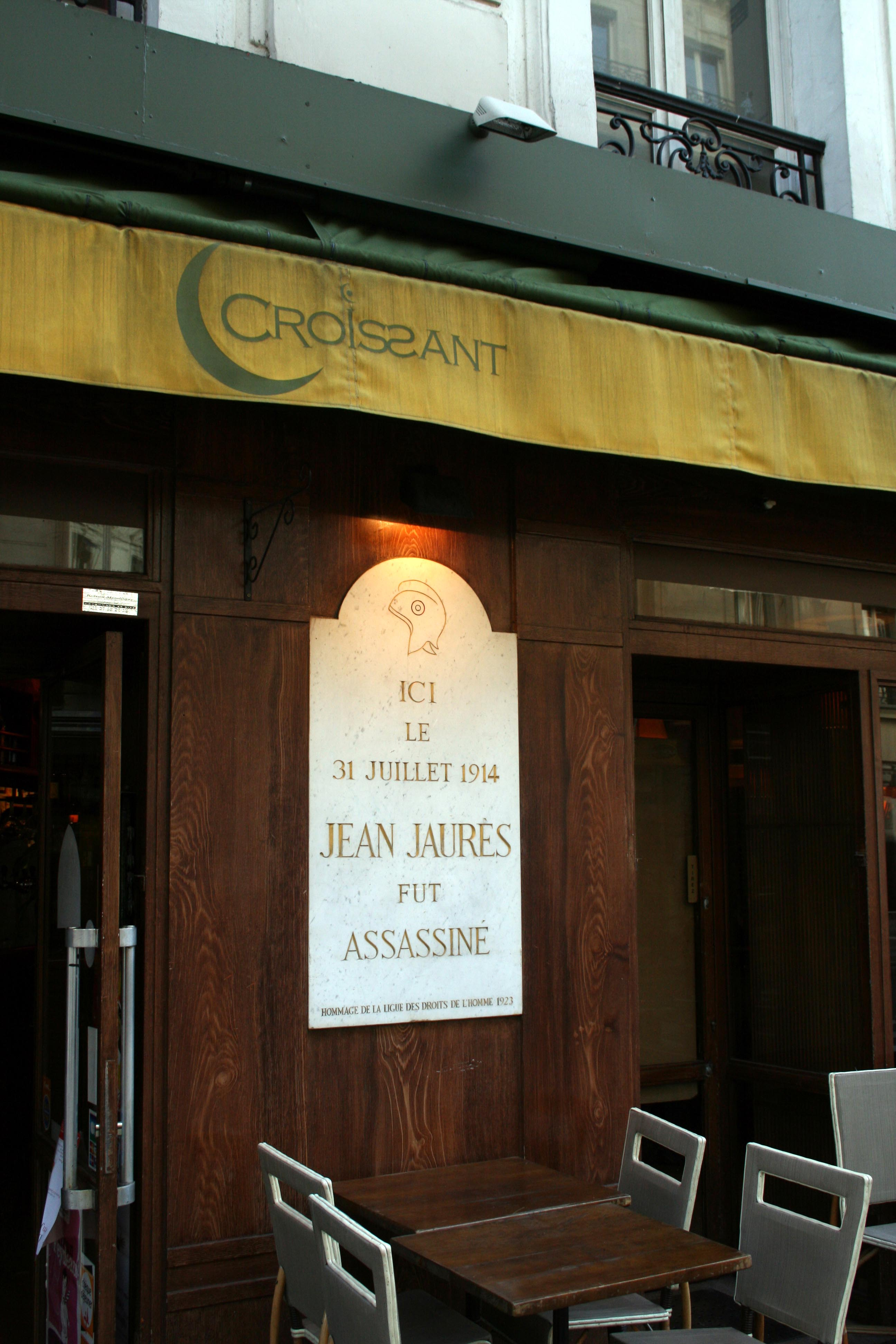
The still existing Café du Croissant which was located next to Jaurès's newspaper L'Humanité (photo by Rémi Jouan)

Villain focused on Jaurès, bought a revolver and began stalking him, scribbling incoherent notes about the socialist leader's habits into his pocket-book. At about 21:40 on Friday, 31 July 1914, Villain fired two bullets through a window embrasure into Jaurès' head while his victim was having supper with his contributors in Le Croissant at the corner of Rue Montmartre and Rue du Croissant.

The next day, posters went up all over France announcing the general mobilization, and war was declared three days after Jaurès's death. What would be World War I began.

Incarcerated for the duration of the war, Villain was brought to trial in 1919. He was acquitted by a jury of peers on 29 March 1919, and Anatole France wrote in L'Humanité: "Workers! ... A monstrous verdict proclaims that the assassination of Jaurès is not a crime...". Jaurès's wife, as plaintiff, was ordered to pay the court costs.

== After being acquitted ==
After having briefly been arrested in 1920 in Paris after trying to pass some false currency, Villain fled to Cala de Sant Vicent, Ibiza in the Balearic Islands off Spain. Receiving some money through an inheritance, he fled France and arrived in Ibiza. Villain thought that, by hiding out in the remote northeastern corner of Ibiza, he could live anonymously and be forgotten. In 1933, the Bay of Cala de San Vicent was a very quiet backwater with no development; there was not even a road into the valley. Villain decided to make his home there. Using local labour and help from Paul René Gauguin, the grandson of Paul Gauguin, he built a house from concrete and had almost finished the building by August 1936.

On 13 September, a small detachment of soldiers arrived on the beach of Cala de San Vicent by rowboat. Eyewitnesses reported that they thought that they may have been anarchists of the FAI. These soldiers were part of a larger detachment. The force had arrived on the island to re-secure it following the mini-coup which had been orchestrated by the Nationalists under the command of Infantry Commander Juli Mestre. Villain had been away visiting a French woman in Santa Eulària des Riu when the soldiers arrived, but quickly returned home when he heard of their arrival. Feeling vulnerable, he feared that the soldiers would steal his valuables, which he had stashed in the unfinished house. Despite being repeatedly warned by his neighbours not to go back down to the cove, he still went home.

== Death ==
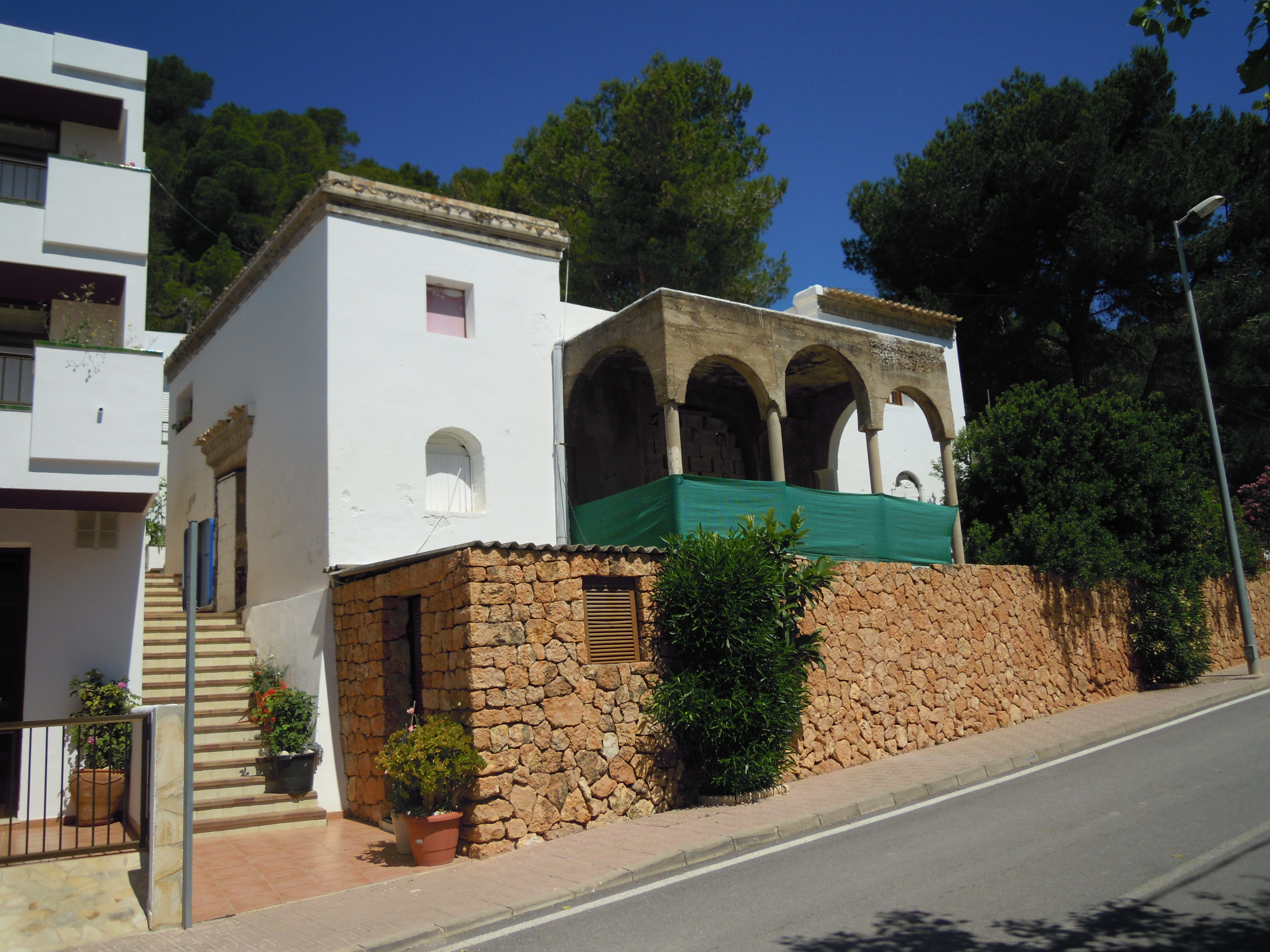
The House of Raoul Villain in Bay of Cala de San Vicent as it stands in 2013

The officer and troops who arrived on the beach that day seemed very suspicious of this Frenchman, who also antagonised the officer with his explanation of why he had set a crucifix on the hill behind his house. Apart from this outward show of religious zeal, the officer was also suspicious of where Villain had been that day, and decided to confine him to his house. He was considered to be a fascist and a spy and, as such, a threat to their plans to reoccupy the island.

On the afternoon of 17 September 1936, three bombers from the Italian Air Force had flown along the coast over Cala de Sant Vicent and bombed the town of Ibiza, which could be heard even that far up the coast. It is thought that the troops, on hearing the sounds of the attack, decided to return to the capital and tried to take Villain and his valuables with them. He reacted violently to this, and as a consequence was shot in the back, with the bullet exiting via his throat. Villain had only been wounded, but the officer in charge warned the villagers that had come down to see what had happened, not to assist or disturb him. Villain lay alone on the sand for two days until he died. The locals then placed his body in a makeshift coffin, draped it in a French Tricolour they found in his house, and buried him in the cemetery at nearby Sant Vicent de sa Cala.

== Sources ==
- Combes, A. "Casimir Combes (la guerre de 1914)"
