= Alfred Gaulier =

French journalist and politician (1829–1898)

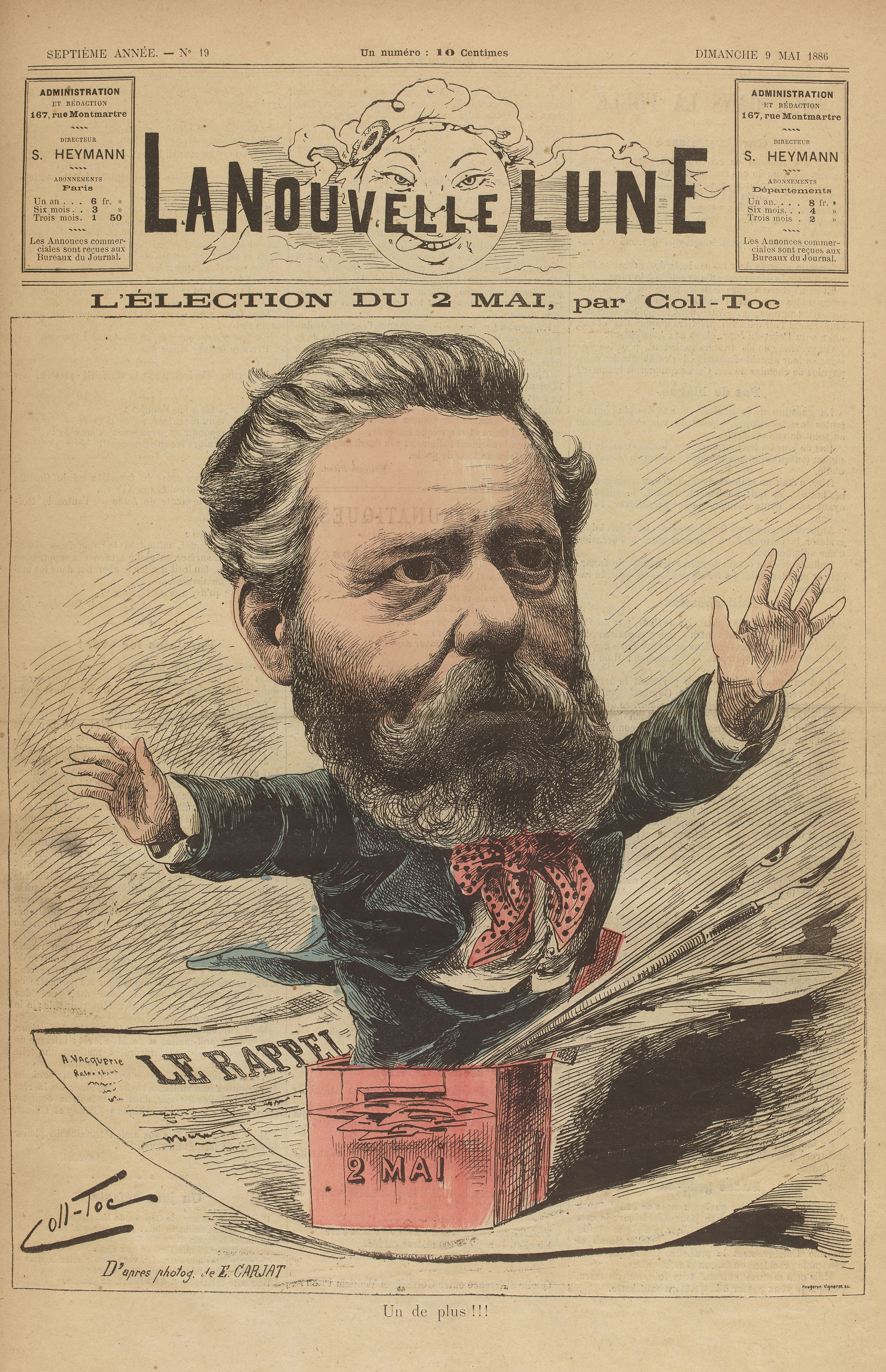
- Gaulier by Étienne Carjat from La Nouvelle Lune, 9 May 1886

Deputy for Seine
- In office 2 May 1886 – 11 November 1889

Personal details
- Born: Alfred Nicolas Gaulier; 10 November 1829 Paris, France
- Died: 17 January 1898 (aged 68) Paris, France
- Occupation: Journalist, politician

Alfred Gaulier (10 November 1829 – 17 January 1898) was a French journalist and politician. His father was a cavalry officer and he seemed destined for a military career. At the time of the coup that brought Napoleon III to power he was a sub-lieutenant in the infantry. He signed a document voting against the coup, and was forced to resign. After a difficult period, he found work as a journalist throughout the remainder of the Second French Empire and the early years of the French Third Republic. He was a radical republican, and was elected deputy for the Seine department from 1886 to 1889.

== Early years ==
Alfred Nicolas Gaulier was born on 10 November 1829 in Paris. His parents were Jean-Baptiste Gaulier (b. 1772), retired cavalry squadron leader, Knight of Saint-Louis and Officer of the Legion of Honour, and Anne Antoinette Gouget (b. 1802). His grandfather, René Gaulier, was a carpenter. His father had participated in most of the campaigns of the French First Republic and First French Empire, and had been decorated at Jena. Alfred Gaulier was educated at the Prytanée National Militaire in La Flèche, a preparatory school for boys planning a military career.

In 1847 Gaulier was made a sub-lieutenant of the 49th infantry line regiment. He was admitted to the École spéciale militaire de Saint-Cyr in 1848. He was a second lieutenant in the 53rd line infantry regiment at the time of the coup d'état of 2 December 1851. He was one of the few officers, and the only one in the Paris garrison, who signed their name to a vote against the coup. He was brought before a board of inquiry for habitual misconduct and lack of honour, and Marshal Bernard Pierre Magnan suspended him from employment. As a result, he was forced to resign from the army.

== Journalist ==
Gaulier moved to Paris and struggled to make a living in the early years of the Second French Empire. He became a journalist and was soon established with the democratic press. He married and had one child. He was a contributor to L'Intérêt public in 1867. One of his articles in L'Intérêt Public earned him punishment from the Correctional Police. He was a copy editor at L'Électeur libre, and editor at Actionnaires and Le Temps (1867). During the electoral assemblies of May 1869 Gaulier noted in Le Temps that if a crowd formed the police were as much responsible as the organizers,

Then let policemen gather, all alone, as yesterday evening on Boulevard Sébastopol. Towards eleven o'clock we noted that there was at least, one policeman for every three promenaders, and of these three promenaders, at least two were attracted by the presence of the policemen, grouped in gloomy groups at street corners. This is a singular way to reassure, one must admit, but an almost infallible way to create gatherings.

During the Paris Commune (28 March – 28 May 1871) Gaulier was Editor in Chief at La Discussion (12–16 May 1871). He was owner, manager and editor in chief of the ephemeral La Politique (17 May – 1 June 1871). La Politique, the organ of the Paris League of Rights, was first suppressed by the Commune and then by the Versaille government, whose excesses he condemned. He was parliamentary editor to Le Rappel (1871–1886). He succeeded Camille Pelletan in this position. He also contributed to La République française.

== Political career ==
Gaulier's short political career began after Ernest Roche was sentenced to 15 months imprisonment for participating in the organization of 1886 miner's strikes in Anzin. Henri Rochefort resigned from his seat as a deputy, triggering a by-election in which the socialists combined to nominate Roche as their candidate. Georges Clemenceau decided not to support Roche, and instead sponsored Alfred Gaulier as the Radical candidate. He was supported by the radical press. Gaulier was elected Deputy for Seine on 2 May 1886. Roche received over 100,000 votes, but Gaulier won the election with 146,000 votes, while small numbers of votes went to candidates such as M. Soubrié, supported by the Possibilists. According to The Living Age,

M. Roche and M. Duc-Quercy were arrested on the charge of having wittingly disseminated false information for the purpose of stirring up the workmen. Alter a scandalous trial, in the course of which M. Laguerre, a deputy, and the reporter of the Budget for Justice, insulted the procurator of the republic in open court, the accused were sentenced to fifteen months' imprisonment. The initial result of the sentence was to make M. Roche a candidate at the Parliamentary election of the 2nd of May; and the government was summoned to release him from prison in order that he might appear on the hustings. The government showed its usual want of resolution. It sent a magistrate to entreat the prisoner to take the necessary steps in order to his being thus provisionally set at liberty. The election gave melancholy proof of the level to which universal suffrage has fallen in the capital. No respectable candidate, no one of any sort of standing. ventured to present himself; and the contest was limited to two journalists of the twelfth rank, and of almost equally extravagant opinions, M. Gaulier and M. Roche. M. Gaulier was elected ...

Gaulier sat with the Radical Left group. On 7 June 1886 his confirmation hearings led to a debate on his character. The newspapers L'Intransigeant and Cri du peuple had accused him of having been dismissed from the army for offenses against honour. He said he had freely resigned after voting against the coup d'état. He was reproached for having contracted debts with his regiment. He replied that his total debts had been no more than 1,600 francs, and asked the Minister of War, General Boulanger, to speak for him. Boulanger confirmed what Gaulier had said, and called on anyone who had never owed money to throw the first stone. Gaulier was confirmed.

Gaulier generally voted with the radicals. In December 1886 he submitted a proposal to changes the procedural rules on votes of confidence in a ministry. On 11 February 1887 he voted against reinstating the district ballot. He voted against the indefinite postponement of revision to the constitution, against prosecution of three members of the Ligue des Patriotes and against the draft Lisbonne law restricting the freedom of the press. He abstained from voting on the prosecution of General Boulanger. His term ended on 11 November 1889.

Alfred Gaulier died on 17 January 1898 in Paris.

== Publications ==
Apart from newspaper articles, Gaulier was responsible for several proposals and reports as a deputy:

- Gaulier, Alfred-Nicolas (9 December 1886), Proposition de résolution tendant à modifier l'article 103 du Règlement de la Chambre (Chambre des Députés. 4e législature. Session extraordinaire 1886. N ° 1360), Paris: Quantin, p. 3
- Gaulier, Alfred-Nicolas (27 January 1887), Rapport sommaire fait, au nom de la 9e commission d'initiative parlementaire chargée d'examiner la proposition de loi de M. Félix Faure tendant à l'institution d'une caisse spéciale ayant pour objet d'aider l'initiative privée pour la création d'hôtels de marins (Chambre des Députés. 4e législature. Session 1887. N ° 1495), Paris: Quantin, p. 3
- Gaulier, Alfred-Nicolas (31 March 1887), Proposition de résolution tendant à inviter le gouvernement à étudier et à proposer à la rentrée des Chambres les mesures législatives propres à réserver, aux seuls Conseils locaux, la connaissance des affaires d'intérêt local et à assurer par l'interdiction légale du cumul des mandats électifs la séparation et la bonne gestion des intérêts régionaux et des intérêts nationaux (Chambre des Députés. 4e législature. Session 1887. N ° 171), Paris: Quantin, p. 4
- Gaulier, Alfred-Nicolas; Michelin, Henri-Joseph (16 June 1887), Proposition de loi ayant pour objet de conférer les droits des citoyens français aux musulmans indigènes des départements algériens (Chambre des Députés. 4e législature. Session 1887. N ° 1846), Paris: Quantin, p. 3
- Gaulier, Alfred-Nicolas (16 January 1888), Rapport sommaire fait, au nom de la 15e commission d'initiative parlementaire chargée d'examiner la proposition de loi de M. Barodet, ayant pour objet de réaliser progressivement la diffusion de la propriété, l'amortissement de la dette publique, la diminution des impôts et l'extinction du paupérisme (Chambre des Députés. 4e législature. Session 1888. N ° 2272), Paris: Quantin, p. 6
- Gaulier, Alfred-Nicolas (29 November 1888), Proposition de résolution ayant pour objet l'exercice du droit d'initiative parlementaire, en matière d'ouverture de crédit (Chambre des députés. 4e législature. Session extraordinaire de 1888. N ° 3264), Paris: Impr. de Quantin, p. 5

== Sources ==
- Alfred, Nicolas Gaulier (in French), Assemblée nationale
- Cossart, Paula (2013), From Deliberation to Demonstration: Political Rallies in France (1868-1939), ECPR Press, ISBN 978-1-907301-46-9
- Hutton, Patrick H. (1981), The Cult of the Revolutionary Tradition: The Blanquists in French Politics, 1864-1893, University of California Press, ISBN 978-0-520-04114-1
- Jolly, Jean, ed. (1960), "Roche (Ernest, Jean)", dictionnaire des parlementaires français de 1889 à 1940, Presses universitaires de France
- Monod, G. (1886), "Contemporary Life and Thought in France", The Living Age, Living Age Company, Incorporated
- Naugrette, Florence (ed.), Lettres de Juliette Drouet à Victor Hugo, Université de Rouen, ISSN 2271-8923
- Robert, Adolphe; Cougny, Gaston (1889–1891), "GAULIER (ALFRED-NICOLAS)", in Edgar Bourloton (ed.), Dictionnaire des Parlementaires français (1789–1889) (in French)
- Rochfort, Henri (1886), "Radicalism in France", The North American Review, University of Northern Iowa
- Schweitz, Arlette (2001), Les parlementaires de la Seine sous la Troisième République: Études (in French), Publications de la Sorbonne, ISBN 978-2-85944-432-7
