= Laguerre (surname) =

Laguerre is a surname. Notable people with the surname include:

- Edmond Laguerre (1834-1886), French mathematician
- Enrique Laguerre (1905-2005), Puerto Rican writer
- Jean Henri Georges Laguerre (1858–1912), French lawyer and politician
- John Laguerre (1688-1748), French historical painter, son of Louis Laguerre
- Louis Laguerre (1663-1721), French painter of the English school
