= Victor Leydet (painter) =

French painter

- Born: July 21, 1861; L'Isle-sur-la-Sorgue, France
- Died: October 20, 1904 (aged 43); Sorgues, France
- Occupation: Painter

Victor Leydet (French: [viktɔʁ lɛdɛ]; 1861–1904) was a French genre painter.

== Biography ==
Victor Leydet was born on July 21, 1861, in L'Isle-sur-la-Sorgue. He was trained as a painter at the École des beaux-arts d'Avignon, now known as the École supérieure d'art d'Avignon in Avignon, where painter Pierre Grivolas (1823-1906) was his teacher. He was also trained by painters Gabriel Bourges and Jean-Léon Gérôme (1824-1904).

As a professional painter, he was a member of the New School of Avignon. His painting entitled Femmes en prières is exhibited in the Musée d'Orsay in Paris. Some of his other paintings, like Portrait du jeune homme, en pied or Avant la messe, can be seen in the Musée Calvet in Avignon.

He was a member of the Académie de Vaucluse.

He died on October 20, 1904, in Sorgues.

== Selected works ==
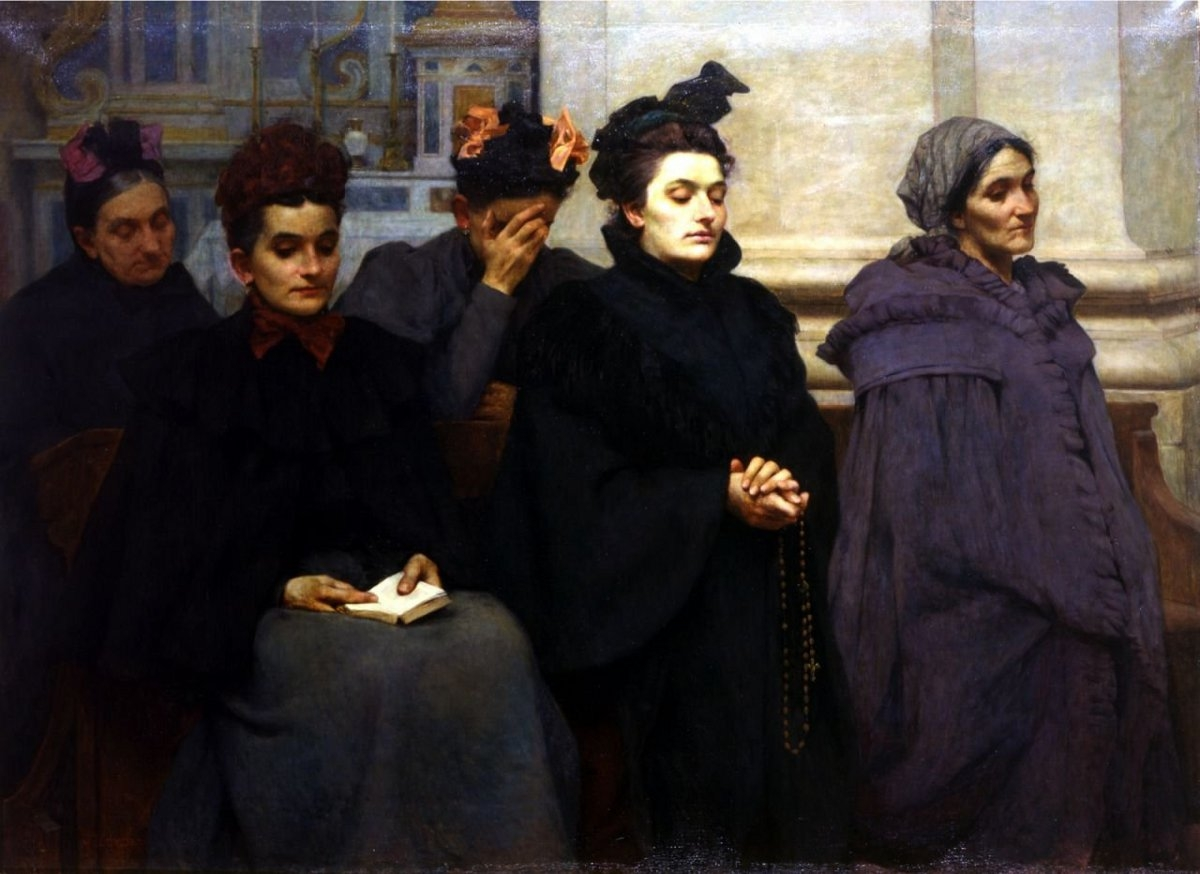
After the Mass

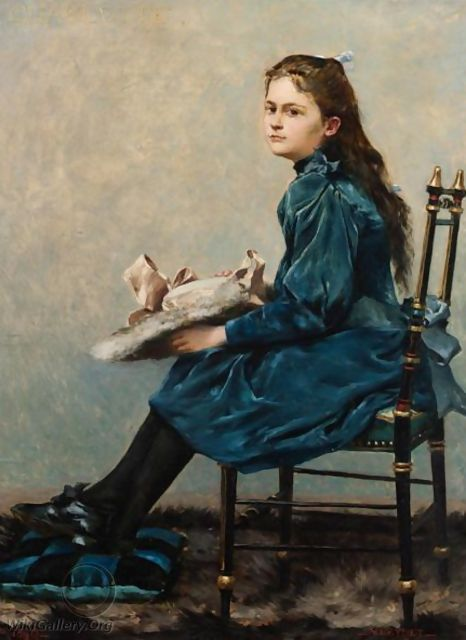
Charlotte

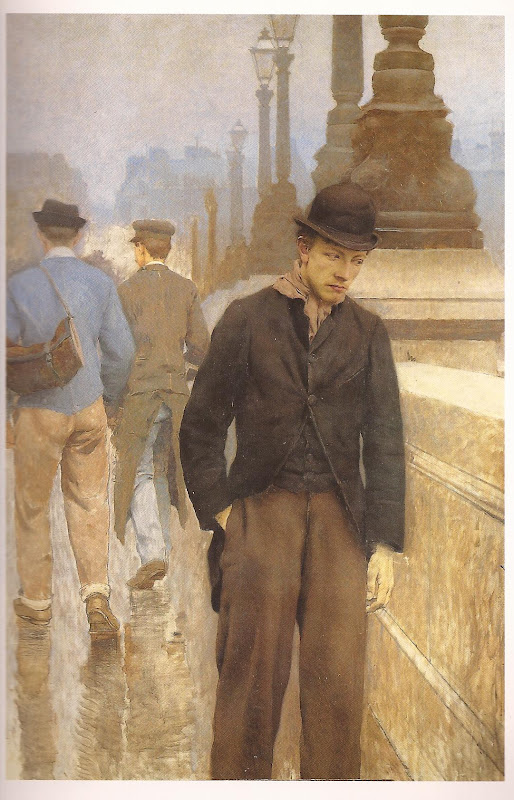
The Hopeless

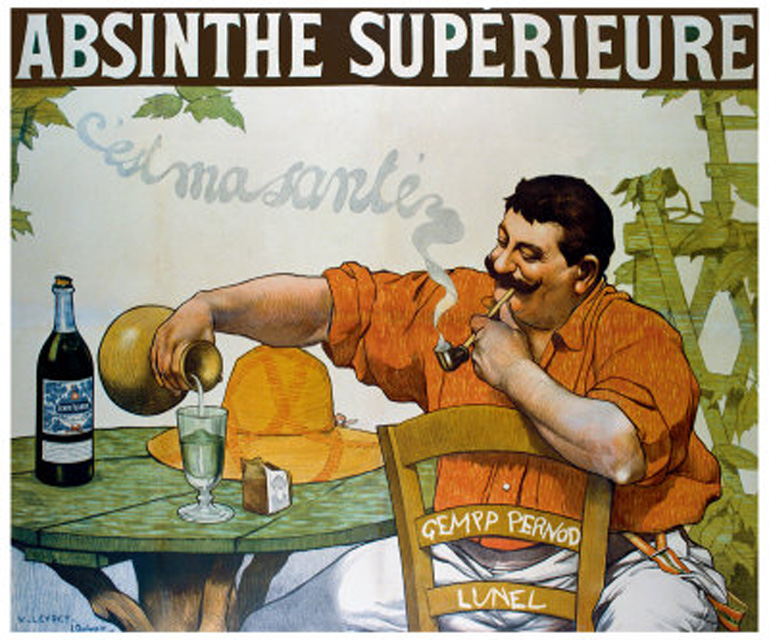
Absinthe supérieure

== Secondary source ==
- Victor Leydet, peintre du 19e: 1861 - L'Isle-sur-la-Sorgue (Campredon art et culture (L'Isle-sur-la-Sorgue, Vaucluse), 1985, 47 pages).
