= Baptiste Bonnet =

French writer in the Provençal dialect

Batisto Bonnet
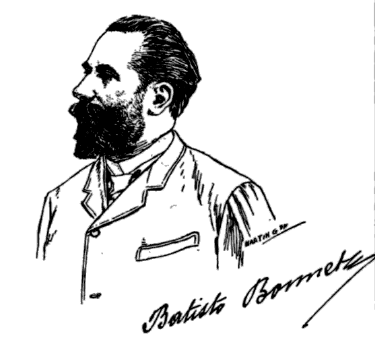
- Engraving portrait of Batisto Bonnet from Henry Carnoy's International Biographical Dictionary of Writers in 1909
- Born: 22 February 1844; Bellegarde, Gard, France
- Died: 5 April 1925 (aged 81); Nîmes, France
- Occupation: Writer

Batisto Bonnet (22 February 1844 – 5 April 1925) was a French writer in the Provençal dialect. He is known for his Vie d'enfant (1894), an autobiographical account of his childhood as an illiterate peasant in the rural south of France.

== Life ==
Batisto Bonnet was born on 21 February 1844 in the village of Bellegarde, between Arles and Nîmes. His father was from Arles and his mother from Graveson. His father was a day-labourer, and Batisto was one of seven children. He had a difficult childhood in a very poor peasant family, in a village among the vines. He later wrote the story of his childhood in his masterpiece Vido d'enfant, which was translated into French as Vie d'enfant by Alphonse Daudet. He did not go to school. From the age of ten he was a shepherd in the land of Arles in winter and of Luberon in summer. He spent his military service in Africa, spending five years in the Sahel. He learned to read during this period. After completing his service Bonnet returned to Bellegarde.

Bonnet was recalled to the army in July 1870 at the outbreak of the Franco-Prussian War, fought at Châtillon and was wounded at Champigny. He remained in Paris after the war. He married Marie Céleste L'Huillier. Bonnet was taught French by his fellow-Provençal Duc-Quercy, and said later Duc-Quercy "looked like a small black bull breathing fire from mouth and nostrils. His first writings appeared in the Viro Souleu in Paris, where they were noticed by Frédéric Mistral and Alphonse Daudet. Daudet wrote to him several times inviting him to meet in Paris, but it took six months before Bonnet could buy a frock coat and waistcoat for the visit.

In 1877, the Soucieta Felibrenco dé Paris was founded by Bonnet, Jean Barnabé Amy, Joseph Banquier, Antoine Duc (Duc-Quercy), Maurice Faure, Louis Gleize and Pierre Grivolas. The society created the journal Lou Viro-Souléu. Bonnet wrote in Provençal and Daudet translated his work. Daudet's translation of Vido d'enfant appeared in 1894 and was well received, including a good review by Georges Clemenceau in the Dépêche. At that time he was working as a gardener in Paris. Bonnet was a member of the Félibrige in 1897, a literary and cultural association founded by Mistral and other Provençal writers to defend and promote the Provençal or langue d'oc language and literature.

Bonnet had started to work on Varlet de mas when his wife died in November 1897, and Daudet died a month later. Daudet's son Léon Daudet wrote the preface to Varlet de Mas in 1898. Bonnet returned to Bellegarde in 1907, after 36 years in Paris. He created a local magazine, le Midi et le Nord. He lived in Bellegarde for five years, in Bouillargues for five years, then in 1917 settled in Nîmes, where he lived in poverty for the rest of his life. He died in Nîmes in 5 April 1925. A square and a primary school in Bellegarde are named in his memory.

== Works ==
- Batisto Bonnet (1894), Un paysan du Midi. Vie d'enfant (in French), translated by Alphonse Daudet, Paris: E. Dentu, p. 503
- Batisto Bonnet (1912), Un paysan du midi. Le "baïle" Alphonse Daudet, souvenirs (in Occitan and French), Paris: E. Flammarion, p. 460
- Batisto Bonnet (1921), Lou Carpan! dramo de famiho pacano, Nîmes: Impr. 'l'Ouvrière'; libr. H. Teissier, p. 32
- Batisto Bonnet (1929), Vie d'enfant. Le Valet de ferme. Oeuvres provençales de Baptiste Bonnet, translated by Alphonse Daudet, illustrated by Pierre Girieud, Paris, impr. Villain et Bar, p. 125
- Batisto Bonnet (1935), Le valet de ferme (in French), translated by Alphonse Daudet, preface by Léon Daudet, Nîmes: Éditions méridionales, p. 387
- Batisto Bonnet (1968), Georges Martin (ed.), Vido d'enfant (in Occitan and French), translated by Alphonse Daudet, preface by André Chamson, Nîmes: Éditions de la Tourmagne, p. 424
- Batisto Bonnet (1981), Vie d'enfant (in Occitan and French), translated by Alphonse Daudet, preface by Michel Ragon, Genève; Paris: Slatkine, p. 499
- Batisto Bonnet (1984), Varlet de mas (in Occitan and French), translated by Alphonse Daudet, Marseille: Edicioun Parlaren, p. 393
- Batisto Bonnet (1992), Le "Baïle" souvenirs, translated by Joseph Loubet, Raphaèle-lès-Arles: CPM, p. 457
- Batisto Bonnet (1994), Lou baile Anfos Daudet souveni, Marsiho [Marseille]: Ed. "Prouvènço d'aro", p. 252
- Batisto Bonnet (2001), Lou Carpan!; Lou saquet dóu gnarro. - La fiero de Bello-Gardo (dramo de famiho pacanao), Berre-L'Étang: Centre international de l'écrit en langue d'oc, p. 160

== Sources ==
- "Baptiste Bonnet", Larousse (in French)
- Carnoy, Henry (1987), Dictionnaire biographique international des écrivains, Georg Olms Verlag, ISBN 978-3-487-41058-6
- Coyne, W. P. (1895), "Batisto Bonnet: A Provence Peasant", The New Ireland Review, New Ireland Review Office
- "Ecole Primaire Batisto Bonnet", educanuair.info (in French), archived from the original on 2014-01-02
- Imbert, L. (1 October 1938), "BAPTISTE BONNET – Une grande amitié (1844-1925)", Bellegarde (in French)
- Petit, Marcel, Vido d'enfant - Batisto Bonnet. (in Occitan and French)
