= Bellegarde, Gard =

Commune in Occitanie, France

Bellegarde
- Commune
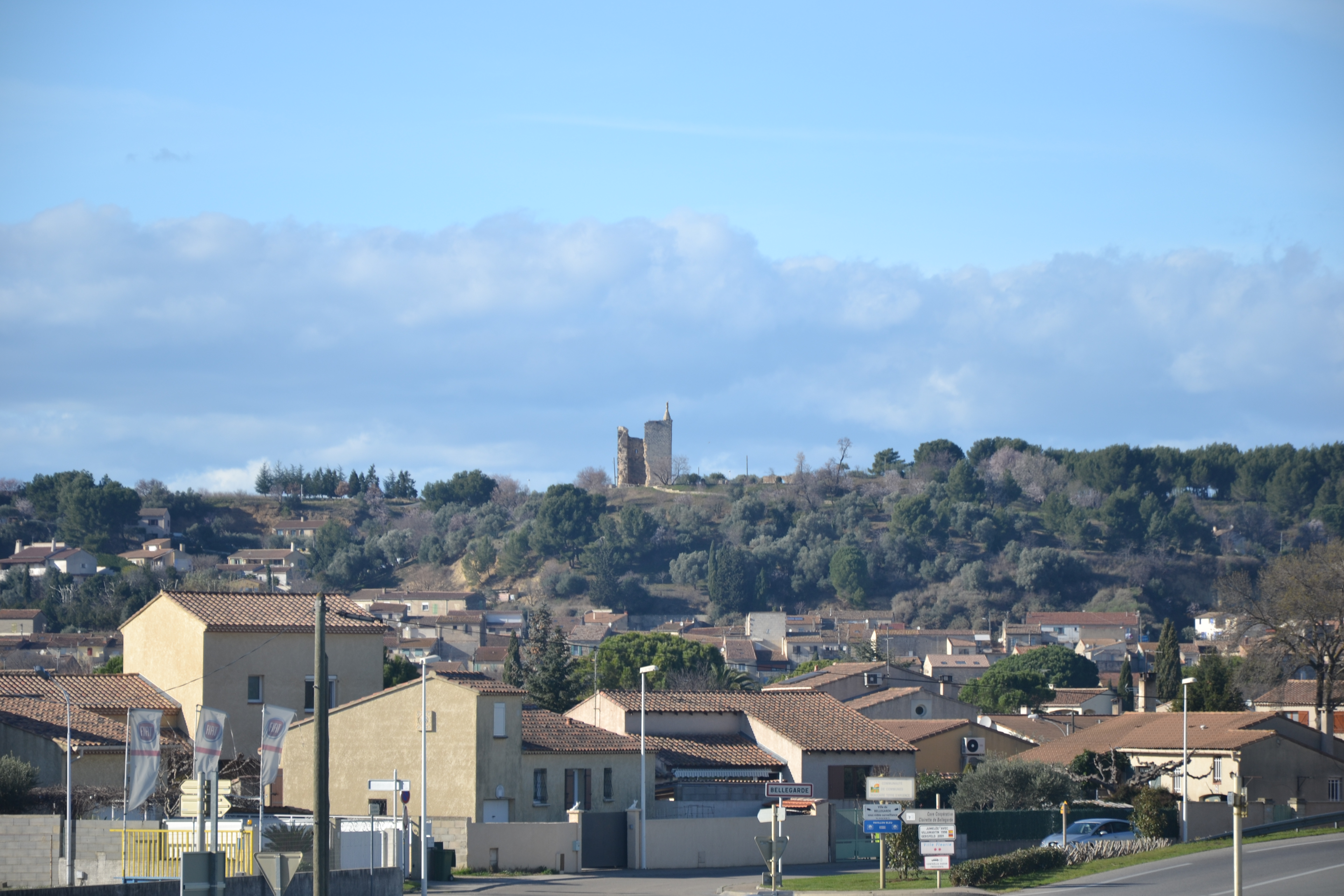
- A general view of Bellegarde

- Coat of arms
- Location of Bellegarde
- Location within France Location within Occitanie
- Coordinates: 43°45′16″N 4°30′55″E
- Country: France
- Region: Occitania
- Department: Gard
- Arrondissement: Nîmes
- Canton: Beaucaire
- Intercommunality: Beaucaire-Terre d'Argence

Government
  - Mayor (2020–2026): Juan Martinez
- Area^{1}: 44.96 km^{2} (17.36 sq mi)
- Elevation: 10 m (33 ft)
- Highest elevation: 102 m (335 ft)
- Lowest elevation: 1 m (3.3 ft)
- Population (2023): 8,035
  - Density: 178.7/km^{2} (462.9/sq mi)
- Time zone: UTC+01:00 (CET)
  - Summer (DST): UTC+02:00 (CEST)
- INSEE/Postal code: 30034 /30127
- ^{1} French Land Register data, which excludes lakes, ponds, glaciers > 1 km^{2} (0.386 sq mi or 247 acres) and river estuaries.

Bellegarde (French pronunciation: [bɛlɡaʁd]; Provençal: Bèlagarda) is a commune in the Gard department in southern France.

The village was the birthplace of Batisto Bonnet (1844–1925), a noted writer in the Provençal dialect.

== Population ==
Historical population
Year	Pop.	±% p.a.
1968	3,052	—
1975	3,163	+0.51%
1982	3,924	+3.13%
1990	4,508	+1.75%
1999	4,913	+0.96%
2007	6,202	+2.96%
2012	6,500	+0.94%
2017	7,129	+1.86%
2023	8,035	+2.01%
Source: INSEE

== See also ==
- Costières de Nîmes AOC
- Communes of the Gard department
