= Gabriel Deville =

French socialist theoretician and politician

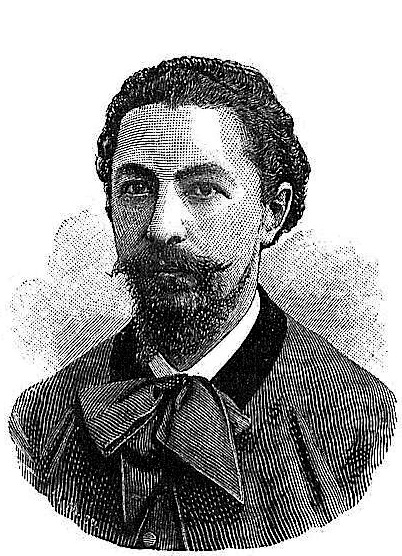
- Portrait of Deville from Der Wahre Jacob, 1890

Deputy for the Seine
- In office 21 June 1896 – 31 May 1898
- Preceded by: Désiré Barodet

Deputy for the Seine
- In office 5 April 1903 – 31 May 1906
- Preceded by: Daniel Cloutier

Personal details
- Born: Gabriel Pierre Deville; 8 March 1854 Tarbes, Hautes-Pyrénées, France
- Died: 28 February 1940 (aged 85) Viroflay, Yvelines, France
- Occupation: Socialist theoretician, politician and diplomat

Gabriel Pierre Deville (8 March 1854 – 28 February 1940) was a French socialist theoretician, politician and diplomat. He was a follower of the Guesdist movement in the 1880s, and did much to raise awareness of Karl Marx's theories of the weaknesses of capitalism through his books and articles. Later, without abandoning his beliefs, he became more pragmatic and was twice a deputy in the National Assembly. After leaving office he accepted various diplomatic positions.

== Early years ==
Gabriel Deville was born on 8 March 1854 in Tarbes, Hautes-Pyrénées. His family had a strong republican tradition. His grandfather was Jean-Marie-Joseph Deville^{(fr)}, Representative of the People from 1848 to 1851 during the French Second Republic. His uncle was Amédée Deville, vice-president of the Anatomical Society of Paris, who was proscribed after the coup d'état of 2 December 1851. Gabriel Deville attended secondary school in Tarbes, then studied in the faculties of law in Toulouse and Paris, where he obtained his license as a lawyer.

Deville joined a Marxist section of the International Workingmen's Association in Toulouse as a 17-year-old student. Deville studied the works of Karl Marx, including the translation of Le Capital by Joseph Roy. Deville moved to Paris to complete his law degree in 1872, and joined the Latin Quarter radicals. He became one of the leaders of the discussions.

== Guesdist theoretician ==
Talking of his early years Deville wrote, "In 1877 when I was one of those who began to propagate the collectivist and Marxist theory by the newspaper, I scarcely knew the rudiments ... We learned socialism at the same time that we informed our readers, and it is incontestable that we sometimes made mistakes." Deville's pamphlet Blanqui libre (1878) portrayed Louis Auguste Blanqui, now an old man, as a benign leader who had suffered from oppression. The pamphlet was vague about Blanqui's revolutionary principles. In the spring of 1879 Deville tried to give national publicity to the campaign to elect the imprisoned Blanqui as deputy for Bordeaux. He was the key figure in this Guesdist effort, which was seen as a form of national plebiscite on amnesty for the leaders of the Paris Commune.

Throughout the 1880s Deville supported Jules Guesde's French Workers' Party (POF: Parti Ouvrier Francais). He contributed to Guesde's newspaper L'Egalité. Deville began to gain a reputation as a socialist theoretician. He wrote various works on socialism including Cours d'économie sociale – L'évaluation du capital (1884), Philosophie du Socialisme (1886) and L'anarchisme (1887). He was naturally opposed to anti-Guesdist socialists, many of whom were Freemasons, and wrote scathingly of Benoît Malon's "masonic socialism". As a Guesdist he saw inequality as a serious issue, and wrote,

I'm quite willing to admit that there has been an improvement over the past while. All the same, what does such a comparison prove? You don't bother with such things if you remember that well-being is basically relative. In order to give an accurate account of the improvement or degradation of working-class conditions, you don't compare what they now consume with what they once consumed, but the gap existing then and now between the condition of the proletariat and that of the capitalists."

In August 1882 Marx visited Paris to visit his two daughters. Deville, Guesde and Marx's son-in-law Paul Lafargue lunched with him at the home of José Mesa^{(es)} one day, and Marx later told Engels that he was fatigued by their lively talk, filled with "gossip and chatter". When both Guesde and Deville said they would challenge anyone who called them a coward to a duel, Marx told them the idiocy and immaturity of their comments was offensive. In 1887 Lafargue's La Socialiste, the organ of the Guesdist movement, was at risk of closing. Duc-Quercy, Lafarge and Guesde went to Marseille in an attempt to expand circulation. Deville donated funds from an inheritance, which kept the paper alive until early February 1888, when it ceased publication until September 1890.

== Pragmatic socialist ==
In the early 1890s Deville gradually withdrew from formal POF membership, although his work continued to show Guesdist influences. On July 1, 1893, George Diamandy published the first issue of L'Ère Nouvelle ("The New Era"), a "monthly for scientific socialism". It viewed itself as both a literary and a sociological review: dedicated to promoting naturalism and historical materialism. It openly provoking the reading public to explore the work of Émile Zola and attacked "reactionary" critics. It also proudly called itself "eclectic". L'Ère Nouvelle hosted articles by Marxist thinkers from the various countries of Europe: primarily Friedrich Engels and Paul Lafargue, but also Georgi Plekhanov, Clara Zetkin, Karl Kautsky, Jean Jaurès, Gabriel Deville and Jules Guesde. Deville published L'Etat et le Socialisme (1893), Socialisme, révolution, internationalisme (1893) and Principes socialistes (1896). His Introduction to the abridged Le Capital, de Karl Marx, résumé et accompagné d'un aperçu sur le socialisme scientifique is a masterly summary of Marx's analysis of the process of accumulation. It was highly effective in making the arguments in Marx's lengthy work accessible to the public.

On 21 June 1896 Deville was elected deputy for the first district of the 4th arrondissement of Paris in a by-election after Désiré Barodet^{(fr)} had resigned. He ran on an anti-Guesdist platform, and was among those vilified by the POF for their "dire spirit of personal vanity and the hunger for advantages". He ran for reelection for the second district in 1898, but was defeated and left office on 31 May 1898. Around this time Jean Jaurès asked Deville to help him locate primary material on the French Revolution in the parliamentary archives. Although Deville still took a theoretical interest in capitalism's economic and social problems, he had now become much closer to the independent socialists associated with Jaurès. Deville wrote Thermidor et Directoire (1794–1799), a volume of Jaurès's Histoire socialiste. His volume was dominated by the character of François-Noël Babeuf (Gracchus Babeuf), the leader of the 1796 "Conspiracy of the Equals". Babeuf gave a clear statement of egalitarian principles, but was also pragmatic and willing to support the Directory against the threat of royalist counter-revolution.

In 1899 Deville supported Alexandre Millerand's entry into the cabinet of Pierre Waldeck-Rousseau. On 22 March 1903 Deville was elected to the fourth district in a by-election to replace Daniel Cloutier^{(fr)}, who had died. He defeated Maurice Barrès in the second round of voting. In the house he positioned himself with Juarès and Aristide Briand. Deville was secretary of the Committee for Separation of the Church and the State. Ferdinand Buisson was president of this committee and Briand was rapporteur. He was active in debates and proposed various laws. Deville became a member of the Central Committee for Research and Publication of Documents on the Economic History of the French Revolution in December 1903. In June 1905 he became a member of the Library and Archives Organization Committee. He did not run for reelection in the 1906 general elections. Deville left office on 31 May 1906.

== Later career ==
On 29 April 1907 Deville was appointed Minister Plenipotentiary 2nd class, extraordinary envoy to Ethiopia, but was not installed. On 16 July 1907 he was appointed delegate of France to the European Commission of the Danube. On 6 February 1909 he became Deputy Director of Chancery Affairs. On 5 June 1909 he was appointed Envoy Extraordinary and Minister Plenipotentiary at Athens, Greece. He retired after this.

Gabriel Deville died at the age of 85 on 28 February 1940 in Viroflay, Yvelines.

== Publications ==
Publications by Gabriel Deville include:

- Gabriel Deville (1874), Des divers ordres de succession, Paris: typ. N. Blanpain
- Gabriel Deville (1876), Biographie du citoyen Emile Acollas, Paris: A. Chaix
- Gabriel Deville (1878), Blanqui libre, Paris: tous les libraires
- Gabriel Deville (1883), Le capital : Aperçu sur le socialisme scientifique, Paris: H. Oriol
- Gabriel Deville (1884), L'évolution du capital, Paris: H. Oriol
- Gabriel Deville (1886), Philosophie du socialisme, Paris: Bibliothèque socialiste
- Gabriel Deville (1887), L'Anarchisme, Paris: Librairie du Parti ouvrier
- Gabriel Deville (1887), Le Capital, de Karl Marx, résumé et accompagné d'un aperçu sur le socialisme scientifique, Paris: C. Marpon et E. Flammarion
- Honoré de Balzac (1888), Gabriel Deville (ed.), La Femme et l'amour, Paris: C. Lévy
- Gabriel Deville (1890–1891), "Note sur le développement du langage", Revue de linguistique, Orléans: impr. de G. Jacob
- Gabriel Deville (1895), Gabriel Deville. L'État et le socialisme, Paris: Groupe des étudiants collectivistes
- Karl Marx; Friedrich Engels (1896), Le Manifeste du parti communiste par Karl Marx et Frédéric Engels, Aperçu sur le socialisme scientifique par Gabriel Deville, Bruxelles
- Gabriel Deville (1896), Principes socialistes, Paris: V. Giard et E. Brière
- Gabriel Deville (1901), Jean Jaurès (ed.), Thermidor et Directoire (1794–1799), Paris: J. Rouff
- Gabriel Deville (1924), Calendrier nouveau et chronologie ancienne : Exemplaire avec des notes et des corrections manuscrites, Viroflay, Seine-et-Oise / Versailles: l'auteur / impr. de C. Barbier
- Gabriel Deville, L'Entente, la Grèce et la Bulgarie (Notes d'histoire et souvenirs), Paris: E. Figuière

== Sources ==
- Călinescu, George (1986), Istoria literaturii române de la origini pînă în prezent (in Romanian), Bucharest: Editura Minerva
- Derfler, Leslie (1991), Paul Lafargue and the Founding of French Marxism, 1842–1882, Harvard University Press, ISBN 978-0-674-65903-2
- Gabriel Deville (in French), Assemblée nationale
- Gabriel Deville (1854–1940) (in French), BnF: Bibliothèque nationale de France
- Hutton, Patrick H. (1981), The Cult of the Revolutionary Tradition: The Blanquists in French Politics, 1864–1893, University of California Press, ISBN 978-0-520-04114-1
- Jolly, Jean (1960–1977), "DEVILLE (GABRIEL)", Dictionnaire des parlementaires français de 1889 à 1940, Paris: Presses universitaires de France, ISBN 2-1100-1998-0
- Petculescu, Constantin (June 1975), "Lupta revoluționară și democratică a studențimii române. Tineri demni de tinerețea lor", Magazin Istoric (in Romanian)
- Stuart, Robert (2002-05-02), Marxism at Work: Ideology, Class and French Socialism During the Third Republic, Cambridge University Press, ISBN 978-0-521-89305-3
- Voisin, André (1894), "Revue des périodiques. L'Ère Nouvelle", Revue Internationale de Sociologie (in French), II – via Gallica
- Wright, Julian (2017), Socialism and the Experience of Time: Idealism and the Present in Modern France, Oxford University Press, ISBN 978-0-19-953358-9
