= Ernest Roche =

French politician (1850–1917)

Ernest Jean Roche
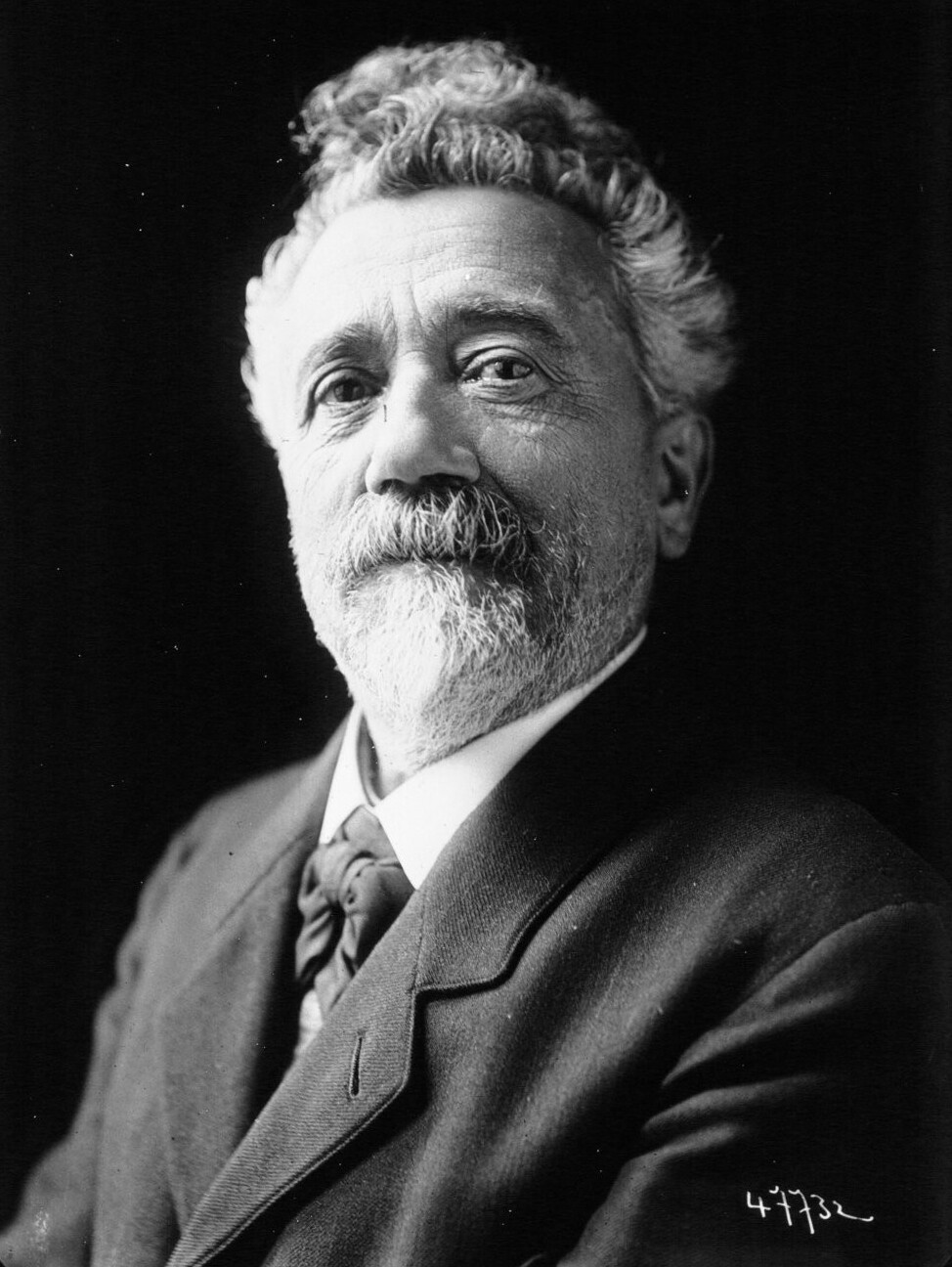
- Ernest Roche in 1914

Deputy for the Seine
- In office 6 October 1889 – 31 May 1906

Deputy for the Seine
- In office 8 May 1910 – 31 May 1914

Personal details
- Born: 19 October 1850 Bordeaux, France
- Died: 27 December 1917 (aged 67) Paris, France
- Occupation: Engraver, politician

Ernest Jean Roche (19 October 1850 – 27 December 1917) was a French engraver and socialist politician. He was of working class origin, and became involved in trade union activity while young. He was a supporter of the revolutionary socialist Louis Auguste Blanqui. He was imprisoned for his role in a strike of coal miners in 1886. He was elected to the national legislature in 1889, holding office until 1906, and was reelected from 1910 to 1914. He always supported workers and people who were suppressed for their views or political activities. Later he moved towards antisemitism and a more nationalistic form of socialism.

== Early years ==
Ernest Jean Roche was born on 19 October 1850 in Bordeaux. His father was a worker. Ernest Roche began work as an engraver in Bordeaux while very young, and soon became involved in trade union affairs.

== Socialist leader ==
Roche was a committed supporter of Louis Auguste Blanqui. He was a member of the Blanquist Revolutionary Socialist Committee of Bordeaux. In 1879 Roche led this committee in the campaign for Blanqui to be elected to the Chamber of Deputies. They organized a coalition of radical, socialist and revolutionary groups in support of Blanqui against the moderate republican incumbent, and Blanqui was elected in April 1879. The election was annulled, and Blanqui's reelection in August 1879 was also annulled. However, the campaign contributed to obtaining a pardon for Blanqui and helped the Communards' amnesty proposal to pass in the Chamber of Deputies.

Roche was made secretary of the Chambre Syndicale des Mécaniciens. He was a delegate of the workers' unions at the Third Socialist Workers' Congress in Marseilles in October 1879. At this congress Roche was among the Collectivist orators who called for intellectual, economic and political war between the classes. The violent demands at this congress led to an amnesty being granted to the socialist leaders who had been prescribed in 1871 after the fall of the Paris Commune. Roche began building a revolutionary party in Bordeaux after the Blanqui campaign, but before the job was done decided to move to Paris. He arrived in Paris in 1881. Roche was not able to find a job as an engraver in Paris, but Henri Rochefort gave him a position on his journal L'Intransigeant despite his apparent lack of qualifications. He was in charge of the workers' section of L'Intransigeant until 1906.

== Industrial action ==
A strike began on 26 January 1886 in Decazeville, Aveyron department. among the workers of the Société des Houllères et Fonderies de l'Aveyron. It lasted 108 days and drew national attention. The engineer Watrin was thrown out of a window and died. Duc-Quercy went to Decazeville to support the strike and to draw national attention to the social issues in his Cri de peuple. Ernest Roche also went, as did the socialist politicians Zéphyrin Camélinat, Clovis Hugues and Antide Boyer. Duc-Quercy and Ernest Roche were charged by the police. The North American Review printed Henri Rochefort's account of the events,

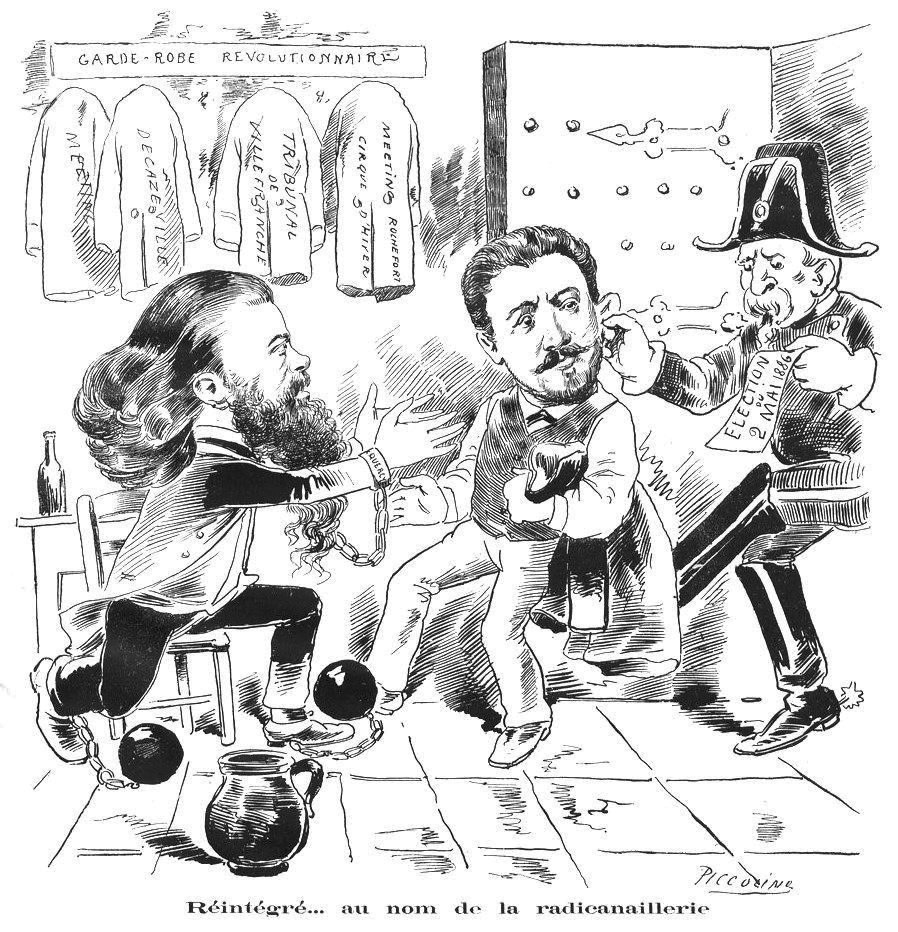
Duc-quercy and Ernest Roche Réintégré... au nom de la radicanaillerie. From La Cravache illustrée, 10 May 1886

Irritated by the continuance of this strike, which was injuring their interests, certain influential financiers persuaded the Ministry that it would suffice to make the miners resume their work immediately if Roche and Quercy were removed. One morning both journalists were brutally arrested and dragged in chains through the whole town. Some days afterward, in contempt of the most formal processes of law, a servile tribunal condemned MM. Roche and Quercy, contrary to all law and all justice, to fifteen months imprisonment, under the pretext that they had made an attack upon liberty to labor. This unique sentence, which was applauded by the Opportunists and the Monarchists, aroused among the Radicals (even among those who, like M. Clemenceau, had never approved the attitude of MM. Roche and Quercy) a general indignation.

A different viewpoint was given in The Living Age,

M. Roche and M. Duc Quercy were arrested on the charge of having wittingly disseminated false information for the purpose of stirring up the workmen. Alter a scandalous trial, in the course of which M. Laguerre, a deputy, and the reporter of the Budget for Justice, insulted the procurator of the republic in open court, the accused were sentenced to fifteen months' imprisonment. The initial result of the sentence was to make M. Roche a candidate at the Parliamentary election of the 2nd of May; and the government was summoned to release him from prison in order that he might appear on the hustings. The government showed its usual want of resolution. It sent a magistrate to entreat the prisoner to take the necessary steps in order to his being thus provisionally set at liberty. The election gave melancholy proof of the level to which universal suffrage has fallen in the capital. No respectable candidate, no one of any sort of standing. ventured to present himself; and the contest was limited to two journalists of the twelfth rank, and of almost equally extravagant opinions, M. Gaulier and M. Roche. M. Gaulier was elected ...

Roche was sentenced to 15 months imprisonment for participating in the organization of miner's strikes in Anzin, and particularly Decazeville. Henri Rochefort resigned from his seat as a deputy, triggering a by-election in which the socialists combined to nominate Roche as their candidate. Clemenceau decided not to support Roche, and instead sponsored Alfred Gaulier as the Radical candidate. Roche received over 100,000 votes, but Gaulier won the election. After the election Roche was returned to prison. He was pardoned after 6 months.

== Deputy for the Seine ==
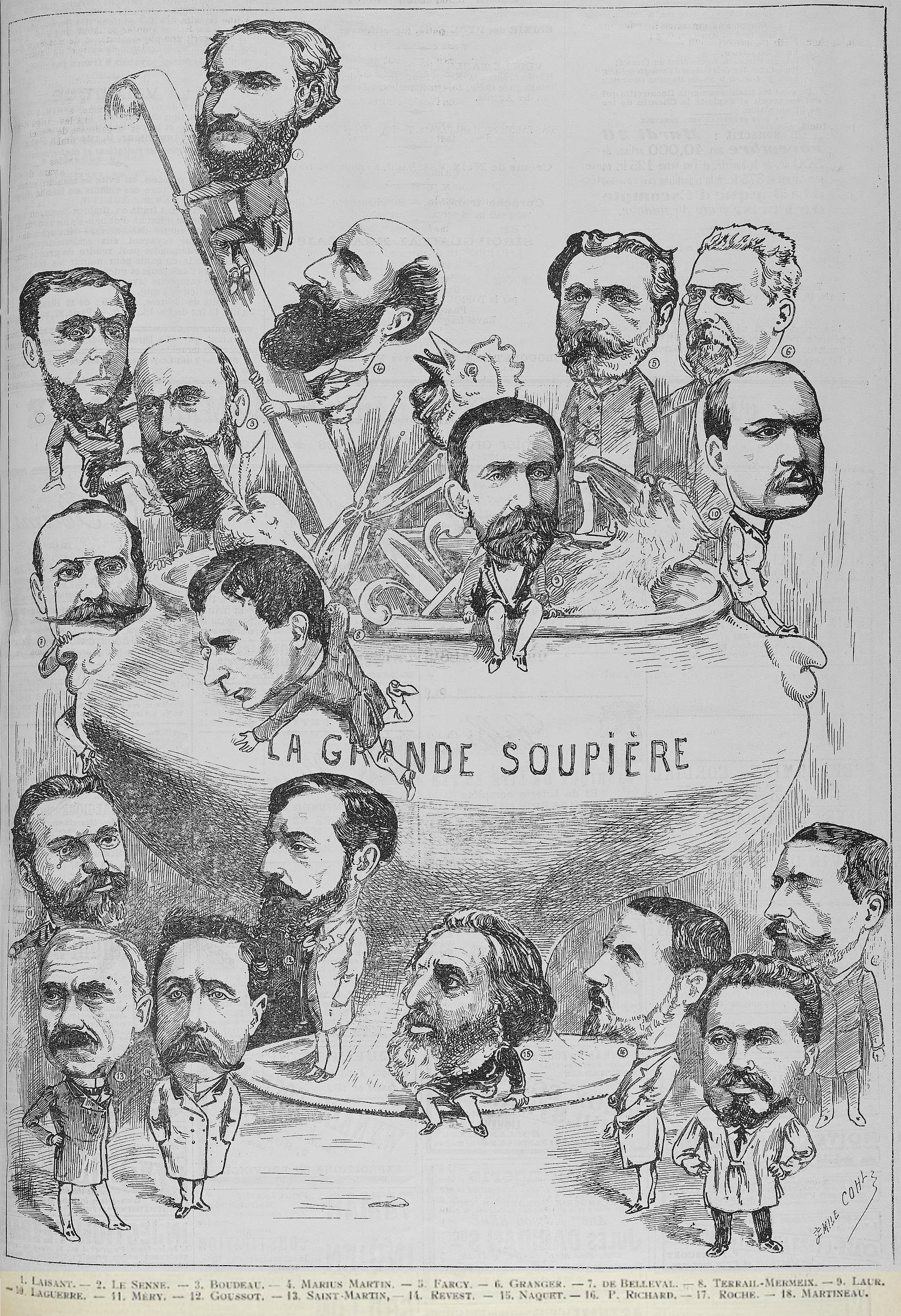
Boulangist deputies for the Seine Le Charivari, 1889. Roche is in the bottom right corner.

Roche made several unsuccessful attempts in municipal and national elections before being chosen on 4 October 1889 as Deputy for the Seine for the 2nd constituency of the 17th arrondissement of Paris. In this election the Blanquists and Boulangists cooperated, dividing the electoral districts of Paris between the two parties. Roche won in the first round with 8,953 votes against 7,758 for the Republican candidate Edmond Lepelletier.

In the chamber Roche supported the program of General Georges Ernest Boulanger and campaigned for revision of the constitution, abolition of the Senate, and the referendum. As a Blanquist revolutionary socialist he continued to fight for the amnesty and for abolition of the special courts. In his speeches he always supported the oppressed including the workers or those who suffered for their opinions or political actions. He was strongly opposed to the draft law restricting the freedom of the press. Roche contributed articles to the left-wing journals Le ralliement of Lyon from 1890 and Le réveil du peuple of Paris from 1892 to 1894. Roche was reelected on 20 August 1893 and 8 May 1898.

In the last years of the 19th century several of the Blanquists moved to the Right, while retaining Jacobin ideals. Many of the supporters of Ernest Granger followed him into national socialism and the Ligue des Patriotes, a movement that Rochefort also supported. Roche was the effective leader of this faction of the Blanquists. He continued to call for worker's solidarity, but became increasingly nationalistic in his views. At the 1899 celebration of the anniversary of the Paris Commune, which Henri Rochefort and L'Intransigeant hosted, the speeches took an anti-Dreyfus theme in which Dreyfus was presented as a capitalist and a clerical. Roche made a speech in which he said,

Imagine what would have become of our republic and of socialism, if during these last years Rochefort had not been there. Jewish and German gold would have been free to corrupt and to buy everything! ... exploitative capitalism threatens to stifle the nascent socialist movement, or to turn it from its goal. ... What common interests could French socialists have with this representative of international capital? ... The anarchists of the café-concerts ... have been bought for the charlatan party of "The Affair" by those with money; socialists like Jaurès, bought as well, are charged with seducing the proletariat with lies, equivocations, and sophisms; while the band of opportunists-financiers, directed by Reinach, Rothschild, and Yves Guyot reap the benefits!

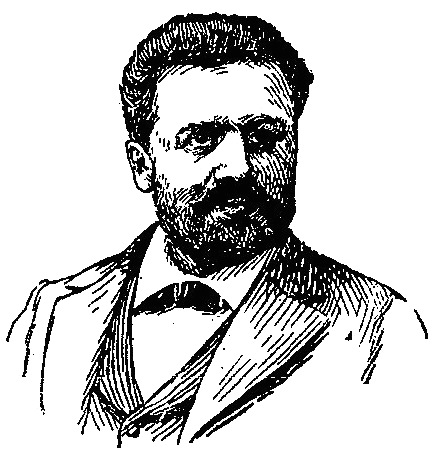
Ernest Roche in 1900

Roche said that Rochefort's leadership had prevented French socialism from being "domesticated and completely dishonored!" He ended with a toast to Blanqui in which he repeated the Jacobin slogan, "Neither God nor Master".

Roche was again elected on 27 April 1902 on the Nationalist Republican platform, holding office until 31 May 1906. From 1903 he was a strong supporter of the law on separation of the church and the state. He founded the first "soup kitchen", created in the 17th arrondissement and from then subsidized by the Paris municipal council. In the 1906 elections he was defeated in the second round. He was elected Deputy for the Seine on 8 May 1910, holding office until 31 May 1914. In the elections of 26 April 1914 he was decisively beaten in the first round.

Ernest Roche died in Paris on 27 December 1917. He is buried in Père Lachaise Cemetery in the 85th division.

== Publications ==
Publications included:

- Ernest Roche (1879), La justice du peuple ou l'élection de Blanqui à Bordeaux, Bordeaux: imp. de Faure, p. 55
- Ernest Roche (1893), 1889-1893. Mandat législatif du citoyen Ernest Roche, député du XVIIe arrondissement de Paris, Paris: Grande imprimerie, p. 77
- Ernest Roche (1900), L'Avancement de l'avenir et le rajeunissement des cadres, par Ernest Roche, Paris: R. Chapelot, p. 73
- Ernest Roche (1901), France. Chambre des députés (ed.), Discours sur l'amnistie prononcé à la Chambre des députés, le 18 décembre 1900 (extract from the "Journal officiel"), Paris: journal "le Drapeau", p. 24
- Crapules et compagnie : Jaurès et la petite République, rrecueils de documents / Jeunesse blanquiste de Paris, preface by Ernest Roche, Paris: imp. de Chineau, 1901, p. 14
- Ernest Roche (1902), 1898-1902. Mandat législatif du citoyen Ernest Roche, député du XVIIe arrondissement de Paris, Paris: impr. de P. Dupont, p. 71

== Sources ==
- Bullard, Alice; Boyer, Allen D. (2000), Exile to Paradise: Savagery and Civilization in Paris and the South Pacific, 1790-1900, Stanford University Press, ISBN 978-0-8047-3878-1
- Ernest, Jean Roche (in French), Assemblée nationale
- Ernest Roche (1850-1917) (in French), BnF: Bibliotheque nationale de France
- Fonvieille-Vojtovic, Aline (1993), Paul Ramadier, 1888–1961: élu local et homme d'état (in French), Publications de la Sorbonne, ISBN 978-2-85944-226-2
- Hutton, Patrick H. (1981), The Cult of the Revolutionary Tradition: The Blanquists in French Politics, 1864-1893, University of California Press, ISBN 978-0-520-04114-1
- Jolly, Jean, ed. (1960), "Roche (Ernest, Jean)", dictionnaire des parlementaires français de 1889 à 1940, Presses universitaires de France
- Monod, G. (1886), "Contemporary Life and Thought in France", The Living Age, Living Age Company, Incorporated
- Mosse, George Lachmann (1980), Masses and Man: Nationalist and Fascist Perceptions of Reality, Wayne State University Press, ISBN 0-8143-1895-9
- Roche Ernest (1850-1917) (in French), Amis et Passionnés du Père-Lachaise
- Rochfort, Henri (1886), "Radicalism in France", The North American Review, University of Northern Iowa
- Ward, Sir Adolphus William; Leathes, Sir Stanley Mordaunt; Prothero, George Walter (1904), The Cambridge Modern History, vol. 2, CUP Archive, GGKEY:0P3ERG8892T
