= Edmond Lepelletier =

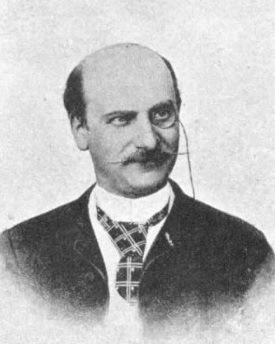

Deputy for Seine
- In office 11 May 1902 – 31 May 1906

Personal details
- Born: 26 June 1846 Paris, France
- Died: 22 July 1913 (aged 67) Vittel, Vosges, France
- Occupation: Journalist, poet, politician

Edmond Lepelletier (26 June 1846 – 22 July 1913) was a French journalist, a prolific popular novelist and a politician. He is known for his lifelong friendship with Paul Verlaine. He was initially a radical, fought for the Paris Commune, and wrote for republican journals. Later he abandoned his friends and became nationalist and antisemitic.

== Early years ==
Lepelletier was born on 26 June 1846 in Paris. He was born in the Monceau district of Batignolles. He received a classical education at the Lycée Bonaparte (now the Lycée Condorcet), then enrolled in the Faculty of Law, where he gained a Bachelor's degree. He never pleaded as a lawyer, and later became a publicist. He married, and was the father of the playwright Saint-Georges de Bouhélier and of the wife of René Viviani. He fought 17 duels, was wounded, and only retained his limbs thanks to the surgeon Jules-Émile Péan. He defended the surgeon obstinately when he was viciously attacked by the press.

Toward the end of the Second French Empire Lepelletier was condemned for attacks on Baron Haussmann, prefect of the Seine. In the Sainte-Pélagie Prison he met Louis Charles Delescluze, later military commander of the Paris Commune, the writer Jules Vallès, Raoul Rigault and other future supporters of the Commune. In 1867 he became a political journalist, writing in the Nain Jaune of Paris. He contributed to the Peuple souverain, Suffrage universel, Patriote français, Rappel à l'homme libre, Droits de l'homme, Radical, Marseillaise, Mot d'ordre and finally to L'Écho de Paris. Lepelletier became known for his novels, mainly drawn from dramatic works, including Le Capitaine Angot (1875), Le chien du commissaire (1876), Ivan le nihiliste (1880), L'Amant de cœur (1884) and Laï-tou (1885). They were written with the same brisk, colorful style that was found in his political articles.

== Radical ==
During the Franco-Prussian War (1870) Lepelletier enlisted in the 69th line regiment, then joined the 110th, and took part in the defense of Paris with his regiment. He was a delegate to the Council of State of the Paris Commune. For this, he was arrested after the Commune was repressed and held in preventative detention for a long time before being sentenced to one month's imprisonment. He wrote later in his history of the Commune, "An idea germinated in the blood-soaked fields of Paris: Paris was to be free and autonomous, it was to practice the dictatorship of example, to serve as model for cities, provinces, states and kingdoms. Paris as a focal point of democracy and the center of social progress was, first of all, to become the capital of the united states of Europe and then to be the Rome of a universal federation of nations."

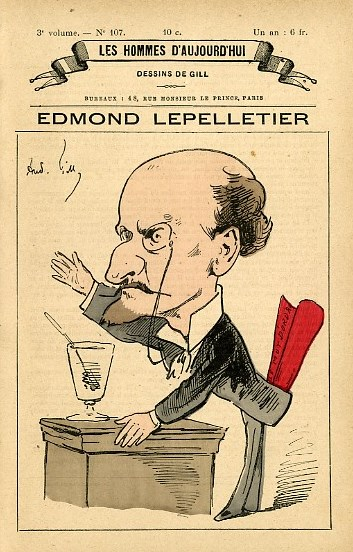
1881 caricature of Lepelletier by André Gill

Lepelletier was a friend of Verlaine until his death, and wrote his biography. Lepelletier recalled that Paul Verlaine (1844–96) was infatuated with Arthur Rimbaud, a very affected young man, and imposed him on all his friends. In 1871, the day after Verlaine and Rimbaud had flaunted their relationship in the Odéon Theatre lobby, Lepelletier wrote in his gossip column that, "Paul Verlaine was arm-in-arm with a charming young lady, Mlle. Rimbaud." At dinner a few days later Rimbaud threatened Lepelletier with a steak knife. Lepelletier wrote that he threw the boy back into his chair, saying that in the recent war he had not been afraid of Prussians, and now he was not going to be bothered by a little troublemaker like Rimbaud. He thought Verlaine's addiction to absinthe "undermined his moral and cerebral stamina, and eventually led to his social and even intellectual downfall." He helped Verlaine in his last moments, and took care of his family.

Le Pelletier held very radical views, but they moderated when he began writing for l'Echo de Paris. For many years he was an active propagandist of Freemasonry, and held a high rank in this movement. In January 1882 he founded a Freemasons lodge, Les Droits de l'homme (Human Rights). This quickly became one of the most brilliant and active lodges in the Grand Orient de France. In 1888 he was made a Knight of the Legion of Honour. During a meeting of the Cirque d'Hiver in 1889 he laid the foundations for the great Republican Union movement that defeated Boulangism.

In the legislative elections of 4 October 1889 the Blanquists and Boulangists cooperated, dividing the electoral districts of Paris between the two parties. Lepelletier ran as Republican candidate for the Seine for the 2nd constituency of the 17th arrondissement of Paris but was defeated in the first round by the Blanquist Ernest Roche, who won 8,953 votes against 7,758 for Lepelletier. He was an anti-revoluationary candidate again in 1893 in the 2nd constituency of the 17th arrondissement of Paris. He was again defeated by Ernest Roche. He was appointed a justice of the peace for the canton of Marly in 1889, but was dismissed in 1899.

== Nationalist ==
In 1898 Lepelletier completely abandoned the Republican majority to join the Nationalists. In 1899 he was President of the International Congress of the Press in Rome. He resigned from Freemasonry, left his political friends and ran successfully in the 1900 Paris municipal election for the Batignolles district as an antisemitic candidate. As an editor at l'Echo de Paris he strongly opposed review of the Dreyfus trial. In the municipal council of Paris and the Seine General Council he voted with the Nationalist majority. On 11 May 1902 he ran for election as a Nationalist Republican in the 2nd constituency of the 17th arrondissement of Paris, and was elected in the second round. He was decisively defeated in the 1906 general elections, He left office on 31 May 1906.

Lepelletier died on 22 July 1913 in Vittel, Vosges.

== Publications ==
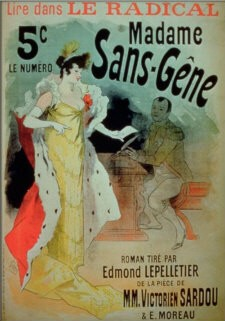
Advertisement for Madame Sans-Gene in Le Radical

Publications by Edmond Lepelletier include:

- Edmond Lepelletier (1877), Le Chien du commissaire, Paris: Dubuisson, p. 191
- Edmond Lepelletier (1884), Le supplice d'une mère, Paris: E. Dentu, p. 303
- Edmond Lepelletier (1884), L'amant de coeur, Paris: Tresse, p. 320
- Edmond Lepelletier (1886), Les Morts heureuses, preface by Alphonse Daudet, Paris: Tresse et Stock, p. 301
- Edmond Lepelletier (1887), Le Poison allemand..., Paris, p. 18
- Edmond Lepelletier (1888), Deux contes, Bruxelles : Librairie Nouvelle; Paris : Librairie universelle, p. 8
- Edmond Lepelletier (1888), Claire Éverard, Paris: G. Charpentier et Cie, p. 349
- Edmond Lepelletier (1893), Patrie, grand récit historique inédit (tiré du célèbre drame de Victorien Sardou), Paris: A. Fayard, p. 736
- Edmond Lepelletier (1894), Une femme de cinquante ans, Paris: Tresse et Stock, p. 358
- Edmond Lepelletier (1894–1895), Madame Sans-Gêne (roman tiré de la pièce de MM. Victorien Sardou & Émile Moreau), Paris: Librairie illustrée, p. 731
- Edmond Lepelletier (1895), Les trahisons de Marie-Louise [1] La barrière Clichy (épisode complémentaire de «Madame Sans-Gêne»), Paris: à la Librairie illustrée, p. 332
- Edmond Lepelletier (1895), La closerie des genêts (roman inédit, tiré du drame de Frédéric Soulié), Sceaux : impr. de Charaire, pp. 733–1167
- Edmond Lepelletier (1895), Les Trahisons de Marie-Louise, épisode complémentaire de "Madame Sans-Gêne"..., Paris: Librairie illustrée
- Edmond Lepelletier (1896), Les trahisons de Marie-Louise [2] La belle polonaise (épisode complémentaire de «Madame Sans-Gêne»), Paris: à la librairie illustrée, p. 346
- Edmond Lepelletier (1896), Les trahisons de Marie-Louise [3] Les fourberies de Fouché (épisode complémentaire de «Madame Sans-Gêne»), Paris: à la Librairie illustrée, p. 347
- Edmond Lepelletier (1896), Patrie, grand récit historique inédit (tiré du célèbre drame de Victorien Sardou), Paris: Librairie illustrée, p. 354
- Edmond Lepelletier (1897), Fanfan la Tulipe... [1] Deux orphelins, Paris: Librairie illustrée, p. 330
- Edmond Lepelletier (1897), Fanfan la Tulipe... [2] Soldat et marquise, Paris: Librairie illustrée, p. 306
- Edmond Lepelletier (1898), Fanfan la Tulipe... [3] Les amours de Louis XV, Paris: Librairie illustrée, p. 289
- Edmond Lepelletier; Clément Rochel (1898), Les amours de Don Juan (roman inédit), Paris: P. Lamm, p. 229
- Edmond Lepelletier (1898), Martyr des Anglais ! épilogue de "Madame Sans-Gêne", Paris: Montgredien
- Edmond Lepelletier (1899), Le Fils de Napoléon, épilogue de "Martyr des Anglais !", Paris: Montgredien, p. 355
- Edmond Lepelletier (1899), Les grands succès dramatiques "Fualdès"; "Le fils de la nuit", Paris: Librairie illustrée, p. 1028
- Pierre Decourcelle; Edmond Lepelletier (29 December 1899), Performance : A perpète, Cast: Léon Noël (Giraud), J. Renot (Morel), Suzanne Munte (La Rouge), Paris : Théâtre de l'Ambigu
- Edmond Lepelletier (1900), Edmond Lepelletier. Le Serment d'Orsini..., Paris: Montgredien
- Edmond Lepelletier (1900), Le serment d'Orsini [1] Un caprice de Napoléon III, Paris: Montgredien, p. 334
- Edmond Lepelletier (1900), Le serment d'Orsini [2] Le clairon de Magenta, Paris: Montgredien, p. 298
- Edmond Lepelletier (1901), Les deux impératrices [1] La main d'argent, Paris: Montgredien, p. 372
- Edmond Lepelletier (1901), Les deux impératrices [2] Couronne brisée, Paris: Montgredien, p. 336
- Edmond Lepelletier (1902), Le dernier Napoléon [1] Le roman d'une institutrice, Paris: J. Tallandier, p. 402
- Edmond Lepelletier (1902), Le dernier Napoléon [2] Dans les hautes herbes, Paris: J. Tallandier, p. 300
- Edmond Lepelletier (1904), Aux pays conquis, notes sur l'Alsace-Lorraine, Paris: A. Michel, p. 316
- Edmond Lepelletier (1907), Paul Verlaine sa vie, son oeuvre..., Paris: Société du "Mercure de France", p. 568
- Edmond Lepelletier (1908), Émile Zola sa vie, son oeuvre, Paris: Mercure de France, p. 492
- Edmond Lepelletier (1908), L'Etranger, pièce inédite en 1 acte (Extr. fact. de "Je sais tout", 15 janvier 1908), pp. 795–812
- Pierre Decourcelle; Edmond Lepelletier; Léon Xanrof (1909), A perpète ! (drame en 5 actes et 8 tableaux), Paris: P. V. Stock, p. 233
- Edmond Lepelletier (1910), Madame Sans-Gêne (roman tiré de la pièce de MM. Victorien Sardou et Émile Moreau), Paris: J. Tallandier, p. 128
- Edmond Lepelletier (1911), Madame Sans-Gêne 2 la Maréchale, Paris: J. Tallandier, p. 127
- Edmond Lepelletier (1911), Madame Sans-Gêne 3 le Roi de Rome, Paris: J. Tallandier, p. 128
- Edmond Lepelletier (1911–1913), "Histoire de la Commune de 1871", Mercure de France, Paris
- Edmond Lepelletier (1913), Le Neveu de l'Empereur, récit historique, Paris: J. Tallandier, p. 375
- Edmond Lepelletier (1923), Paul Verlaine sa vie, son oeuvre, Paris: Mercure de France, p. 562

== Sources ==
- Edmond Lepelletier (in French), Assemblée nationale
- Edmond Lepelletier (1846-1913) (in French), BnF: Bibliotheque nationale de France
- Hutton, Patrick H. (1981), The Cult of the Revolutionary Tradition: The Blanquists in French Politics, 1864-1893, University of California Press, ISBN 978-0-520-04114-1
- Jacoby, Henry (1973), The Bureaucratization of the World, University of California Press, ISBN 978-0-520-02083-2
- Jolly, Jean, ed. (1960), "Lepelletier (Edmone)", dictionnaire des parlementaires français de 1889 à 1940, Presses universitaires de France
- Jolly, Jean, ed. (1960b), "Roche (Ernest, Jean)", dictionnaire des parlementaires français de 1889 à 1940, Presses universitaires de France
- Lanier, Doris (2004-03-22), Absinthe--The Cocaine of the Nineteenth Century: A History of the Hallucinogenic Drug and Its Effect on Artists and Writers in Europe and the United States, McFarland, ISBN 978-0-7864-1967-8
- White, Edmund (2009-08-01), Rimbaud: The Double Life of a Rebel, Atlantic Books, ISBN 978-1-84887-375-9
