= Jean Barnabé Amy =

French sculptor

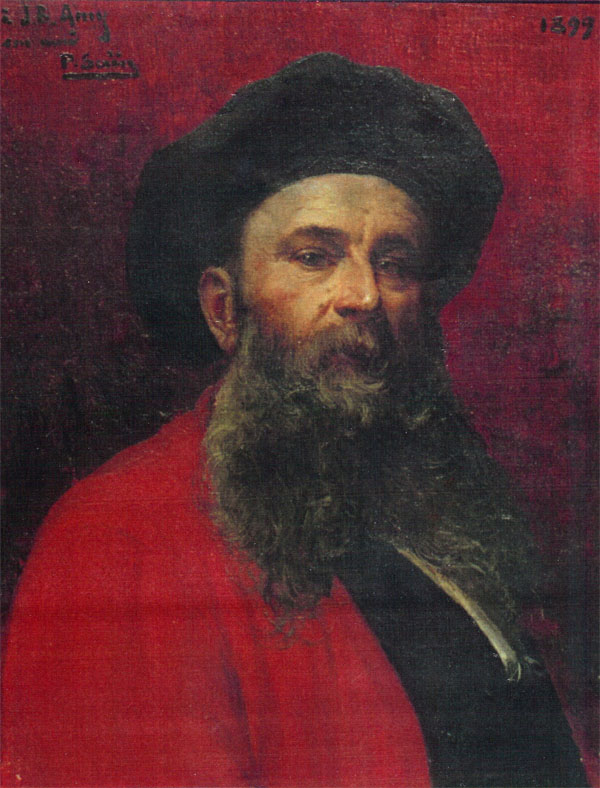
- Portrait of Amy by Paul Saïn
- Born: 11 June 1839; Tarascon, Bouches-du-Rhône, France
- Died: 24 March 1907 (aged 67); Paris, France
- Occupation: Sculptor

Jean Barnabé Amy (11 June 1839 – 24 March 1907) was a French sculptor who mainly specialized in bas relief. He was close to members of the Félibrige, a society that promoted Provençal culture, and often made statues, busts or reliefs of members of this society.

== Life ==
Jean-Barnabé Amy was born in Tarascon, Bouches-du-Rhône, on 11 June 1839. His parents were Jean Amy (born 1800), a laborer, and Marthe Reynaud (born 1802), a daily maid. He studied at the École des Beaux-Arts in Marseille from 1859. He then studied under Bonnassieux and Dumont at the École des Beaux-Arts in Paris, where he was awarded a medal in 1868.

Amy made his debut at the Salon of 1868 with The Muse of Ponsard, now held by the Tarascon town hall, and The Punishment. He continued to exhibit at the Salon until his death in 1907. His Dévéria, a plaster bust, was exhibited there posthumously. In 1873 he won a contest run by the newspaper Le Figaro for a statue of "Figaro" (the Barber of Seville) which now decorates the Figaro building.

Amy was close to members of the Félibrige, and portrayed them many times. Examples are Mistral (marble medallion, Salon of 1872), Les trois Félibriges: Mistral, Roumanille and Aubanel (marble bas relief, Salon of 1875 and Musée Calvet in Avignon). His bronzed plaster bust of the famous Provençal poet Nicolas Saboly (1614–1675) was exhibited in the Salon of 1876 under the incorrect name Jacoby and donated by Amy to the Musée Calvet in 1877. Since no pictures of Saboly were extant it was entirely a work of the imagination. Amy was a co-founder of La Cigale in 1876. In 1877 the Soucieta Felibrenco dé Paris was founded by Batisto Bonnet, Jean Barnabé Amy, Joseph Banquier, Duc-Quercy, Maurice Faure, Louis Gleize and Pierre Grivolas. The society created the journal Lou Viro-Souléu.

In May 1878 two of Amy's work were exhibited in a huge show at the Grand Palais des Champs-Elysées, L'Enfer (terracotta bust) and Monsier Thiers, couronné par le Renommée et par l'Histoire (plaster group). A panel of his masks won an honorable mention at the Exposition Universelle (1900). At this time he was experiencing growing financial difficulties. Jean-Barnabé Amy died in Paris on 24 March 1907. In 1909 his son, Marius, gave the city of Marseille more than 100 works.

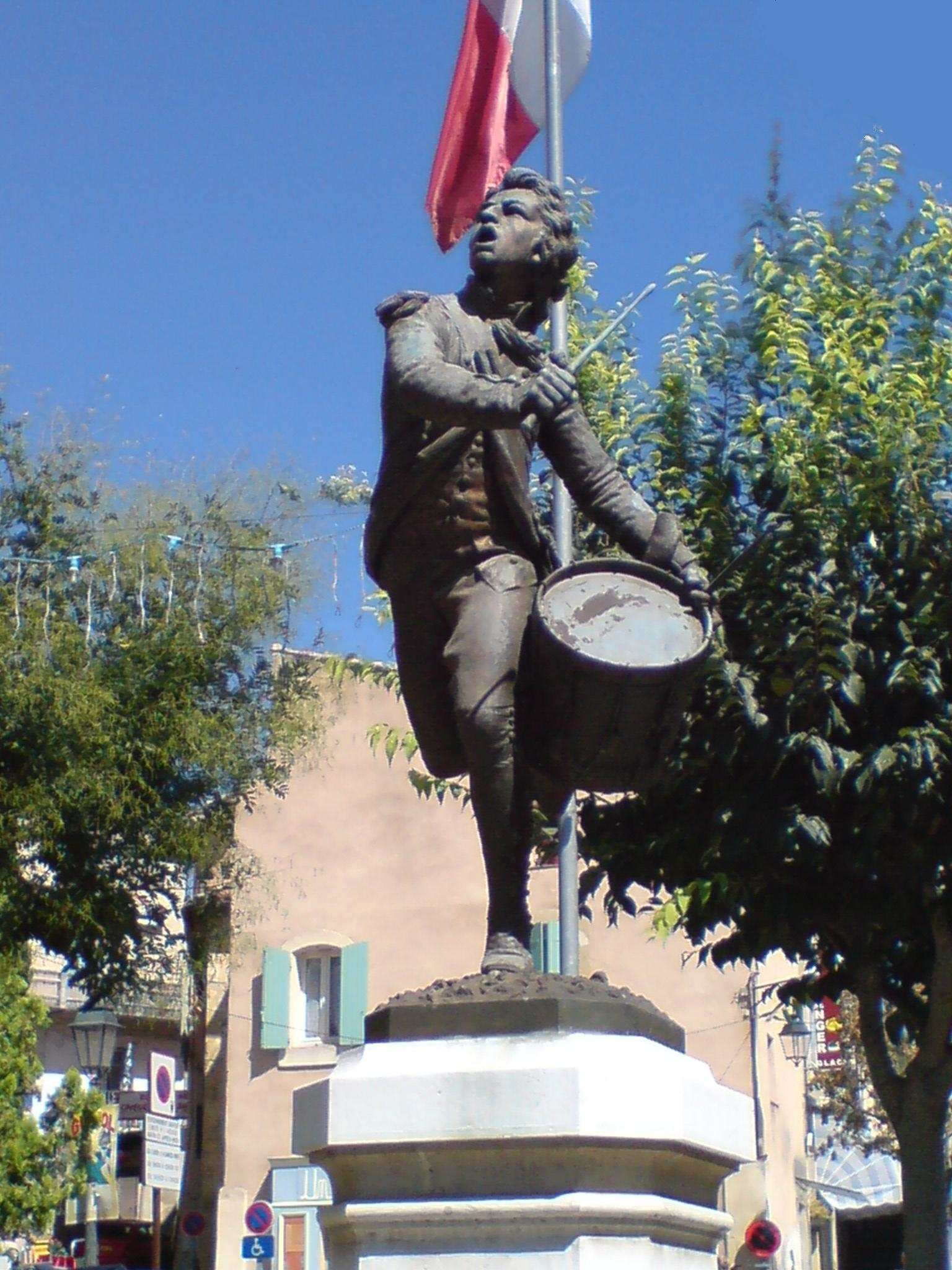
Tambour d'Arcole (1894, Cadenet)

== Work ==
Amy made several monumental works, including:

- Pediment of the Tarascon water tower (1869, destroyed)
- Monument to the Abbé Nicolas Saboly, Provençal poet (1876, Monteux)
- Statue of the historian Jacques Auguste de Thou for the facade of the Hôtel de Ville, Paris (1881)
- Statue of the painter Joseph-Marie Vien for the facade of the Musée Fabre in Montpellier (1882)
- Monument to the explorer Paul Soleillet (1888, Nîmes)
- Monument to the Tambour d'Arcole (1894, Cadenet)
- Monument to the deputy François-Désiré Bancel (1897, Valencia)

However, his work mainly consisted of reliefs of literary figures such as Don Quixote, Mireille and Tartarin de Tarascon, of allegorical scenes such as L'Agriculture, La Tentation and La Rose et le Papillon, or of the grotesque such as La Servitude, L'Intempérance, Lou Ramaniau and La Tarasque. Many of his works are held in the Musée des beaux-arts de Marseille. The Musée du Vieil Aix in Aix-en-Provence holds his Frédéric Mistral (1881, bronze bas-relief). The Musée Calvet in Avignon holds his Joseph Roumanille (1872, plaster bas-relief) and Marc Bonnefoy (1890, bronze bust).

== Publications ==
Amy's publications included:

- Amy, Jean-Barnabé (1994), Tarascon par un Tarasconnais, Nîmes: Impr. C. Lacour, p. 138

== Gallery ==
Works ofJean Barnabé Amy

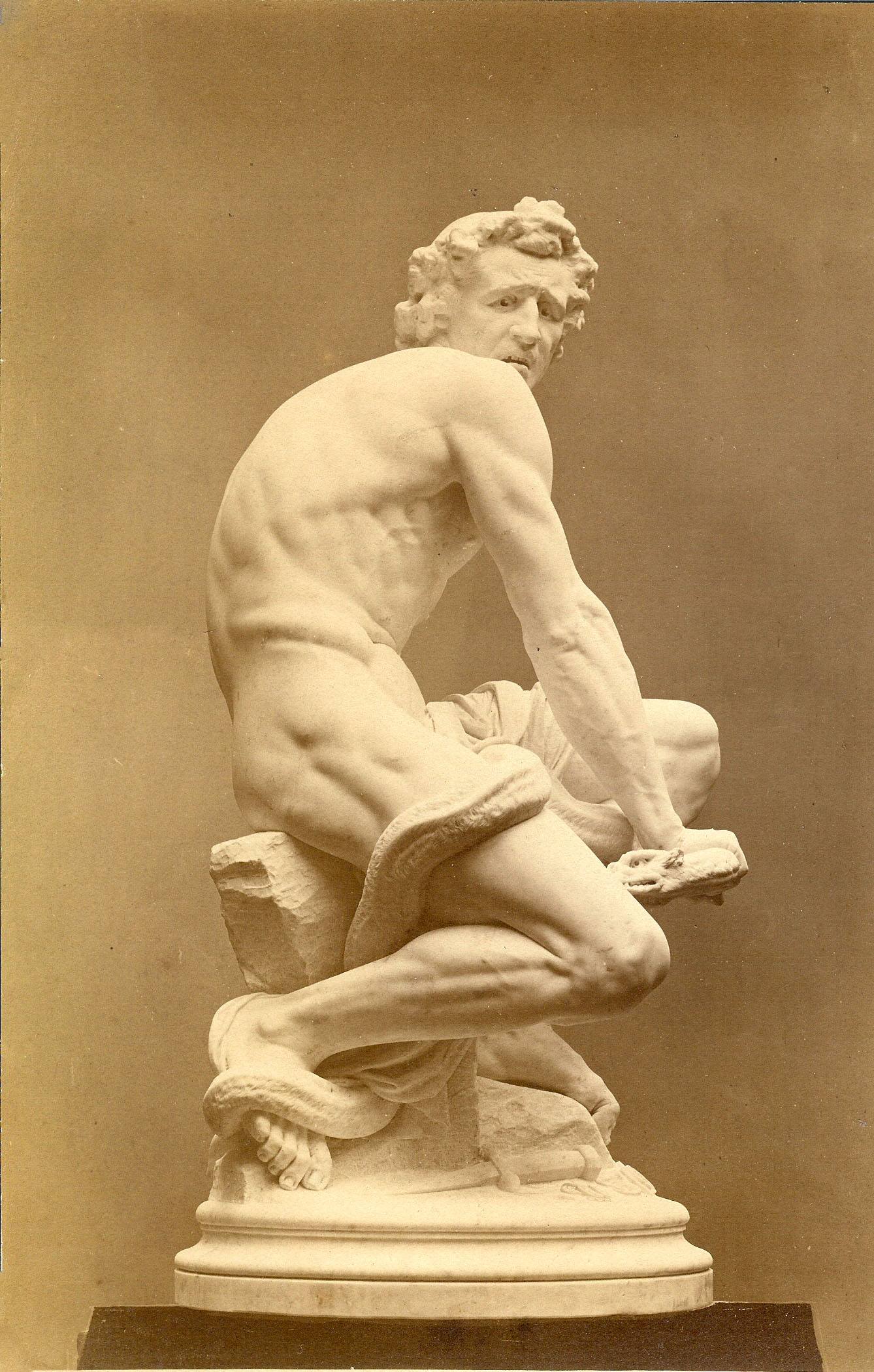
Le Remords, marble, Lunel.

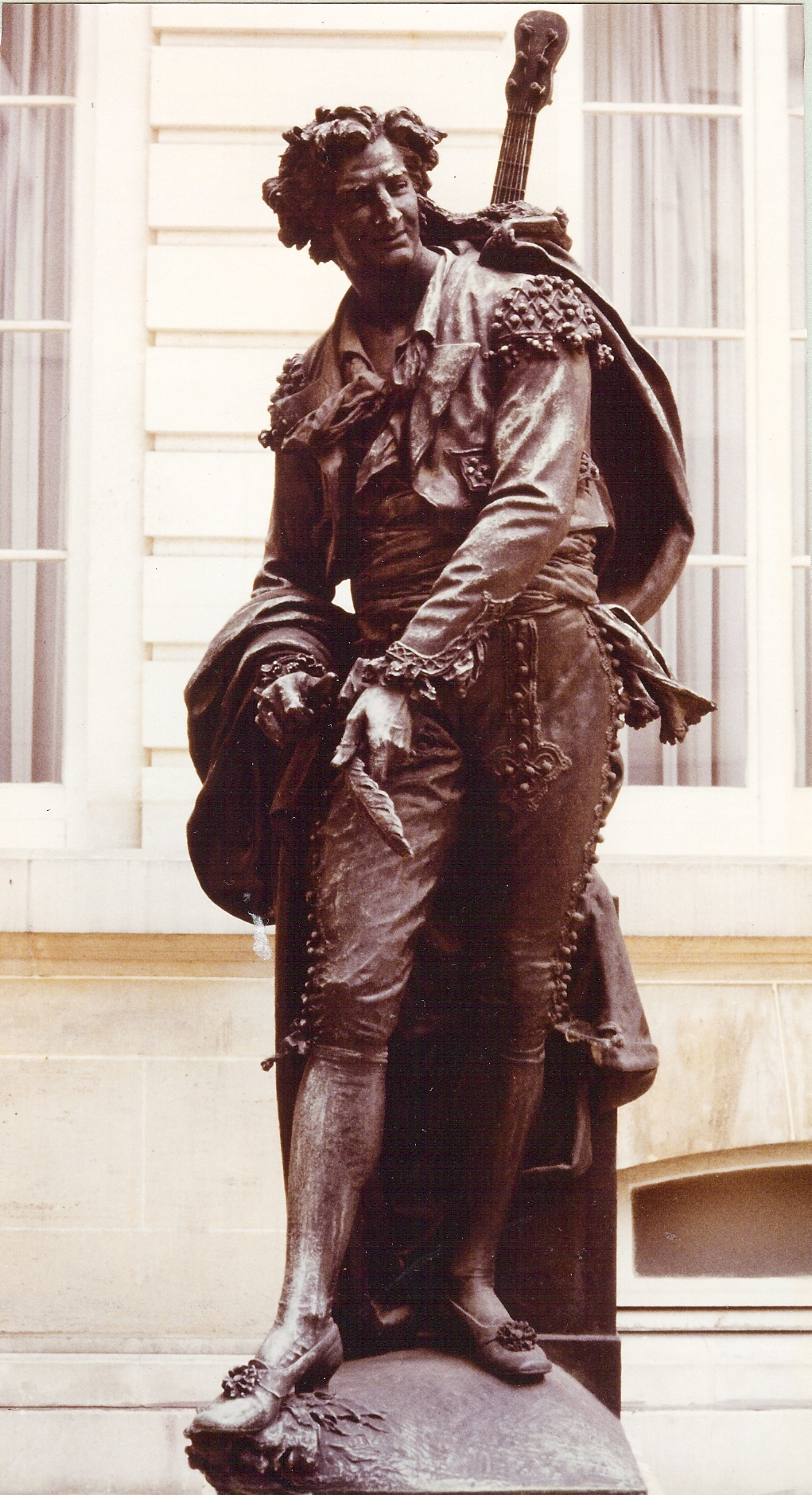
Figaro, localisation inconnue.

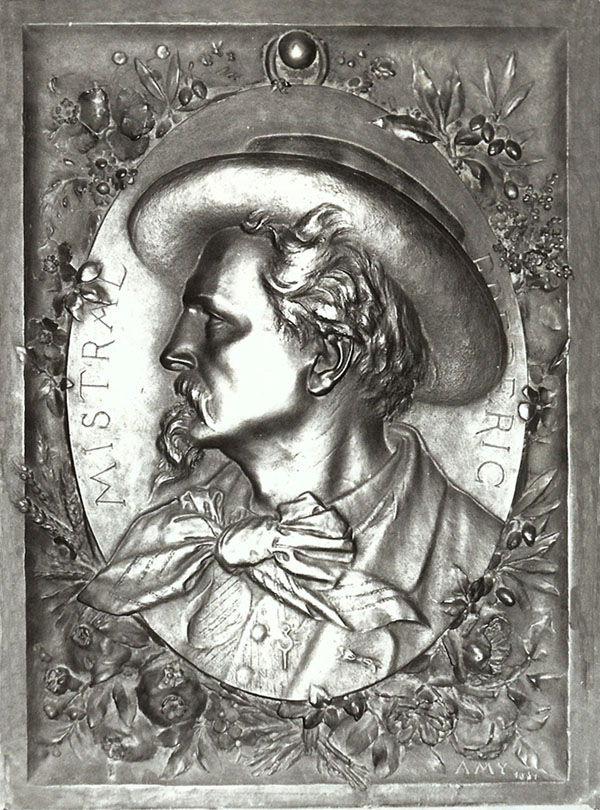
Frédéric Mistral, Aix-en-Provence, Musée du Vieil-Aix.

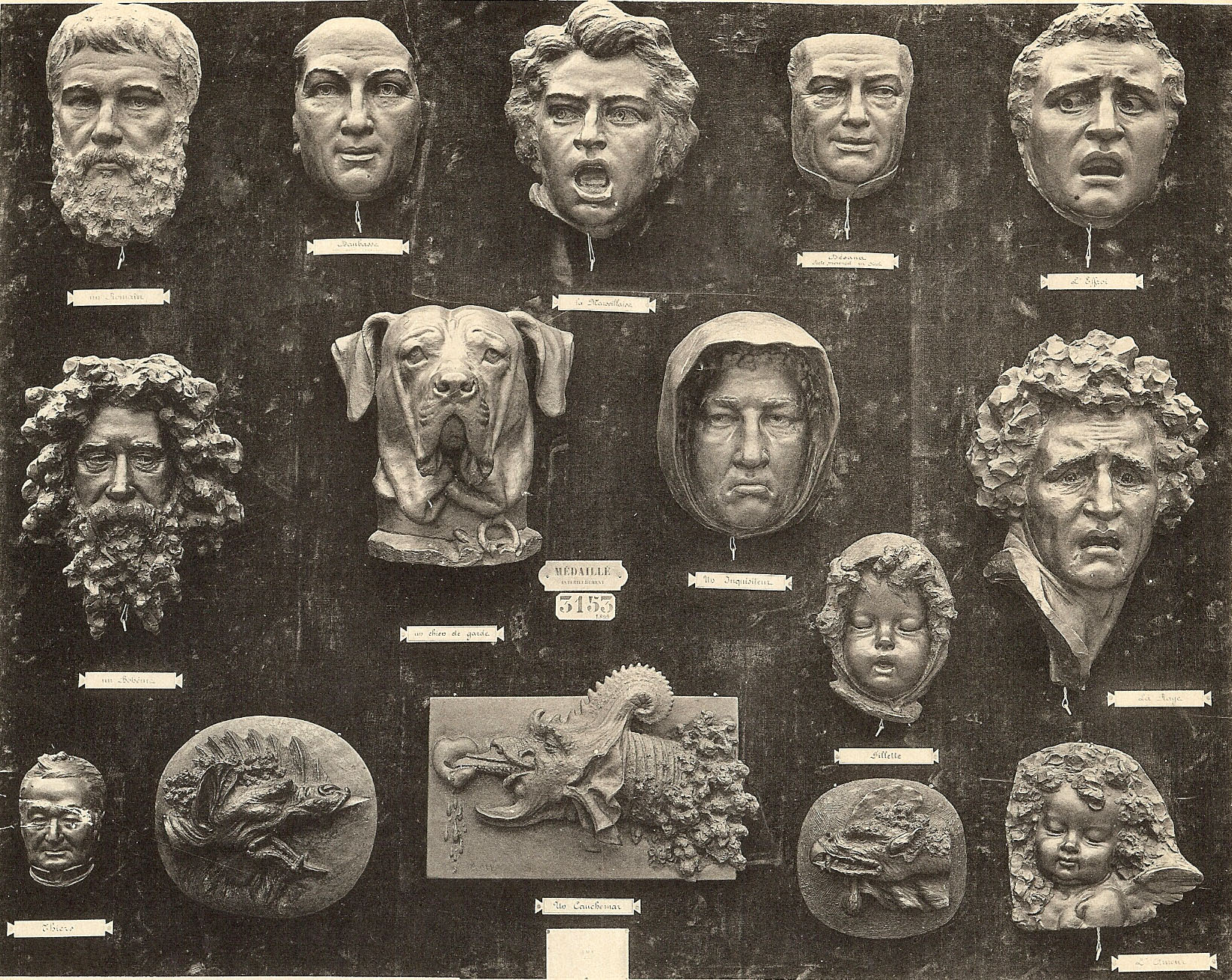
Masques (Salon de 1899).

== Sources ==
- Amayenc, Michel, "Jean Barnabé AMY", geneanet (in French)
- Carnoy, Henry (1987), Dictionnaire biographique international des écrivains, Georg Olms Verlag, ISBN 978-3-487-41058-6
- Deloye, Aug (1881), Notice des statues, bustes, bas-reliefs et autres ouvrages de sculpture de la Renaissance et des temps modernes: exposés dans les galeries du Museum-Calvet à Avignon (in French), Seguin Frères
- Explication des ouvrages de peinture, sculpture, architecture et gravure des artistes vivants (in French), Dubray, 1878
- Genova, André Alauzen Di (2006), "Jean-Barnabé Amy", Dictionnaire des peintres et sculpteurs de Provence, Alpes, Côte d'Azur (in French), Éditions J. Laffitte, archived from the original on 2017-10-27
- Jean-Barnabé Amy (1839–1907) (in French), BnF: Bibliotheque nationale de France
