= Saint-Georges de Bouhélier =

French poet and dramatist

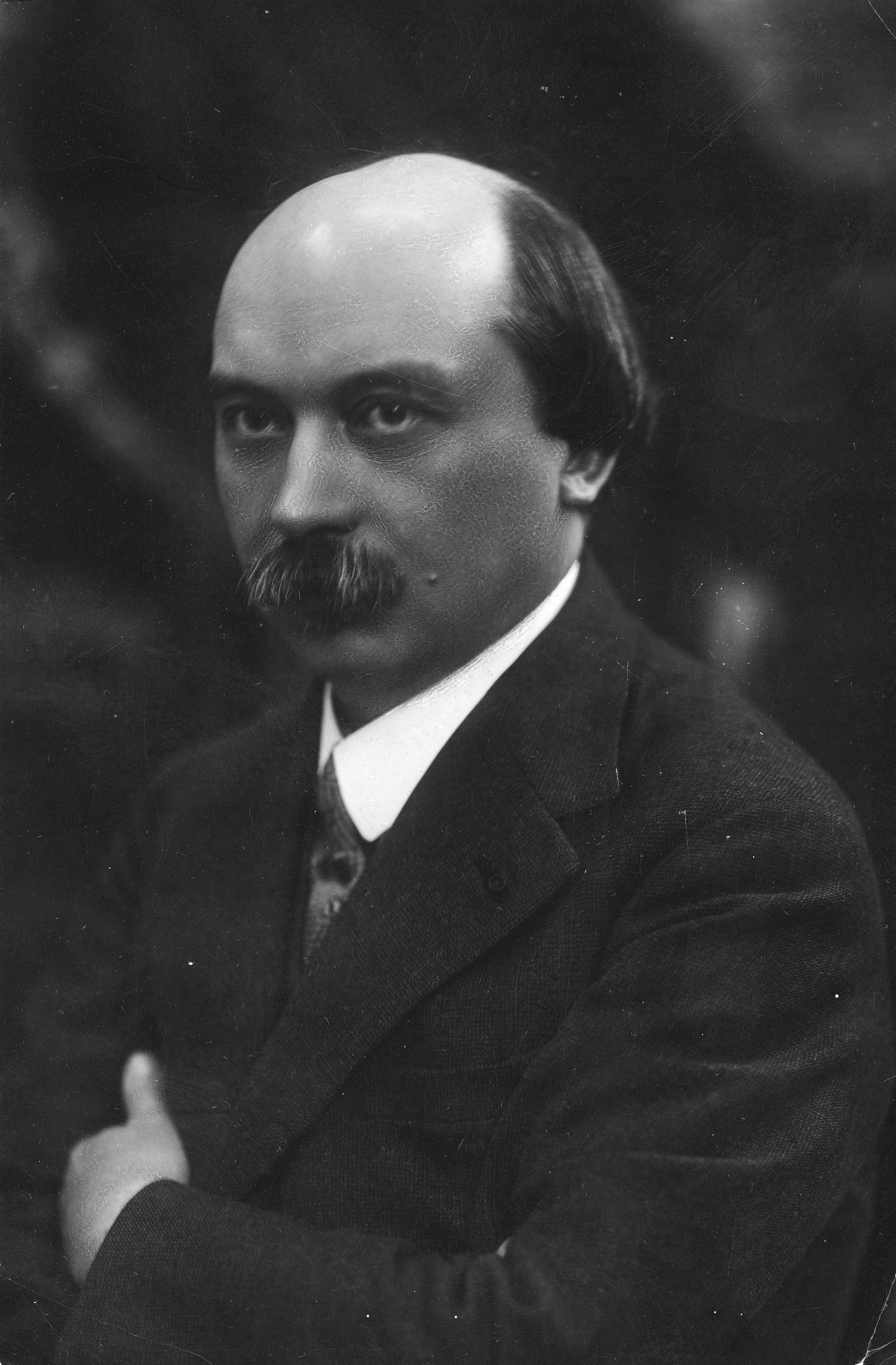

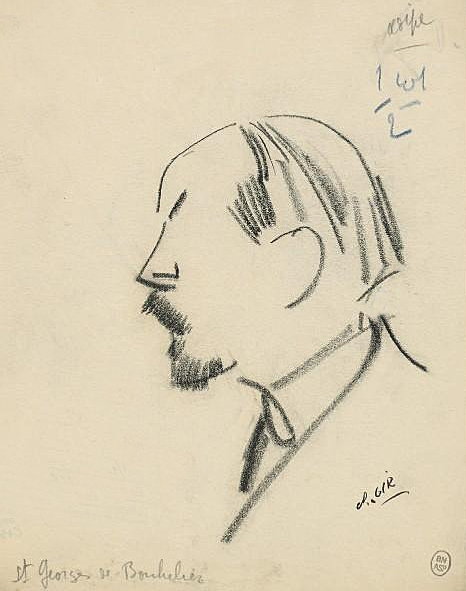
Saint-Georges de Bouhélier by Charles Gir (1919)

Stéphane-Georges Lepelletier de Bouhélier (Rueil 19 May 1876 – Montreux 20 December 1947) known as Saint-Georges de Bouhélier, was a French poet and dramatist.

He was the son of Edmond Lepelletier.

== Works ==
- Chant d'apothéose pour Victor Hugo (for the Hugo centenary) with music by Gustave Charpentier (1902)
- adaption of Sophocles' Oedipus Rex, directed by Firmin Gémier at the Cirque d'Hiver in 1919, London 1920

== See also ==
- Marc Lafargue
