= Pierre Grivolas =

French painter

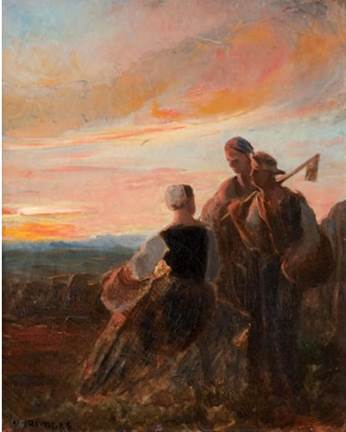
Peasants at Sunset

Pierre Grivolas (2 September 1823, Avignon - 5 February 1906, Avignon) was a French painter; known for landscapes, portraits and genre scenes.

== Biography ==
After displaying an early talent for drawing, his parents enrolled him in art classes. In 1843, he won first prize in the Biennial Design Contest at the Fondation Calvet, which came with a cash award that enabled him to continue his studies in Paris. There, he was a student at the École des Beaux-Arts, where he met and was influenced by Dominique Ingres, Eugène Delacroix and Hippolyte Flandrin. In 1848, at the outbreak of the February Revolution, he returned to Avignon. He became one of the first members of the Félibrige in 1854.

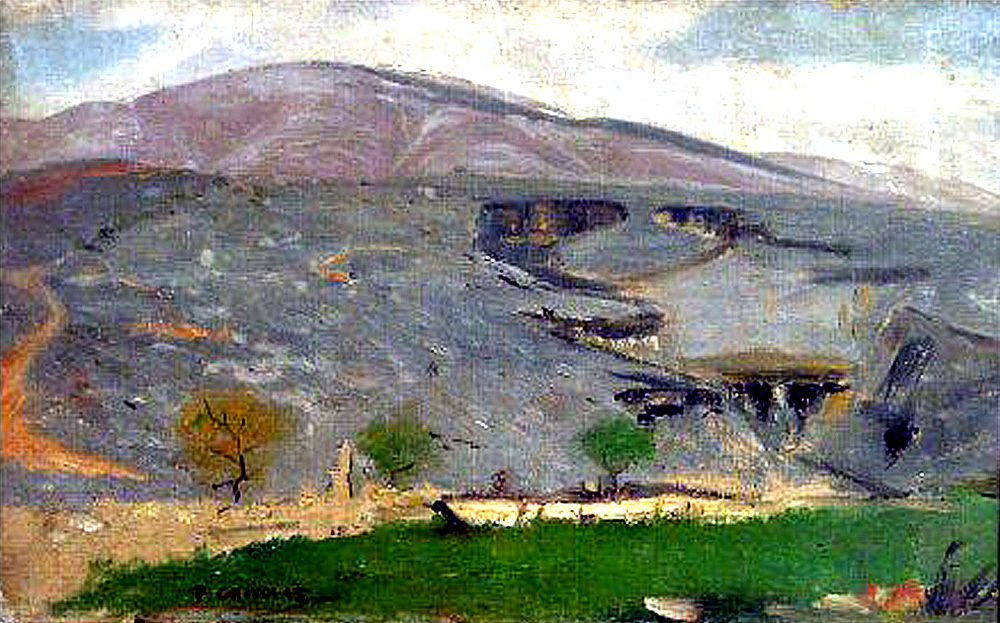
Mont Ventoux

In 1877 the Soucieta Felibrenco dé Paris was founded by Baptiste Bonnet, Jean Barnabé Amy, Joseph Banquier, Antoine Duc (Duc-Quercy), Maurice-Louis Faure, Louis Gleize and Pierre Grivolas. The society created the journal Lou Viro-Souléu. From 1878 until his death, Grivolas was the Director of the École des Beaux-Arts d'Avignon; steering his students away from Academicism by taking them on plein aire excursions to Les Angles and along the Rhône. He is credited with creating the art movement now known as the "Nouvelle école d'Avignon".

In 1894, Grivolas invited his youngest brother, Antoine Grivolas, a still-life painter, to leave his home on the Côte d'Azur and join him at his home near Mont Ventoux, where they lived like shepherds while making sketches. The following year, they moved to Monieux, a small village at the entrance to the Gorges de la Nesque. They spent the next season at Ventouret, near Aurel, attempting to capture the colors of the mountain landscape. A street in Avignon has been named after him.
