= Duc-Quercy =

French journalist and militant socialist

Antoine-Joseph Duc
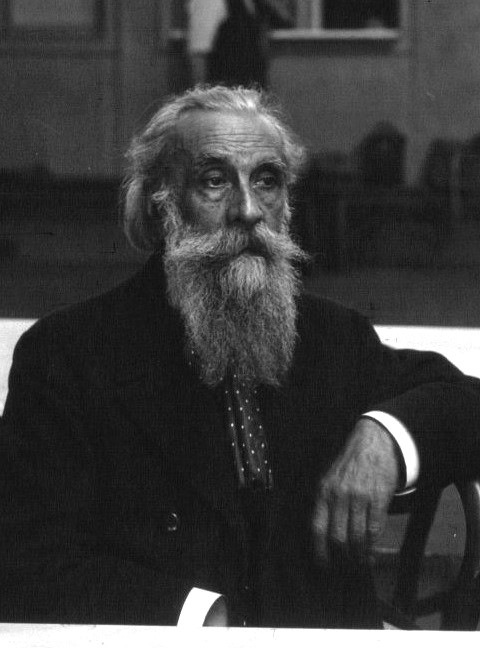
- Duc-Quercy in 1925
- Born: 11 May 1856; Arles, Bouches-du-Rhône, France
- Died: April 1934; Écouen, Paris, France
- Other name: Duc-Quercy
- Occupation: Journalist

Antoine-Joseph Duc (11 May 1856 – April 1934), known as Duc-Quercy and sometimes called Albert Duc-Quercy, (Note: The Arles civil register, 1856 birth register, act no. 290 gives his name as Antoine-Joseph Duc. The Dictionnaire des pseudonymes (1887) gives it (incorrectly) as Albert Duc in "Quercy. One of the editors of the newspaper the Cri du Peuple, very compromised and even condemned during the long strike at Decazeville in 1886. Born Albert Duc; he also signed himself Duc-Quercy." This error is propagated in other sources.) was a French journalist and militant socialist. He was involved in several strikes in the coal mining areas of Aveyron. He twice ran unsuccessfully for election to the legislature as socialist.

== Career ==
Antoine-Joseph Duc was born in 1856. He was a native of Arles, and as a young man was a Provençal poet. He taught French to his fellow-Provençal Batisto Bonnet, who said later Duc-Quercy "looked like a small black bull breathing fire from mouth and nostrils." In 1877 the Soucieta Felibrenco dé Paris was founded by Baptiste Bonnet, Jean Barnabé Amy, Joseph Banquier, Antoine Duc (Duc-Quercy), Maurice Faure, Louis Gleize and Pierre Grivolas. The society created the journal Lou Viro-Souléu.

=== Literary activity ===
Duc-Quercy became a journalist, a member of the French Workers' Party and of the French Section of the Workers' International. He contributed to Paul Lafargue's La Socialiste, the organ of the Guesdist movement. In 1887 the paper was at risk of closing, and Duc-Quercy, Lafarge and Jules Guesde went to Marseille in an attempt to expand circulation. Gabriel Deville donated funds from an inheritance, which kept the paper alive until early February 1888, when it ceased publication until September 1890.

Duc-Quercy was the editor of the Cri du peuple. When interviewing Maurice Maeterlinck in 1891 he said he was opposed to literary writers who "voluntarily isolate themselves, on the pretext of pure art, from the ideas of their time". In Jean Béraud's painting La Madeleine chez le Pharisien (1891) each character is a member of the political or literary world. The face of Christ is that of Duc-Quercy and the face of Simon the Pharisee is that of the writer Ernest Renan. His wife, who wrote under the name "Angèle Duc-Quercy", was also a journalist. She was sentenced to two months in prison in 1891 for having arranged the escape of the Polish nihilist Stanislas Padlewski (1857–91). She contributed to La Revue des revues in 1899.

The first issue of the Marxist journal L'Ère Nouvelle ("The New Era") appeared on 1 July 1893, founded and edited by the Guesdist George Diamandy, with the declared purpose of infusing literature with a message of revolutionary socialism. Contributors included Georgi Plekhanov, Edward Aveling and Gabriel Deville. Georges Sorel joined the editorial staff. Other contributors were Abel Hovelacque, Jean Jaurès, Alexandre Millerand, Lafargue, Guesde and Duc-Quercy. The journal openly provoking the reading public to explore the work of Émile Zola, attacked the "reactionary" critics and also proudly called itself "eclectic".

=== Political activity ===
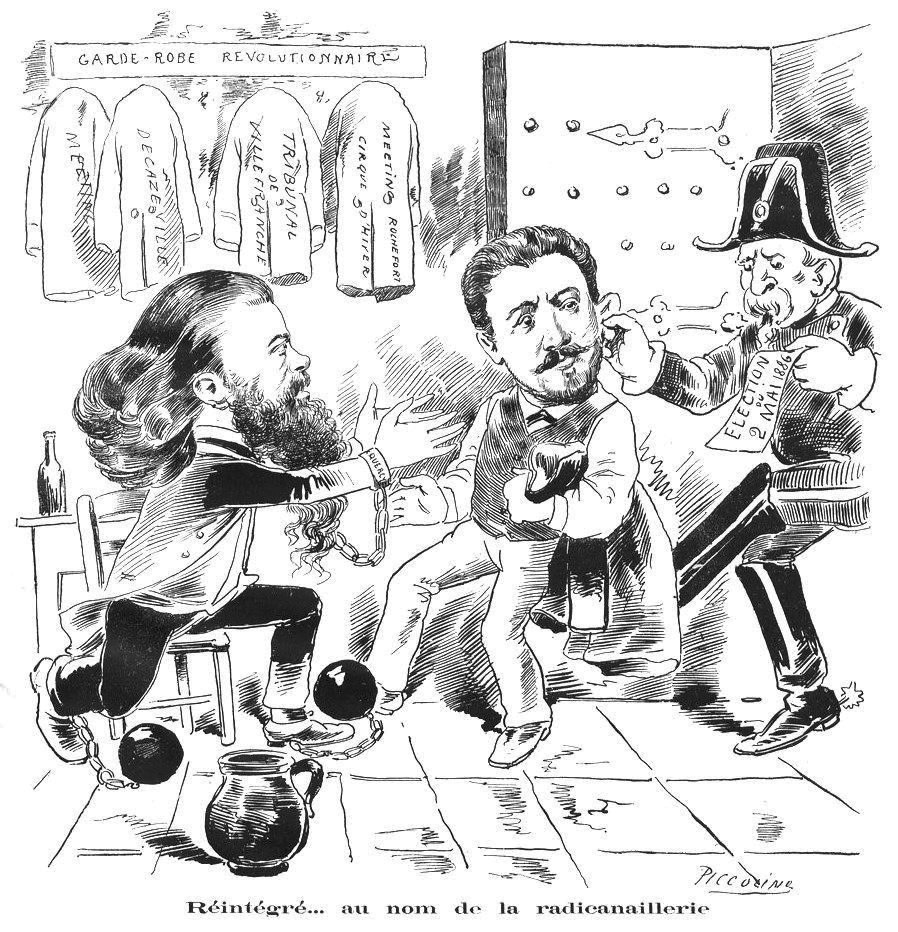
Duc-quercy and Ernest Roche Réintégré... au nom de la radicanaillerie. From La Cravache illustrée, 10 May 1886

A strike began on 26 January 1886 in Decazeville, Aveyron department. among the workers of the Société des Houllères et Fonderies de l'Aveyron. It lasted 108 days and drew national attention. The engineer Watrin was thrown out of a window and died. Duc-Quercy went to Decazeville to support the strike and to draw national attention to the social issues in his Cri de peuple. Ernest Roche of the Intransigeant also went, as did the socialist politicians Zéphyrin Camélinat, Clovis Hugues and Antide Boyer. Duc-Quercy and Ernest Roche were charged by the police. As reported by The Living Age,

M. Roche and M. Duc Quercy were arrested on the charge of having wittingly disseminated false information for the purpose of stirring up the workmen. Alter a scandalous trial, in the course of which M. Laguerre, a deputy, and the reporter of the Budget for Justice, insulted the procurator of the republic in open court, the accused were sentenced to fifteen months' imprisonment. The initial result of the sentence was to make M. Roche a candidate at the Parliamentary election of the 2nd of May; and the government was summoned to release him from prison in order that he might appear on the hustings. The government showed its usual want of resolution. It sent a magistrate to entreat the prisoner to take the necessary steps in order to his being thus provisionally set at liberty. The election gave melancholy proof of the level to which universal suffrage has fallen in the capital. No respectable candidate, no one of any sort of standing. ventured to present himself; and the contest was limited to two journalists of the twelfth rank, and of almost equally extravagant opinions, M. Gautier and M. Roche. M. Gautier was elected ...

The miners of the Compagnie minière de Carmaux held a stormy meeting on 15 August 1892. The strike began the next day and would drag out for ten weeks. Collections were organized to support the miners, whose determination, solidarity and discipline was widely admired by ordinary people. Duc-Quercy and the politicians Pierre Baudin, Alexandre Millerand, René Viviani, and Alfred Léon Gérault-Richard often spoke in Carmaux during the strike. Jean Jaurès, Duc-Quercy and Eugène Baudin said the strike was an attempt to guarantee the political liberties of Carmaux voters. Paul Lafargue of the French Workers' Party saw it as part of the wider "political and economic battle against the bourgeoisie". In 1893 Duc-quercy was candidate for the legislative elections for Decazeville, but was not elected.

On 30 August 1902 another strike began in Decazeville, and spread to Aubin, Cransac and the metallurgical works. The miners found themselves isolated because they were not supported by miners in other basins or by politicians they asked for help such as Guesde and Duc-Quercy. The strike was suppressed on 19 October 1902. When Duc-Quercy ran again as candidate for Decazeville in the elections of 1906 he only obtained 1,835 votes. The poor showing could be attributed to dissension in the local socialist movement after the 1902 strikes.

Antoine-Joseph Duc died in 1934.

== Sources ==
- "Angèle Duc-Quercy (18..-19..): nom d'alliance", BnF: Bibliotheque nationale de France (in French)
- Carnoy, Henry (1987), Dictionnaire biographique international des écrivains, Georg Olms Verlag, ISBN 978-3-487-41058-6
- Chapuis (1893), "Chronique", Polybiblion: revue bibliographique universelle (in French), E. de Boccard
- Coyne, W. P. (1895), "Batisto Bonnet: A Provence Peasant", The New Ireland Review, New Ireland Review Office
- Derfler, Leslie (30 June 2009), Paul Lafargue and the Flowering of French Socialism, 1882–1911, Harvard University Press, ISBN 978-0-674-03422-8
- "État civil d'Arles, registre des naissances de 1856. Acte no 290", Archives en ligne des Bouches-du-Rhône
- Fonvieille-Vojtovic, Aline (1993), Paul Ramadier, 1888–1961: élu local et homme d'état (in French), Publications de la Sorbonne, ISBN 978-2-85944-226-2
- Goldberg, Harvey (1958), "Jaurès and the Carmaux Strikes: The Coal Strike of 1892", The American Journal of Economics and Sociology, 17 (2), JSTOR 3484674
- Guyaux, André (2007), Echanges épistolaires franco-belges (in French), Presses Paris Sorbonne, ISBN 978-2-84050-511-2
- Heilly, Georges d’ (1887), Dictionnaire des pseudonymes, nouvelle éd. augmentée, Paris: Dentu
- Jean Béraud : La Madeleine chez le Pharisien (in French), Musée d'Orsay, 2006
- Merriman, John M. (1 March 2016), The Dynamite Club: How a Bombing in Fin-de-Siècle Paris Ignited the Age of Modern Terror, Yale University Press, ISBN 978-0-300-21793-3
- Monod, G. (1886), "Contemporary Life and Thought in France", The Living Age, Living Age Company, Incorporated
- Scott, Joan Wallach (1974), The Glassworkers of Carmaux: French Craftsmen and Political Action in a Nineteenth-century City, Harvard University Press, ISBN 978-0-674-35440-1
- Voisin, André (1894), "Revue des périodiques. L'Ère Nouvelle", Revue Internationale de Sociologie (in French), II: 405–406
