= Jean Henri Georges Laguerre =

French lawyer and politician

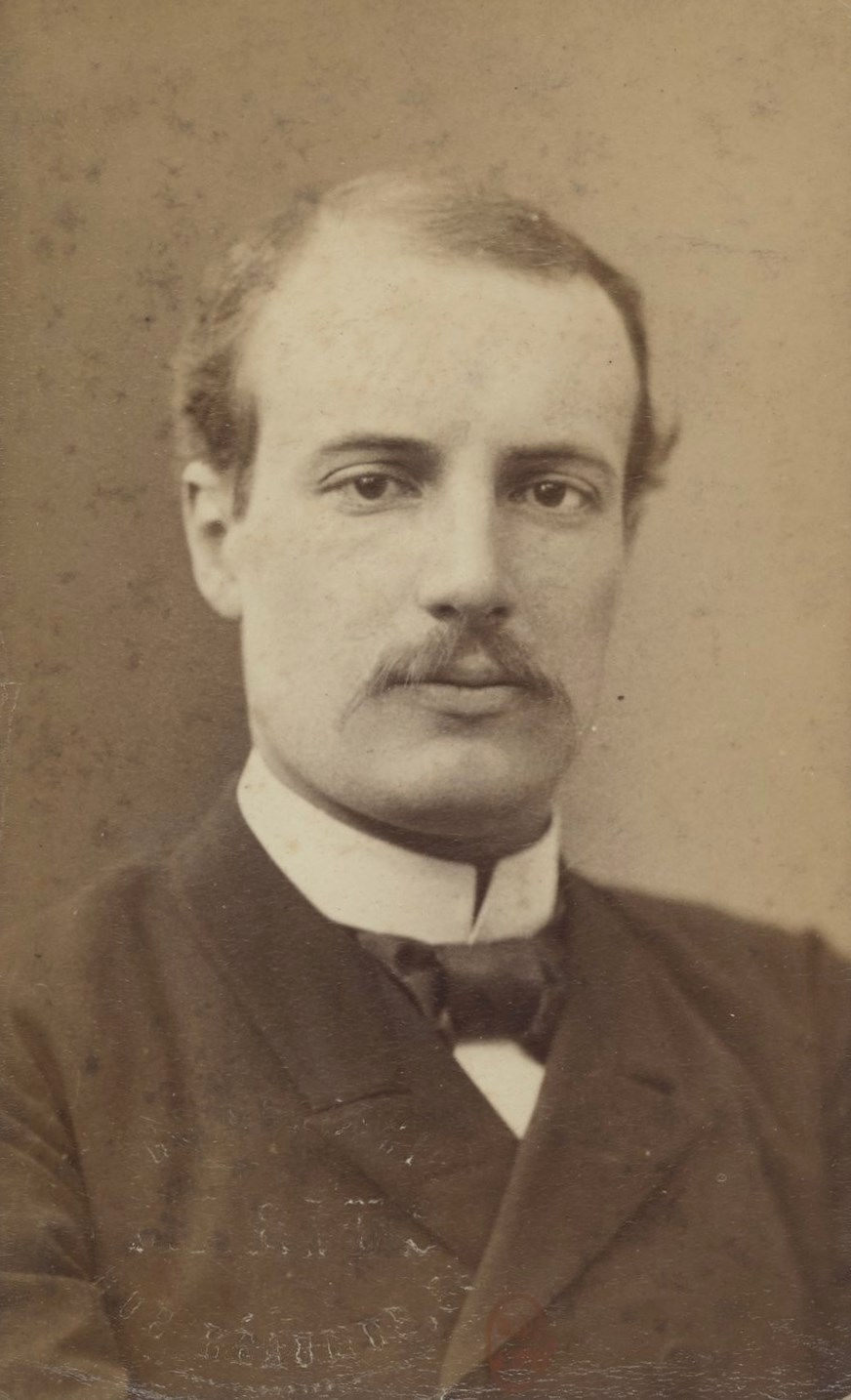
Laguerre, Georges in 1888

Jean Henri Georges Laguerre (24 June 1858 - 17 June 1912) was a French lawyer and politician.

Born in Paris, he was called to the bar in 1879 and distinguished himself by brilliant pleadings in favour of socialist and anarchist leaders, defending Prince Kropotkine at Lyon in 1883, and Louise Michel in the same year. In 1886, with Alexandre Millerand as a colleague, he defended Ernest Roche and Duc Quercy, the instigators of the Decazeville strike. His strictures on the procureur de la Republique on this occasion being declared libellous he was suspended for six months and in 1890 he again incurred suspension for an attack on the attorney-general, Quesnay de Beaurepaire.

He pleaded in the greatest criminal cases of his time, but from 1893 onwards exclusively in the provinces, his exclusion from the Parisian bar having been secured on the pretext of his connection with La Presse. He entered the Chamber of Deputies for Apt in 1883 as a representative of the extreme revisionist programme, and was one of the leaders of the Boulangist agitation. He had formerly written for Georges Clemenceau's organ La Justice, but when Clemenceau refused to impose any shibboleth on the radical party he became director of La Presse. He rallied to the republican party in May 1891 some months before General Boulanger's suicide. He was not re-elected to the Chamber in 1893.

Laguerre was an excellent lecturer on the revolutionary period of French history, concerning which he had collected many valuable and rare documents. He interested himself in the fate of the "Little Dauphin" (Louis XVII), whose supposed remains, buried at Ste Marguerite, proved to be those of a boy of fourteen.
