= Thermidor (disambiguation) =

Thermidor was a month in the French Republican calendar.

- Thermidor (play) is a dramatic play by the 19th-century French playwright Victorien Sardou, named after the month.
  - Lobster Thermidor is a French dish made of lobster, named after the play.
- The Thermidorian Reaction or 9 Thermidor was a revolt in the French Revolution.
- Thérésa Tallien was called Notre-Dame du Thermidor.
- Thermidor Records is a defunct record label founded by Joe Carducci.
- A competitive robot in Robot Wars as Thermidor 2.

== See also ==
- Thermador
