= Eugène Baudin =

French porcelain worker and left-wing politician

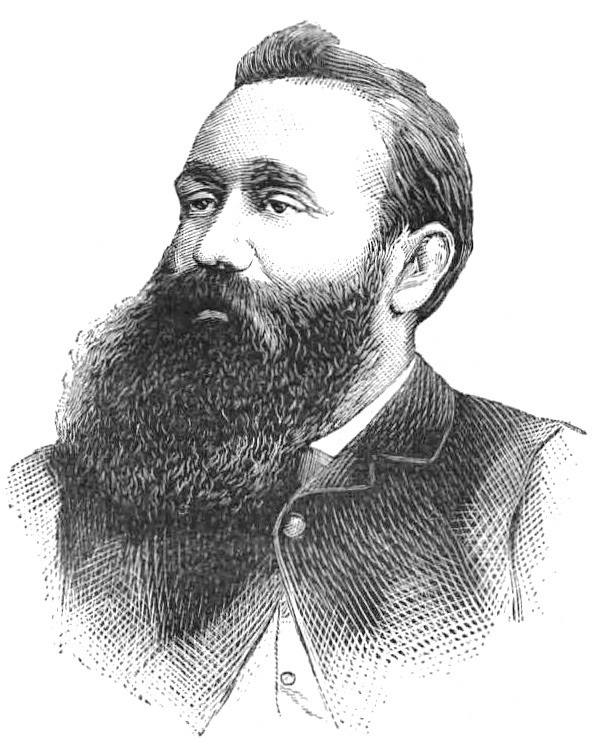
- Baudin in 1893

Deputy of Cher
- In office 6 October 1889 – 31 May 1898

Personal details
- Born: 29 August 1853 Vierzon, Cher. France
- Died: 11 April 1918 (aged 64) Granges-sur-Aube, Marne, France
- Occupation: Porcelain worker, politician

Eugène Baudin (29 August 1853 – 11 April 1918) was a French porcelain worker and left-wing politician. He became an activist at an early age, and was forced into exile for his activities during the Paris Commune. After returning to France he was arrested twice for his activism before being elected to the legislature for two terms. At first enthusiastic, he became disillusioned and declined to run for reelection in 1898. He returned to porcelain making, and died in obscurity.

== Early years (1853–84) ==
Eugène Baudin was born on 29 August 1853 in Vierzon, Cher. He was the son of a porcelain worker who had a large family. He attended the commune's school until he was ten years old, then became an apprentice at the porcelain factory of M. Bazille in Vierzon. While very young he was influenced by the views of Louis Auguste Blanqui and became a revolutionary socialist. While 17 years old he fought against the official candidate in the 1869 legislative elections. After the election he was condemned to two months in prison for contempt of the emperor.

After Baudin had completed his sentence his employer refused to rehire him. He moved to Paris, where he joined the First International and participated in the events of 4 September 1870 when the Government of National Defense was proclaimed. He enlisted on 7 September 1870 and served in the Francs-tireurs and then the artillery during the Siege of Paris. After the siege he returned to Vierzon. When he heard that troops from Bourges would be going through Vierzon to fight people of Limousin who had declared for the Commune, Baudin assembled several hundred local people to stop them. The next day he led a dozen friends to Paris, where he joined the Commune, fought at Fort d'Issy and was made an officer.

After the failure of the Commune Baudin was condemned in absentia. He went into exile with Édouard Vaillant, first in Switzerland, then in Germany and England. In England he obtained a job as a porcelain worker and married. He could not return to France until the amnesty of 1881.

== Local politics (1881–89) ==
Location of Vierzon, Cher, France

Baudin returned to France in 1881. In 1884 he was elected municipal councilor for Vierzon-Ville and for Vierzon-Village. He chose to represent Vierzon-Ville. In 1885 he ran for election to the legislature as socialist candidate on the list of Félix Pyat-Vaillant, and won 17,000 votes, but was defeated. That year he was elected to the General Council of Cher for the canton of La Guerche.

When strikes broke out in Vierzon, particularly at the Société française de matériel agricole, Baudin strongly supported the workers. He was arrested on 3 October 1885 for having resisted a gendarme who, according to Baudin's friends, was mistreating a woman. The tribunal at Bourges condemned Baudin to two months in prison and the loss of his civil rights for five years. On appeal the judgement was confirmed. His election to the General Council was annulled due to his conviction. After 92 days in prison Baudin returned to Vierzon, and three days later he was reelected councilor. The council made him deputy mayor.

Baudin decided to sit in the General Council of Cher. By order of the Prefect he was asked to leave, but refused. Policemen led by a commissioner entered the General Council room and expelled him. Three months later he was reelected to the General Council for La Guerch in the first round, with his expenses covered by subscriptions from twenty deputies and from his friend. His election was again annulled due to his conviction. He was again physically expelled from the council, and was finally obliged to capitulate and refrain from running in new elections due to lack of money. By his account he continued to advise citizens to support the republic and continued to defend workers against employers in the courts. His workshop was filled with citizens who came to ask his advice.

== Deputy: first term (1889–93) ==
The Socialist Congress ask Baudin to run in the 1889 legislative elections as its candidate in the 2nd constituency of Bourges or the 2nd constituency of Saint-Amand. He chose Bourges, and ran as a Blanquist, but belonged to the section of the socialists who refused to support Boulangism. The elections of 22 September 1889 were inconclusive, but Baudin was elected on the second ballot on 6 October 1889. He was one of two successes for the Marxists claimed by Paul Lafargue, the other being Christophe Thivrier, an ex-miner and municipal councillor for Commentry who had campaigned as a Boulangist and joined the Workers' Party after being elected. However, Friedrich Engels saw the elections as a success, counting Baudin, Thivrier and Félix Lachize as Marxists, and considering that Gustave Paul Cluseret and Ernest Ferroul were "bound to cast in their lot with the first three."

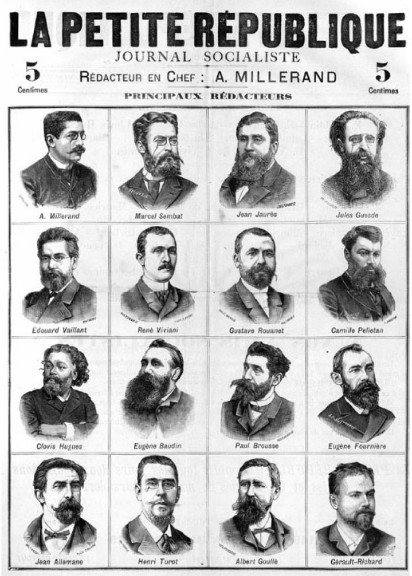
Contributors to Millerand's socialist journal La Petite République. Baudin is 3rd row down,2nd from the left

During this session of parliament Baudin was very active in all socialist demonstrations. On 19 November 1889 Baudin, Joseph Ferroul, Antide Boyer and Valentin Couturier proposed that the mines should be nationalized, and demands for nationalization of regulation grew as strikes spread across France. From 1890 to 1892 Baudin participated in the labour action of the logging unions. He tabled two bills, one on working conditions in match factories, and the other on the intervention of the army between capital and labour. He voted for a credit of 1,600,000 francs for the secret funds of the Sûreté générale, but protested against the use of secret funds to pay agents provocateurs who joined the socialist party. In the discussion over the 1890 accident in the Villeboeuf mine in Saint-Étienne he pointed out the inadequacy of precautions against firedamp explosions. He questioned the Minister of the Interior, Constans, about the brutal action of the police on 7 June 1891 against an authorized socialist demonstration. The demonstrators were laying a wreath in the square near Sacré-Cœur, Paris, where Eugène Varlin, a former member of the Commune, had been shot.

Victorien Sardou's play Thermidor, first staged at the Comedie-Francaise on 24 January 1891, portrayed the revolution from a conservative viewpoint. It presented Danton and Camille Desmoulins as noble republicans, while Saint-Just and Robespierre were absolute villains. On 26 January Baudin was among a group of radicals led by Prosper-Olivier Lissagaray, mostly socialists, who disrupted the performance. In December 1891 the newly-elected socialist deputy Paul Lafargue spoke against the campaign for separation of church and state. This infuriated most left-wing members. Baudin made the bald statement that socialists were republicans and atheists, and Alexandre Millerand said socialists must oppose the church.

When the workers at the Rosières ironworks in Lunery, Cher, went on strike in May 1892 for higher pay and better conditions they immediately telegraphed Baudin and asked him to come and guide the movement. The miners of the Compagnie minière de Carmaux held a stormy meeting on 15 August 1892. The strike began the next day and would drag out for ten weeks. Jean Jaurès, Duc-Quercy and Eugène Baudin said the strike was an attempt to guarantee the political liberties of Carmaux voters. Paul Lafargue saw it as part of the wider "political and economic battle against the bourgeoisie". In the 18 October 1894 session Baudin and Millerand accused Baron René Reille of deliberately prolonging the strike to punish the strikers. Millerand moved that on the basis of the 1810 and 1838 laws the government should seize the mines. In face of this threat Reille agreed to arbitration.

On 1 May 1893, when the government ordered closure of the Labor Exchange (Bourse du Travail), Baudin took part in the protest demonstration. While he was standing with Édouard Vaillant, who had just addressed the crowd, the police charged the demonstrators. Baudin joined with Jean-Baptiste Dumay, Millerand and Thivrier in appealing to the government. He said he had been brutally beaten by the police at the demonstration, and at the police station one of the policemen said of his parliamentary status, "we'll teach you how a deputy is treated." Charles Dupuy, President of the Council and Minister of the Interior, said the police report said Baudin hit the police agents first. Baudin denied this and challenged the government to bring a lawsuit against him. Jean Jaurès sided with Baudin, showed the police account was false and asked the government to respect the rights of the socialist opposition. However, the majority voted to give the government authority to prosecute Baudin.

== Deputy: second term (1893–98) ==
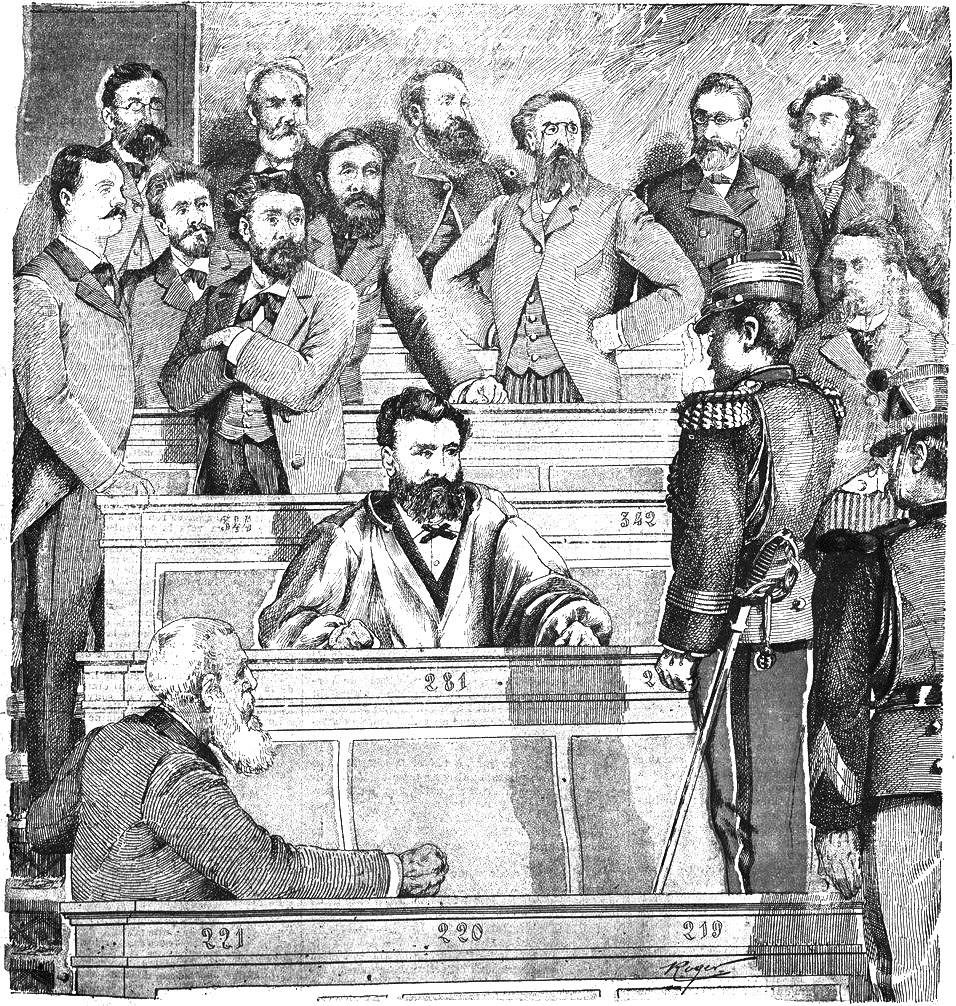
Expulsion of Christophe Thivrier from the Chamber (February 1894). Baudin is in the center of the rear row.

In the 20 August 1893 legislative elections Baudin again ran on the Worker's Party platform, calling for revision of the monarchical constitution of 1875, suppression of the budget for religion, return of church property to the nation, election of magistrates, statutory limits to working hours, a minimum wage, a pension fund for the elderly and an agricultural credit organization. He was elected on the first ballot. He had been sponsored by Édouard Vaillant's Central Revolutionary Committee (CRC), which became a constituent element of the Socialist Union. The other elected CSC deputies were Vaillant himself and Emmanuel Chauvière.

On 1 June 1894 managers at the Graissessac mines responded to a strike vote by firing about 250 workers. Despite provocation, the strike remained peaceful. 133 strikers were arrested but only 9 were convicted for more than making "menaces". The strikers eventually ran out of money, and Baudin convinced a meeting of strikers on 28 August 1894 to return to work.

Baudin held office until 31 May 1898. He was not active in the chamber apart from proposing a bill in 1897 to protect the interests of workers in sugar refineries. At the end of his term Baudin was tired and disillusioned, and did not run again. He remained a member of the Socialist Revolutionary Party, and contributed to the journal La démocratie de l'Ouest. On 14 July 1899 he signed the Socialist manifesto against the entry of Millerand into the cabinet of Pierre Waldeck-Rousseau. After this he seems to have abandoned politics

== Last years (1898–1918) ==
Eugène Baudin's younger brother, Ernest Baudin, was also a ceramist. From 1891 to 1900 Eugène Baudin's address is given as 2bis19 rue de la Quintinie, next door to Ernest Baudin's ceramic workshop. It is possible that the two brothers collaborated between 1889 and 1892, when Ernest was appointed Director of Production at the Manufacture nationale de Sèvres. Eugène may have continued to work at his brother's former studio from 1892 to 1898.

Baudin moved to Saint-Briac-sur-Mer, Ille-et-Vilaine, Brittany in 1898 for health reasons. There he opened a ceramic workshop where he made "soft sandstones, fired on iridescent porcelain, with metallic reflections." (grès tendres, flammés sur porcelaines irisées, reflets métalliques). These include a series of faience medallions with blue glaze drawn by the sculptor Théophile Camel (1863–1911). His work received positive comments from the art critic Roger Marx (1859–1913). Baudin then settled in Monaco where he continued to make pottery.

Eugène Baudin died on 11 April 1918 in Granges-sur-Aube, Marne. He was aged 64.

== Publications ==
- Baudin; Boyer; Cluseret (1890), Proposition de loi contre l'intervention de l'armée entre le capital et le travail (19 Novembre 1889), Paris: Motteroz / France. Chambre des députés
- Baudin; Boyer; Cluseret (1890), Proposition de loi sur les conditions du travail dans les fabriques d'allumettes chimiques (25 Novembre 1889), Paris: Motteroz / France. Chambre des députés
- Dumay; Baudin; Baulard (1891), Proposition de loi relative à l'abrogation des articles 414 et 415 du Code pénal (atteinte à la liberté du travail (20 October 1891), Paris: Motteroz / France. Chambre des députés
- Pierre Richard; Baudin; Borie (1893), Proposition de loi ayant pour objet de faire bénéficier des dispositions de la loi du 9 juin 1853 sur les pensions de retraite, les ouvriers, ouvrières et employés civils des manufactures et des arsenaux militaires ressortissant à l'administration de la guerre (21 November 1892), Paris: Motteroz / France. Chambre des députés
- Baudin; Antide Boyer; Calvinhac; Carnaud (1897), Proposition de loi relative à l'organisation du monopole de la raffinerie et à la réglementation de la production du sucre en vue de protéger les intérêts des travailleurs agricoles et industriels (16 January 1897), Paris: Motteroz / France. Chambre des députés

== Sources ==
- Arthur, Paul (2011), "Les céramistes du 24, rue de la Quintinie : Baudin, Wolf, Mougin" (PDF), Revue de la Société des Amis du Musée National de Céramique (in French) (20)
- Bertrand, Alphonse (1893), "BAUDIN (Eugène)", La Chambre de 1893: biographies des 581 députés (in French), chez Quantin
- Derfler, Leslie (2009-06-30), Paul Lafargue and the Flowering of French Socialism, 1882-1911, Harvard University Press, ISBN 978-0-674-03422-8
- Eugène Baudin (in French), Assemblée nationale
- Goldberg, Harvey (1958), "Jaurès and the Carmaux Strikes: The Coal Strike of 1892", The American Journal of Economics and Sociology, 17 (2): 167–178, doi:10.1111/j.1536-7150.1958.tb00239.x, JSTOR 3484674
- Goldberg, Harvey (1962), The Life of Jean Jaurès, Univ of Wisconsin Press, ISBN 978-0-299-02564-9
- Hutton, Patrick H. (1981), The Cult of the Revolutionary Tradition: The Blanquists in French Politics, 1864-1893, University of California Press, ISBN 978-0-520-04114-1
- Johnson, Christopher H. (1995), The Life and Death of Industrial Languedoc, 1700-1920, Oxford University Press, ISBN 978-0-19-504508-6
- Jolly, Jean (1960), "Baudin (Eugène)", dictionnaire des parlementaires français de 1889 à 1940 (in French)
- Judt, Tony (2011), Marxism and the French Left: Studies on Labour and Politics in France, 1830-1981, NYU Press, ISBN 978-0-8147-4393-5
- McWilliam, Neil (2000), Monumental Intolerance: Jean Baffier, a Nationalist Sculptor in Fin-de-Siècle France, Penn State Press, ISBN 0-271-04394-6
- Scott, Joan Wallach (1974), The Glassworkers of Carmaux: French Craftsmen and Political Action in a Nineteenth-century City, Harvard University Press, ISBN 978-0-674-35440-1
