= Thermidor =

11th month in the French Republican Calendar, from mid-July to mid-August

Thermidor (French pronunciation: [tɛʁmidɔʁ]) was the eleventh month in the French Republican calendar. The month was named after the French word thermal, derived from the Greek word thermos 'heat'.

Thermidor was the second month of the summer quarter (mois d'été). It started on 19 or 20 July. It ended on 17 or 18 August. It follows Messidor and precedes Fructidor. During Year 2, it was sometimes called Fervidor.

Because of the Thermidorian Reaction—9 Thermidor Year II—the overthrow of revolutionary radical Maximilien Robespierre and his followers in that month, the word "Thermidor" has come to signify a retreat from more radical goals and strategies during a revolution, especially when caused by a replacement of leading personalities.

Year: 3
Month: Thermidor
Year: III

Day of the 10-day
week (décade)
Primidi
Duodi
Tridi
Quartidi
Quintidi
Sextidi
Septidi
Octidi
Nonidi
Décadi

décade 31
1	Sunday; 19 July 1795
2	Monday; 20 July 1795
3	Tuesday; 21 July 1795
4	Wednesday; 22 July 1795
5	Thursday; 23 July 1795
6	Friday; 24 July 1795
7	Saturday; 25 July 1795
8	Sunday; 26 July 1795
9	Monday; 27 July 1795
10	Tuesday; 28 July 1795

décade 32
11	Wednesday; 29 July 1795
12	Thursday; 30 July 1795
13	Friday; 31 July 1795
14	Saturday; 1 August 1795
15	Sunday; 2 August 1795
16	Monday; 3 August 1795
17	Tuesday; 4 August 1795
18	Wednesday; 5 August 1795
19	Thursday; 6 August 1795
20	Friday; 7 August 1795

décade 33
21	Saturday; 8 August 1795
22	Sunday; 9 August 1795
23	Monday; 10 August 1795
24	Tuesday; 11 August 1795
25	Wednesday; 12 August 1795
26	Thursday; 13 August 1795
27	Friday; 14 August 1795
28	Saturday; 15 August 1795
29	Sunday; 16 August 1795
30	Monday; 17 August 1795

Decimal time – 10 h/day
Paris
2h78m57s

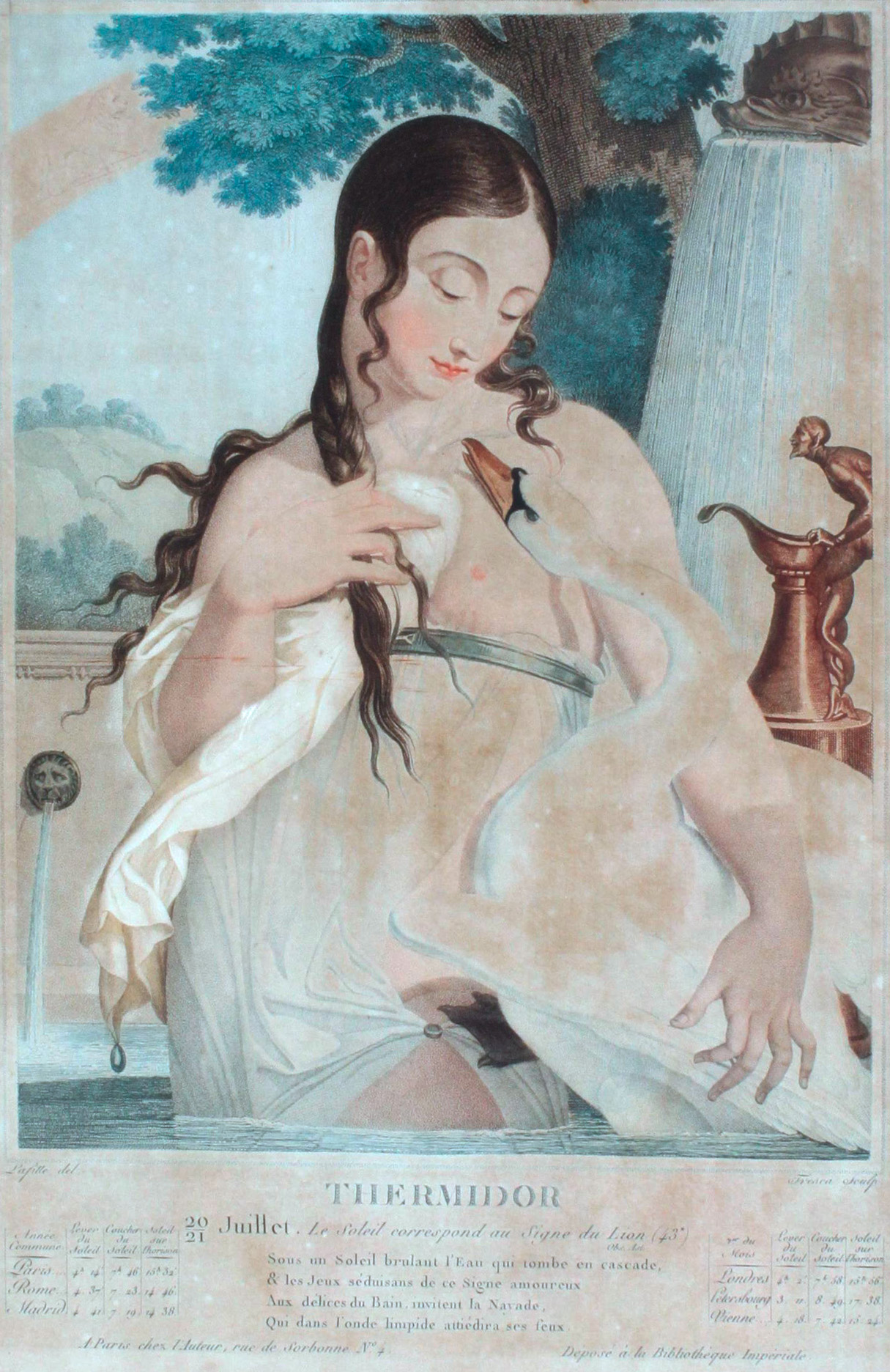
Thermidor

06:31:48
Time of day - 24 h/day
Greenwich

Conversion between Republican and Gregorian calendar for the years I - XIV

Year: 1
Month: Thermidor
Year: I

Day of the 10-day
week (décade)
Primidi
Duodi
Tridi
Quartidi
Quintidi
Sextidi
Septidi
Octidi
Nonidi
Décadi

décade 31
1	Friday; 19 July 1793
2	Saturday; 20 July 1793
3	Sunday; 21 July 1793
4	Monday; 22 July 1793
5	Tuesday; 23 July 1793
6	Wednesday; 24 July 1793
7	Thursday; 25 July 1793
8	Friday; 26 July 1793
9	Saturday; 27 July 1793
10	Sunday; 28 July 1793

décade 32
11	Monday; 29 July 1793
12	Tuesday; 30 July 1793
13	Wednesday; 31 July 1793
14	Thursday; 1 August 1793
15	Friday; 2 August 1793
16	Saturday; 3 August 1793
17	Sunday; 4 August 1793
18	Monday; 5 August 1793
19	Tuesday; 6 August 1793
20	Wednesday; 7 August 1793

décade 33
21	Thursday; 8 August 1793
22	Friday; 9 August 1793
23	Saturday; 10 August 1793
24	Sunday; 11 August 1793
25	Monday; 12 August 1793
26	Tuesday; 13 August 1793
27	Wednesday; 14 August 1793
28	Thursday; 15 August 1793
29	Friday; 16 August 1793
30	Saturday; 17 August 1793

Decimal time – 10 h/day
Paris
2:72:08

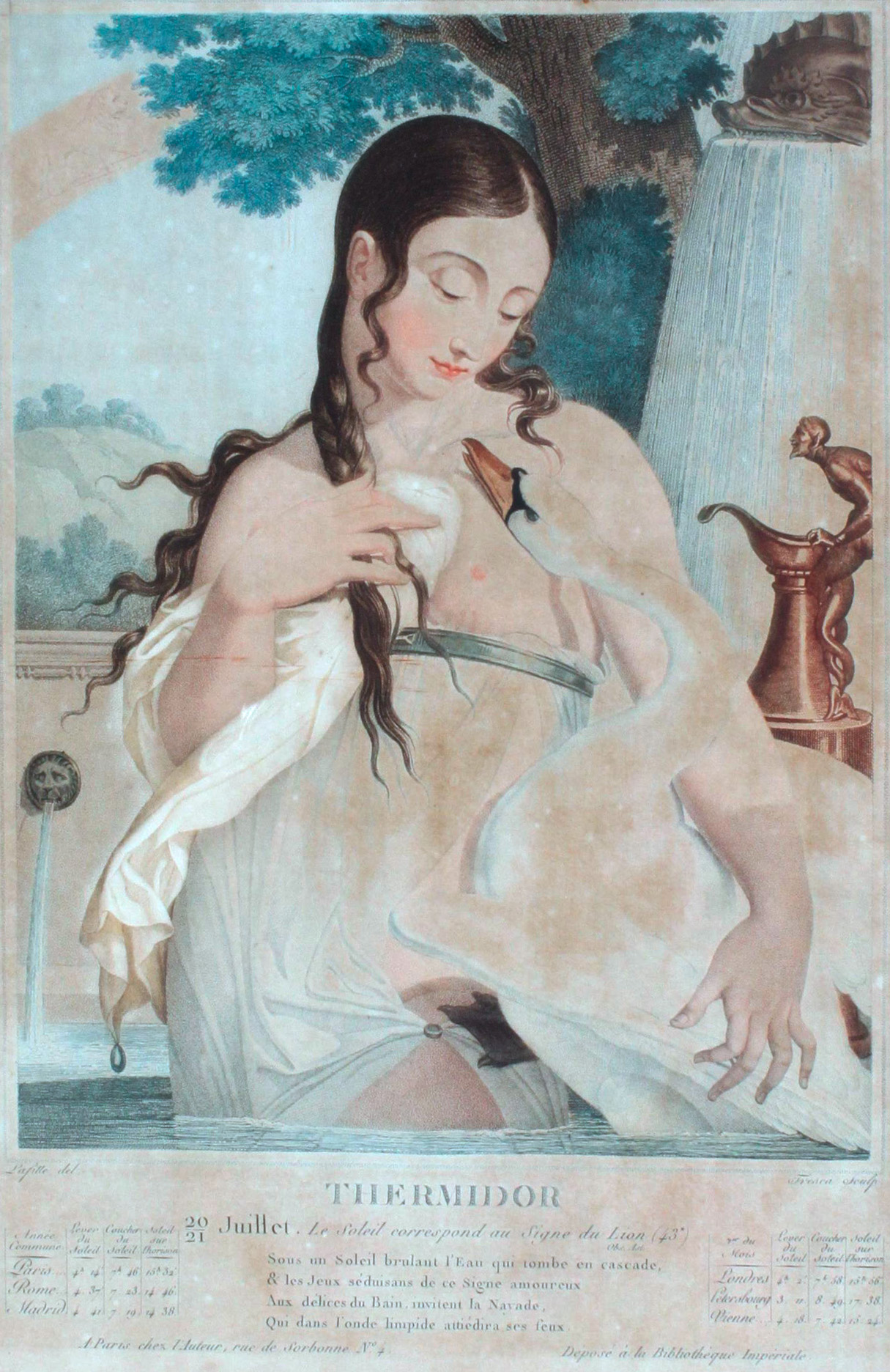
Thermidor

06:31:48
Time of day - 24 h/day
Greenwich

Year: 2
Month: Thermidor
Year: II

Day of the 10-day
week (décade)
Primidi
Duodi
Tridi
Quartidi
Quintidi
Sextidi
Septidi
Octidi
Nonidi
Décadi

décade 31
1	Saturday; 19 July 1794
2	Sunday; 20 July 1794
3	Monday; 21 July 1794
4	Tuesday; 22 July 1794
5	Wednesday; 23 July 1794
6	Thursday; 24 July 1794
7	Friday; 25 July 1794
8	Saturday; 26 July 1794
9	Sunday; 27 July 1794
10	Monday; 28 July 1794

décade 32
11	Tuesday; 29 July 1794
12	Wednesday; 30 July 1794
13	Thursday; 31 July 1794
14	Friday; 1 August 1794
15	Saturday; 2 August 1794
16	Sunday; 3 August 1794
17	Monday; 4 August 1794
18	Tuesday; 5 August 1794
19	Wednesday; 6 August 1794
20	Thursday; 7 August 1794

décade 33
21	Friday; 8 August 1794
22	Saturday; 9 August 1794
23	Sunday; 10 August 1794
24	Monday; 11 August 1794
25	Tuesday; 12 August 1794
26	Wednesday; 13 August 1794
27	Thursday; 14 August 1794
28	Friday; 15 August 1794
29	Saturday; 16 August 1794
30	Sunday; 17 August 1794

Decimal time – 10 h/day
Paris
2:72:08

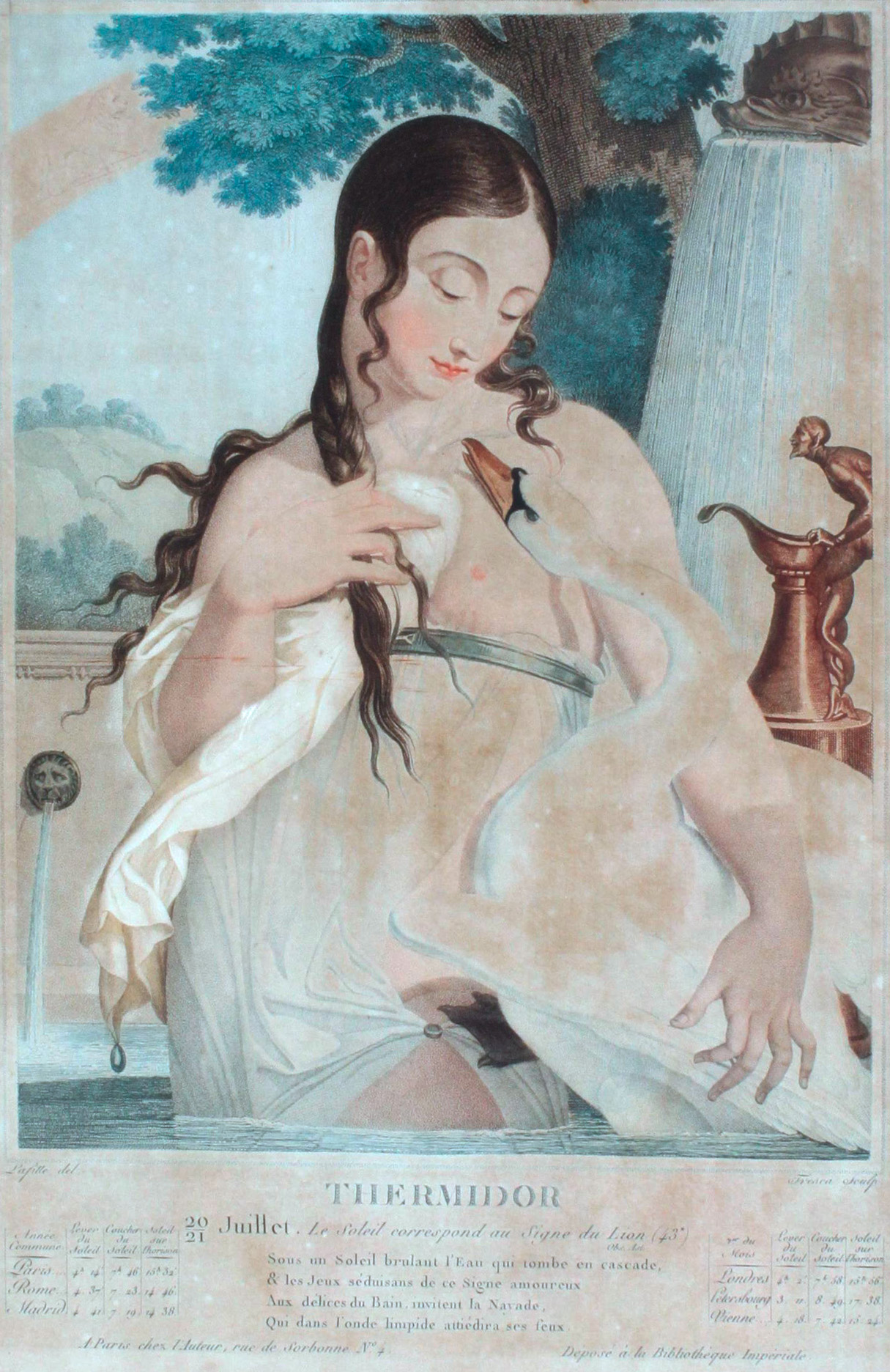
Thermidor

06:31:48
Time of day - 24 h/day
Greenwich

Year: 3
Month: Thermidor
Year: III

Day of the 10-day
week (décade)
Primidi
Duodi
Tridi
Quartidi
Quintidi
Sextidi
Septidi
Octidi
Nonidi
Décadi

décade 31
1	Sunday; 19 July 1795
2	Monday; 20 July 1795
3	Tuesday; 21 July 1795
4	Wednesday; 22 July 1795
5	Thursday; 23 July 1795
6	Friday; 24 July 1795
7	Saturday; 25 July 1795
8	Sunday; 26 July 1795
9	Monday; 27 July 1795
10	Tuesday; 28 July 1795

décade 32
11	Wednesday; 29 July 1795
12	Thursday; 30 July 1795
13	Friday; 31 July 1795
14	Saturday; 1 August 1795
15	Sunday; 2 August 1795
16	Monday; 3 August 1795
17	Tuesday; 4 August 1795
18	Wednesday; 5 August 1795
19	Thursday; 6 August 1795
20	Friday; 7 August 1795

décade 33
21	Saturday; 8 August 1795
22	Sunday; 9 August 1795
23	Monday; 10 August 1795
24	Tuesday; 11 August 1795
25	Wednesday; 12 August 1795
26	Thursday; 13 August 1795
27	Friday; 14 August 1795
28	Saturday; 15 August 1795
29	Sunday; 16 August 1795
30	Monday; 17 August 1795

Decimal time – 10 h/day
Paris
2:72:08

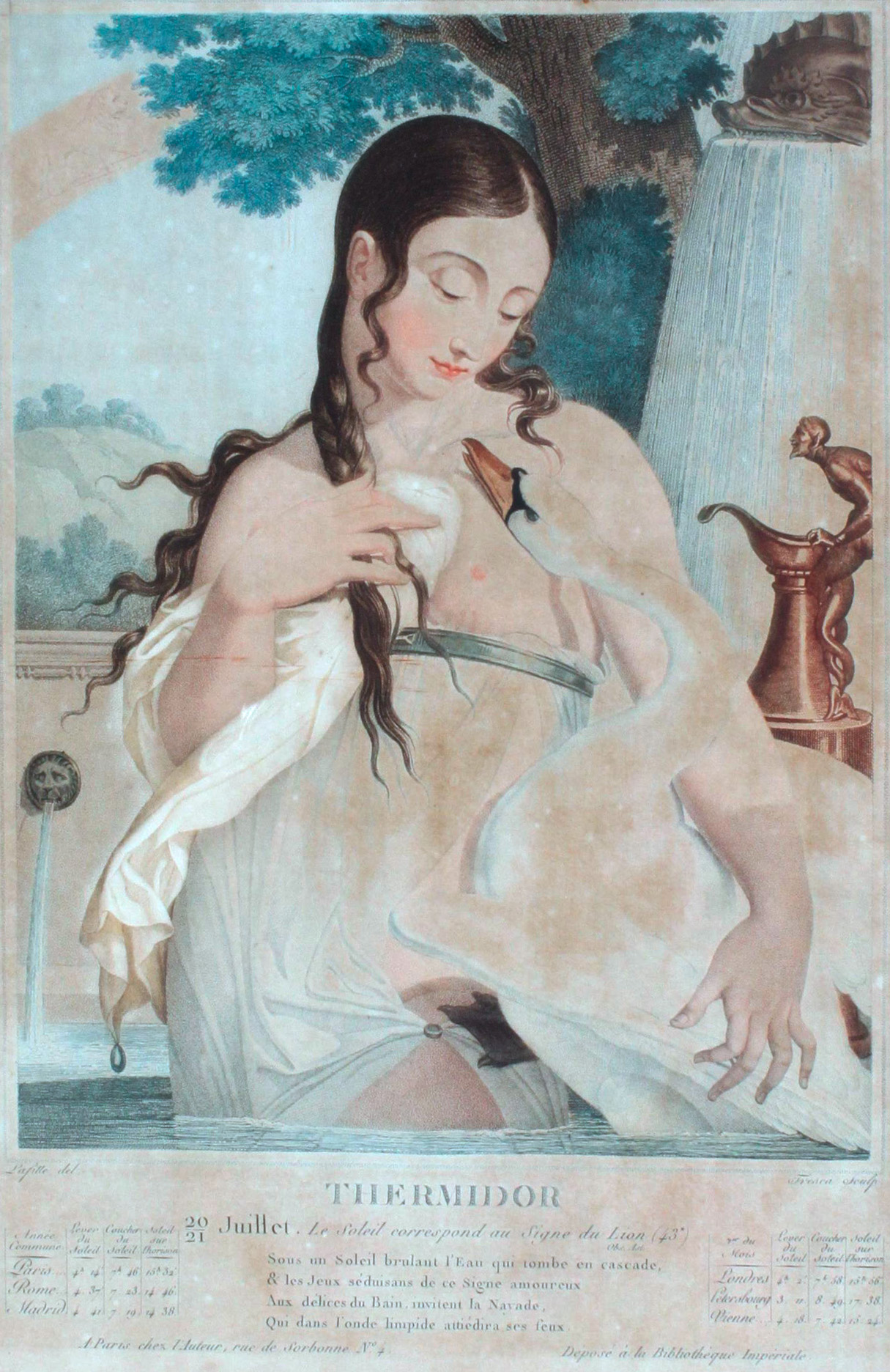
Thermidor

06:31:48
Time of day - 24 h/day
Greenwich

Year: 4
Month: Thermidor
Year: IV

Day of the 10-day
week (décade)
Primidi
Duodi
Tridi
Quartidi
Quintidi
Sextidi
Septidi
Octidi
Nonidi
Décadi

décade 31
1	Tuesday; 19 July 1796
2	Wednesday; 20 July 1796
3	Thursday; 21 July 1796
4	Friday; 22 July 1796
5	Saturday; 23 July 1796
6	Sunday; 24 July 1796
7	Monday; 25 July 1796
8	Tuesday; 26 July 1796
9	Wednesday; 27 July 1796
10	Thursday; 28 July 1796

décade 32
11	Friday; 29 July 1796
12	Saturday; 30 July 1796
13	Sunday; 31 July 1796
14	Monday; 1 August 1796
15	Tuesday; 2 August 1796
16	Wednesday; 3 August 1796
17	Thursday; 4 August 1796
18	Friday; 5 August 1796
19	Saturday; 6 August 1796
20	Sunday; 7 August 1796

décade 33
21	Monday; 8 August 1796
22	Tuesday; 9 August 1796
23	Wednesday; 10 August 1796
24	Thursday; 11 August 1796
25	Friday; 12 August 1796
26	Saturday; 13 August 1796
27	Sunday; 14 August 1796
28	Monday; 15 August 1796
29	Tuesday; 16 August 1796
30	Wednesday; 17 August 1796

Decimal time – 10 h/day
Paris
2:72:08

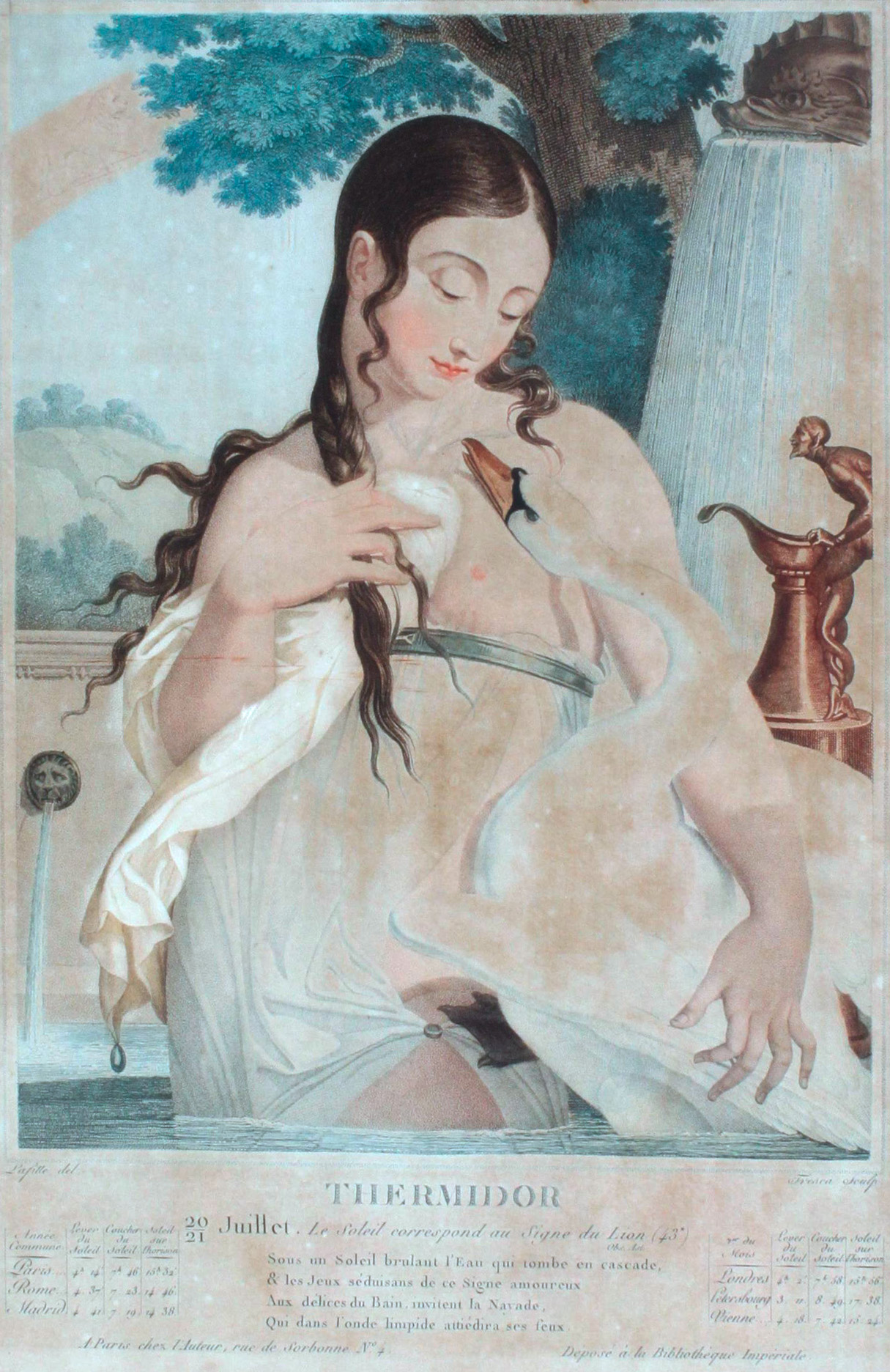
Thermidor

06:31:48
Time of day - 24 h/day
Greenwich

Year: 5
Month: Thermidor
Year: V

Day of the 10-day
week (décade)
Primidi
Duodi
Tridi
Quartidi
Quintidi
Sextidi
Septidi
Octidi
Nonidi
Décadi

décade 31
1	Wednesday; 19 July 1797
2	Thursday; 20 July 1797
3	Friday; 21 July 1797
4	Saturday; 22 July 1797
5	Sunday; 23 July 1797
6	Monday; 24 July 1797
7	Tuesday; 25 July 1797
8	Wednesday; 26 July 1797
9	Thursday; 27 July 1797
10	Friday; 28 July 1797

décade 32
11	Saturday; 29 July 1797
12	Sunday; 30 July 1797
13	Monday; 31 July 1797
14	Tuesday; 1 August 1797
15	Wednesday; 2 August 1797
16	Thursday; 3 August 1797
17	Friday; 4 August 1797
18	Saturday; 5 August 1797
19	Sunday; 6 August 1797
20	Monday; 7 August 1797

décade 33
21	Tuesday; 8 August 1797
22	Wednesday; 9 August 1797
23	Thursday; 10 August 1797
24	Friday; 11 August 1797
25	Saturday; 12 August 1797
26	Sunday; 13 August 1797
27	Monday; 14 August 1797
28	Tuesday; 15 August 1797
29	Wednesday; 16 August 1797
30	Thursday; 17 August 1797

Decimal time – 10 h/day
Paris
2:72:08

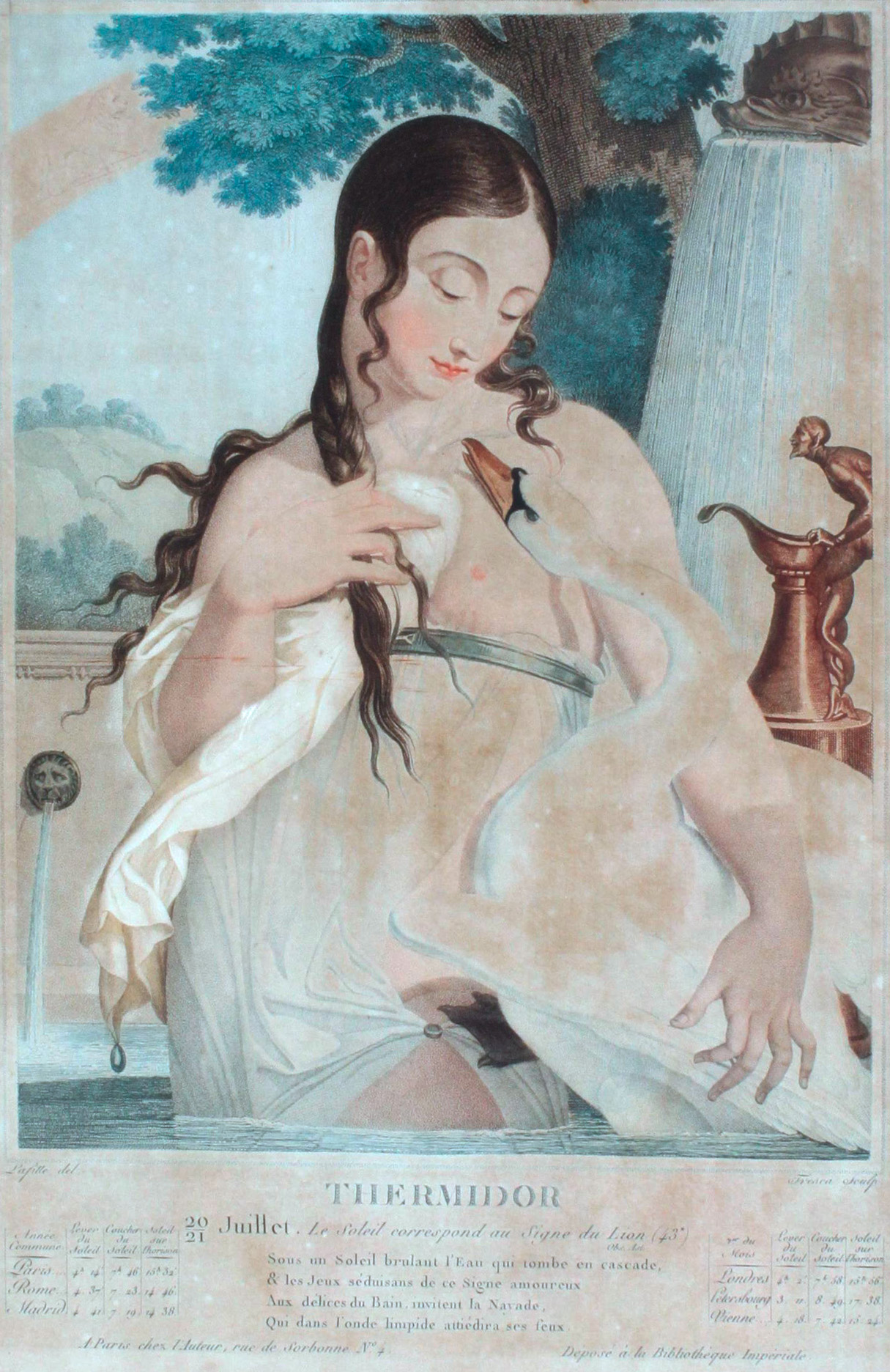
Thermidor

06:31:48
Time of day - 24 h/day
Greenwich

Year: 6
Month: Thermidor
Year: VI

Day of the 10-day
week (décade)
Primidi
Duodi
Tridi
Quartidi
Quintidi
Sextidi
Septidi
Octidi
Nonidi
Décadi

décade 31
1	Thursday; 19 July 1798
2	Friday; 20 July 1798
3	Saturday; 21 July 1798
4	Sunday; 22 July 1798
5	Monday; 23 July 1798
6	Tuesday; 24 July 1798
7	Wednesday; 25 July 1798
8	Thursday; 26 July 1798
9	Friday; 27 July 1798
10	Saturday; 28 July 1798

décade 32
11	Sunday; 29 July 1798
12	Monday; 30 July 1798
13	Tuesday; 31 July 1798
14	Wednesday; 1 August 1798
15	Thursday; 2 August 1798
16	Friday; 3 August 1798
17	Saturday; 4 August 1798
18	Sunday; 5 August 1798
19	Monday; 6 August 1798
20	Tuesday; 7 August 1798

décade 33
21	Wednesday; 8 August 1798
22	Thursday; 9 August 1798
23	Friday; 10 August 1798
24	Saturday; 11 August 1798
25	Sunday; 12 August 1798
26	Monday; 13 August 1798
27	Tuesday; 14 August 1798
28	Wednesday; 15 August 1798
29	Thursday; 16 August 1798
30	Friday; 17 August 1798

Decimal time – 10 h/day
Paris
2:72:08

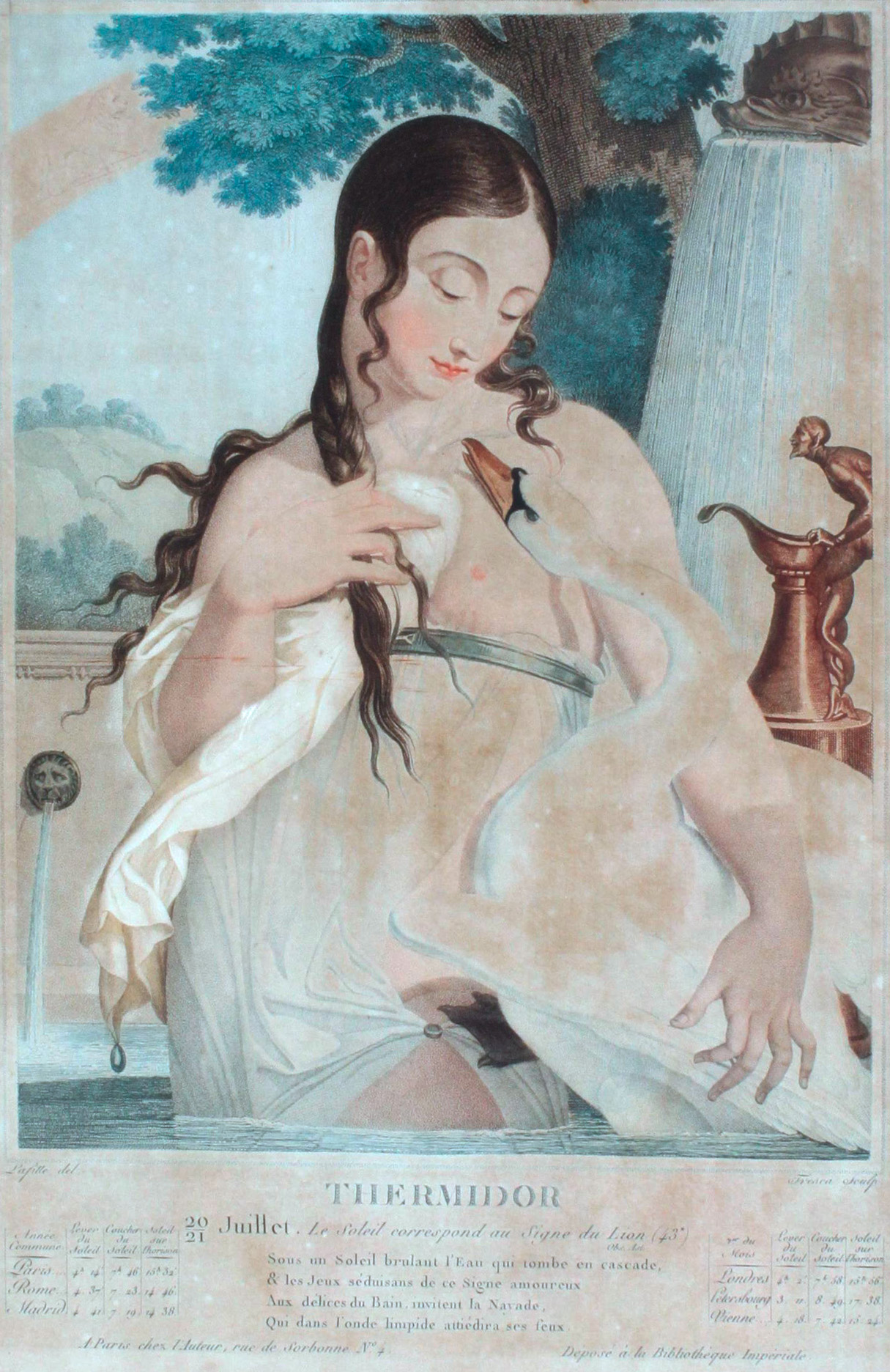
Thermidor

06:31:48
Time of day - 24 h/day
Greenwich

Year: 7
Month: Thermidor
Year: VII

Day of the 10-day
week (décade)
Primidi
Duodi
Tridi
Quartidi
Quintidi
Sextidi
Septidi
Octidi
Nonidi
Décadi

décade 31
1	Friday; 19 July 1799
2	Saturday; 20 July 1799
3	Sunday; 21 July 1799
4	Monday; 22 July 1799
5	Tuesday; 23 July 1799
6	Wednesday; 24 July 1799
7	Thursday; 25 July 1799
8	Friday; 26 July 1799
9	Saturday; 27 July 1799
10	Sunday; 28 July 1799

décade 32
11	Monday; 29 July 1799
12	Tuesday; 30 July 1799
13	Wednesday; 31 July 1799
14	Thursday; 1 August 1799
15	Friday; 2 August 1799
16	Saturday; 3 August 1799
17	Sunday; 4 August 1799
18	Monday; 5 August 1799
19	Tuesday; 6 August 1799
20	Wednesday; 7 August 1799

décade 33
21	Thursday; 8 August 1799
22	Friday; 9 August 1799
23	Saturday; 10 August 1799
24	Sunday; 11 August 1799
25	Monday; 12 August 1799
26	Tuesday; 13 August 1799
27	Wednesday; 14 August 1799
28	Thursday; 15 August 1799
29	Friday; 16 August 1799
30	Saturday; 17 August 1799

Decimal time – 10 h/day
Paris
2:72:08

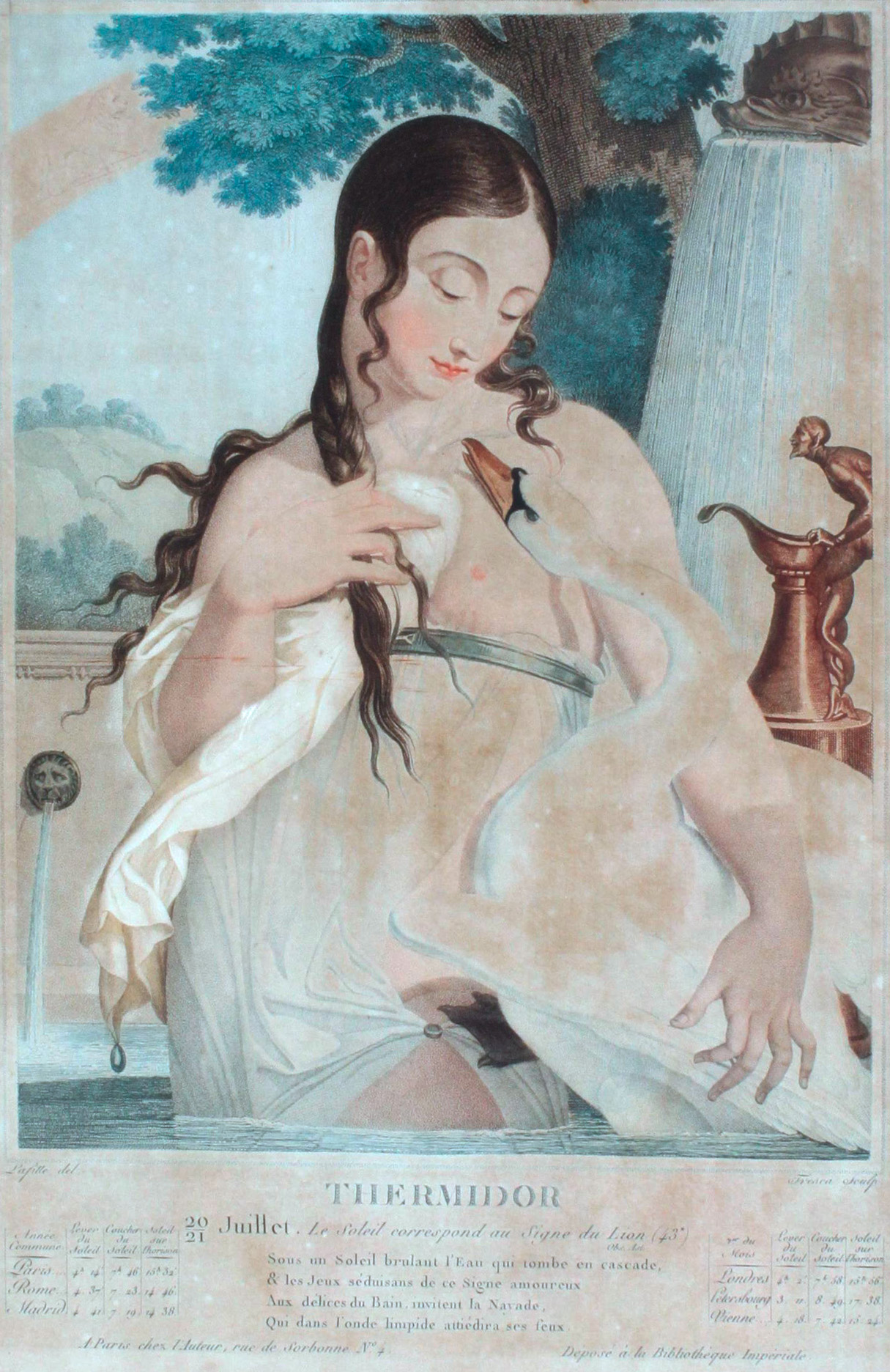
Thermidor

06:31:48
Time of day - 24 h/day
Greenwich

Year: 8
Month: Thermidor
Year: VIII

Day of the 10-day
week (décade)
Primidi
Duodi
Tridi
Quartidi
Quintidi
Sextidi
Septidi
Octidi
Nonidi
Décadi

décade 31
1	Sunday; 20 July 1800
2	Monday; 21 July 1800
3	Tuesday; 22 July 1800
4	Wednesday; 23 July 1800
5	Thursday; 24 July 1800
6	Friday; 25 July 1800
7	Saturday; 26 July 1800
8	Sunday; 27 July 1800
9	Monday; 28 July 1800
10	Tuesday; 29 July 1800

décade 32
11	Wednesday; 30 July 1800
12	Thursday; 31 July 1800
13	Friday; 1 August 1800
14	Saturday; 2 August 1800
15	Sunday; 3 August 1800
16	Monday; 4 August 1800
17	Tuesday; 5 August 1800
18	Wednesday; 6 August 1800
19	Thursday; 7 August 1800
20	Friday; 8 August 1800

décade 33
21	Saturday; 9 August 1800
22	Sunday; 10 August 1800
23	Monday; 11 August 1800
24	Tuesday; 12 August 1800
25	Wednesday; 13 August 1800
26	Thursday; 14 August 1800
27	Friday; 15 August 1800
28	Saturday; 16 August 1800
29	Sunday; 17 August 1800
30	Monday; 18 August 1800

Decimal time – 10 h/day
Paris
2:72:08

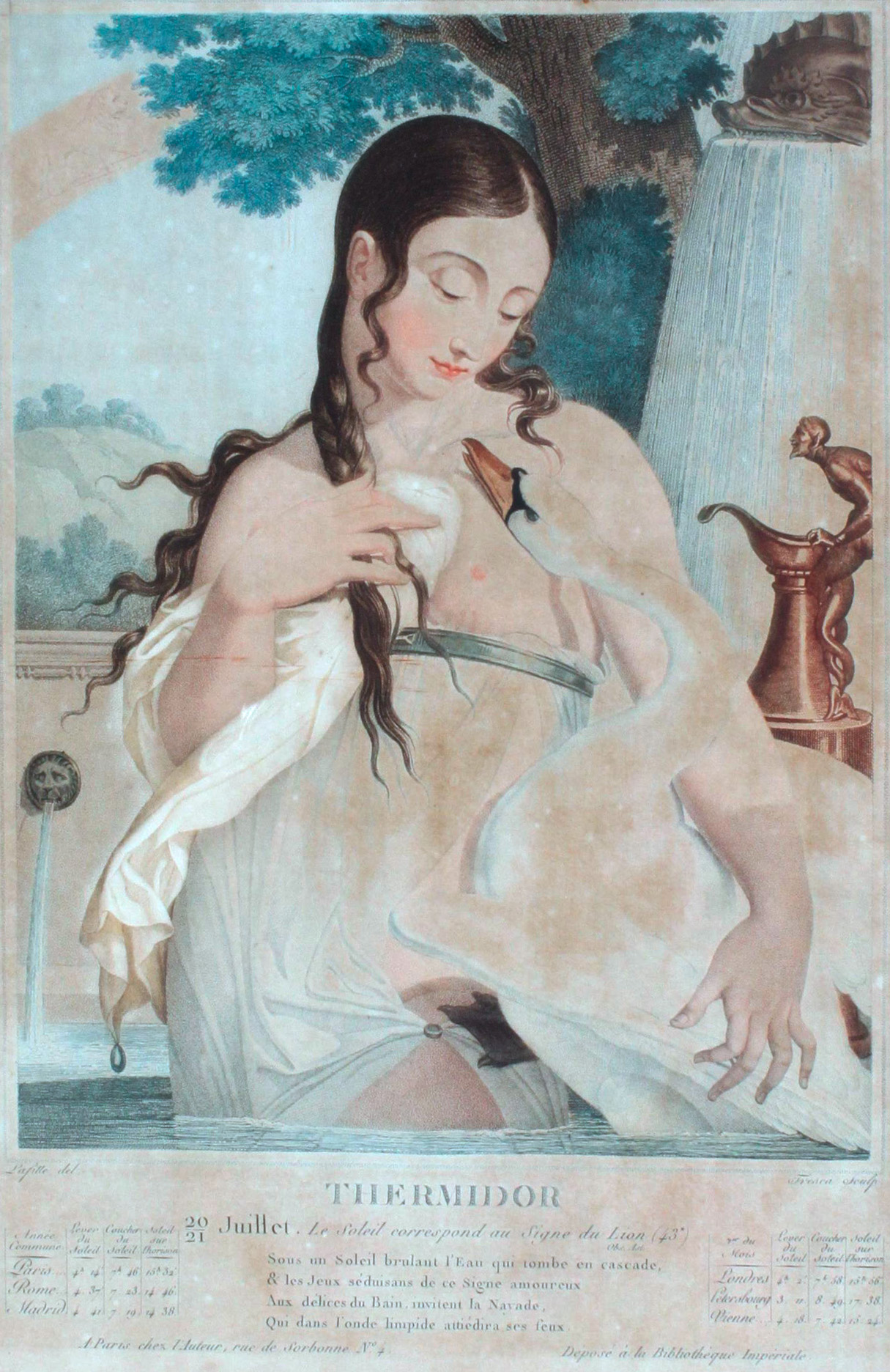
Thermidor

06:31:48
Time of day - 24 h/day
Greenwich

Year: 9
Month: Thermidor
Year: IX

Day of the 10-day
week (décade)
Primidi
Duodi
Tridi
Quartidi
Quintidi
Sextidi
Septidi
Octidi
Nonidi
Décadi

décade 31
1	Monday; 20 July 1801
2	Tuesday; 21 July 1801
3	Wednesday; 22 July 1801
4	Thursday; 23 July 1801
5	Friday; 24 July 1801
6	Saturday; 25 July 1801
7	Sunday; 26 July 1801
8	Monday; 27 July 1801
9	Tuesday; 28 July 1801
10	Wednesday; 29 July 1801

décade 32
11	Thursday; 30 July 1801
12	Friday; 31 July 1801
13	Saturday; 1 August 1801
14	Sunday; 2 August 1801
15	Monday; 3 August 1801
16	Tuesday; 4 August 1801
17	Wednesday; 5 August 1801
18	Thursday; 6 August 1801
19	Friday; 7 August 1801
20	Saturday; 8 August 1801

décade 33
21	Sunday; 9 August 1801
22	Monday; 10 August 1801
23	Tuesday; 11 August 1801
24	Wednesday; 12 August 1801
25	Thursday; 13 August 1801
26	Friday; 14 August 1801
27	Saturday; 15 August 1801
28	Sunday; 16 August 1801
29	Monday; 17 August 1801
30	Tuesday; 18 August 1801

Decimal time – 10 h/day
Paris
2:72:08

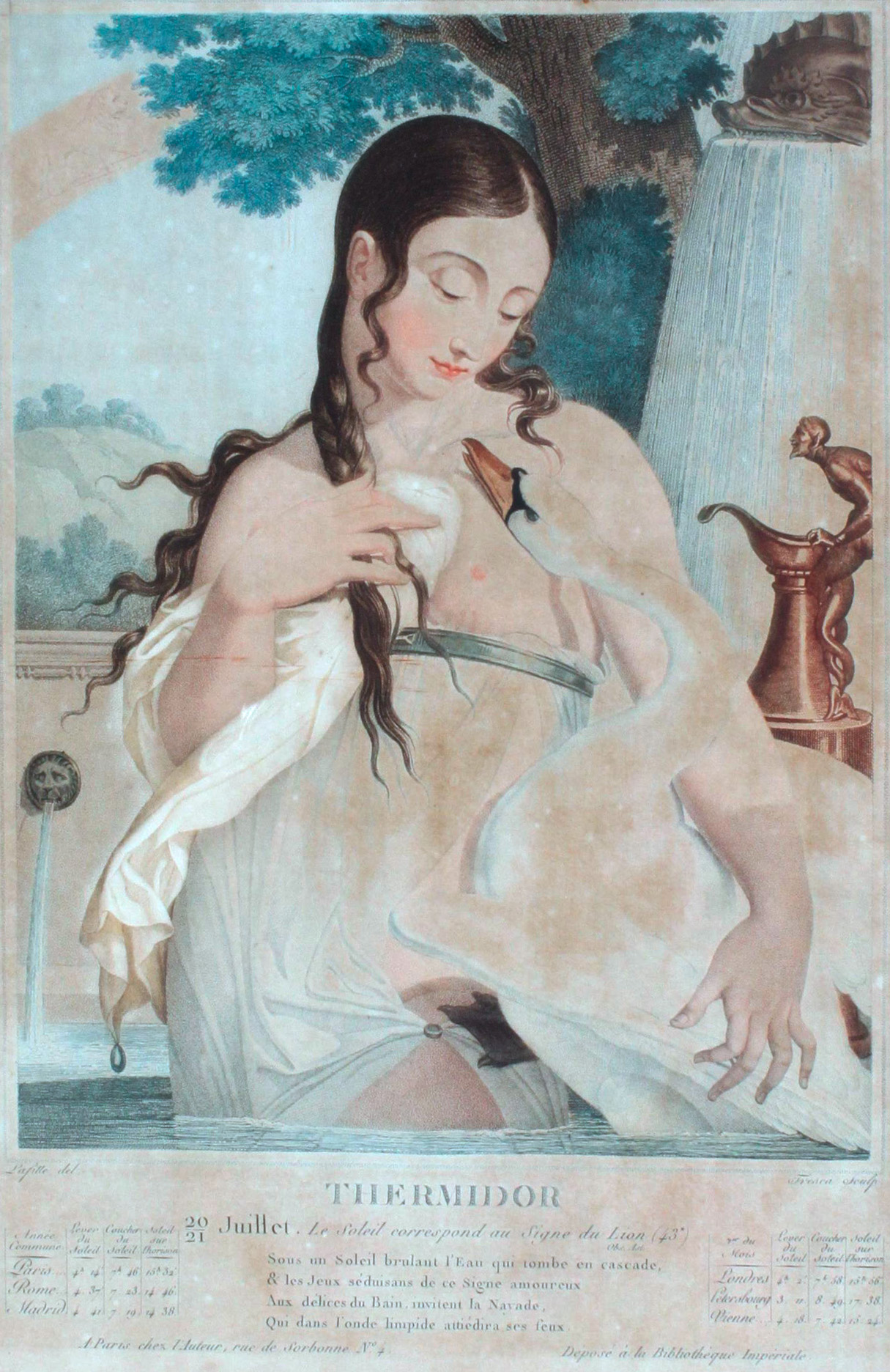
Thermidor

06:31:48
Time of day - 24 h/day
Greenwich

Year: 10
Month: Thermidor
Year: X

Day of the 10-day
week (décade)
Primidi
Duodi
Tridi
Quartidi
Quintidi
Sextidi
Septidi
Octidi
Nonidi
Décadi

décade 31
1	Tuesday; 20 July 1802
2	Wednesday; 21 July 1802
3	Thursday; 22 July 1802
4	Friday; 23 July 1802
5	Saturday; 24 July 1802
6	Sunday; 25 July 1802
7	Monday; 26 July 1802
8	Tuesday; 27 July 1802
9	Wednesday; 28 July 1802
10	Thursday; 29 July 1802

décade 32
11	Friday; 30 July 1802
12	Saturday; 31 July 1802
13	Sunday; 1 August 1802
14	Monday; 2 August 1802
15	Tuesday; 3 August 1802
16	Wednesday; 4 August 1802
17	Thursday; 5 August 1802
18	Friday; 6 August 1802
19	Saturday; 7 August 1802
20	Sunday; 8 August 1802

décade 33
21	Monday; 9 August 1802
22	Tuesday; 10 August 1802
23	Wednesday; 11 August 1802
24	Thursday; 12 August 1802
25	Friday; 13 August 1802
26	Saturday; 14 August 1802
27	Sunday; 15 August 1802
28	Monday; 16 August 1802
29	Tuesday; 17 August 1802
30	Wednesday; 18 August 1802

Decimal time – 10 h/day
Paris
2:72:08

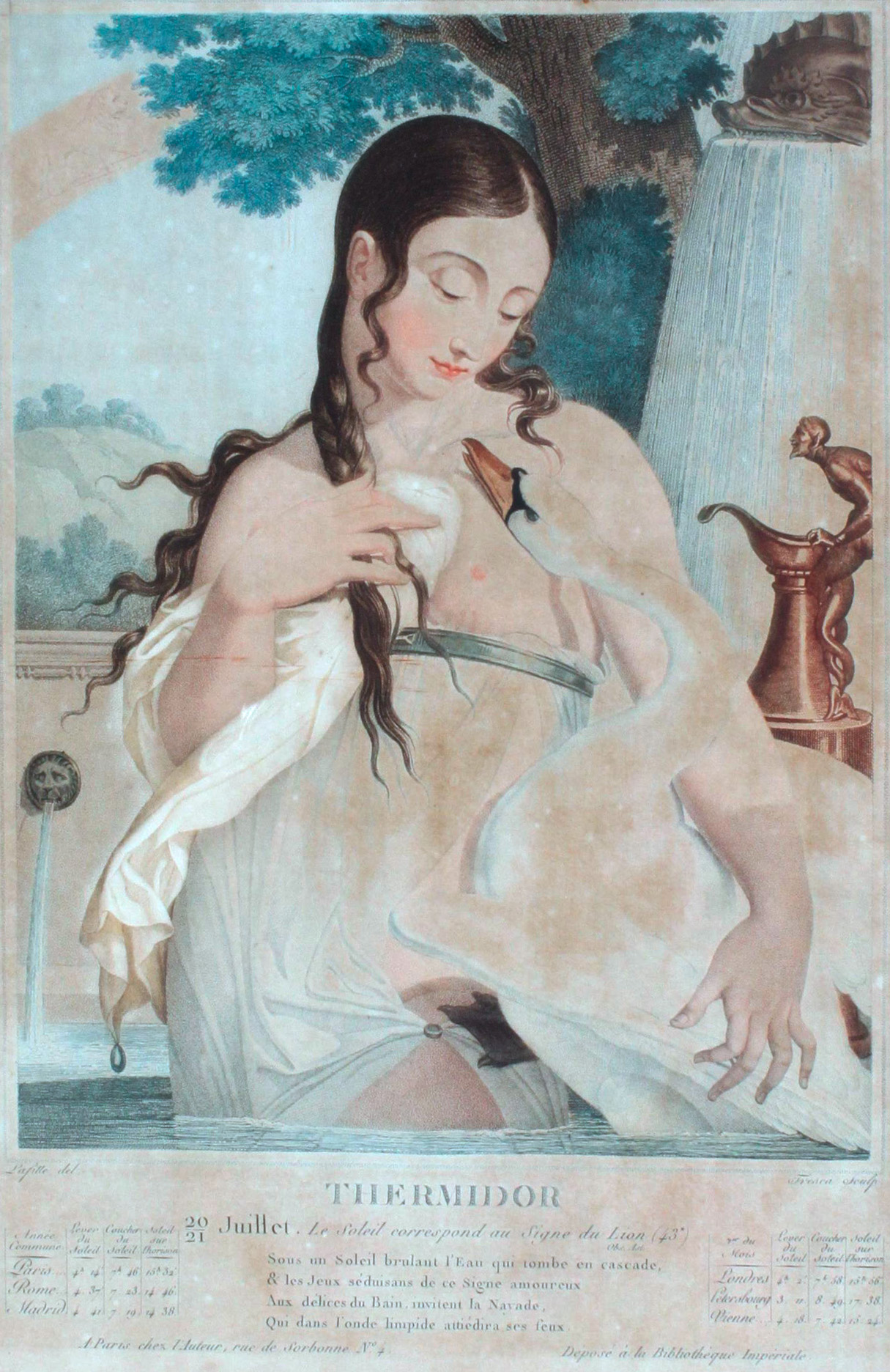
Thermidor

06:31:48
Time of day - 24 h/day
Greenwich

Year: 11
Month: Thermidor
Year: XI

Day of the 10-day
week (décade)
Primidi
Duodi
Tridi
Quartidi
Quintidi
Sextidi
Septidi
Octidi
Nonidi
Décadi

décade 31
1	Wednesday; 20 July 1803
2	Thursday; 21 July 1803
3	Friday; 22 July 1803
4	Saturday; 23 July 1803
5	Sunday; 24 July 1803
6	Monday; 25 July 1803
7	Tuesday; 26 July 1803
8	Wednesday; 27 July 1803
9	Thursday; 28 July 1803
10	Friday; 29 July 1803

décade 32
11	Saturday; 30 July 1803
12	Sunday; 31 July 1803
13	Monday; 1 August 1803
14	Tuesday; 2 August 1803
15	Wednesday; 3 August 1803
16	Thursday; 4 August 1803
17	Friday; 5 August 1803
18	Saturday; 6 August 1803
19	Sunday; 7 August 1803
20	Monday; 8 August 1803

décade 33
21	Tuesday; 9 August 1803
22	Wednesday; 10 August 1803
23	Thursday; 11 August 1803
24	Friday; 12 August 1803
25	Saturday; 13 August 1803
26	Sunday; 14 August 1803
27	Monday; 15 August 1803
28	Tuesday; 16 August 1803
29	Wednesday; 17 August 1803
30	Thursday; 18 August 1803

Decimal time – 10 h/day
Paris
2:72:08

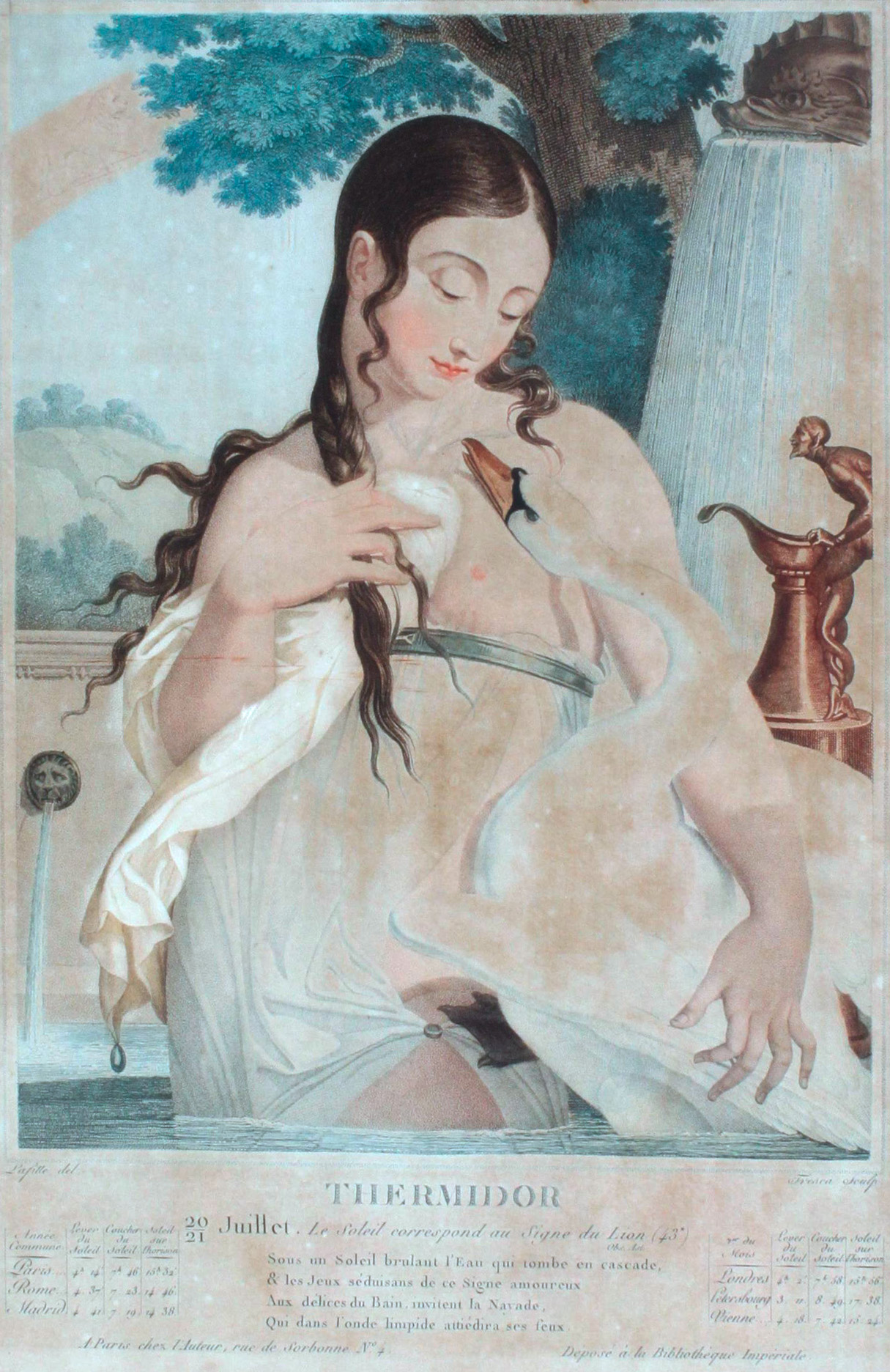
Thermidor

06:31:48
Time of day - 24 h/day
Greenwich

Year: 12
Month: Thermidor
Year: XII

Day of the 10-day
week (décade)
Primidi
Duodi
Tridi
Quartidi
Quintidi
Sextidi
Septidi
Octidi
Nonidi
Décadi

décade 31
1	Friday; 20 July 1804
2	Saturday; 21 July 1804
3	Sunday; 22 July 1804
4	Monday; 23 July 1804
5	Tuesday; 24 July 1804
6	Wednesday; 25 July 1804
7	Thursday; 26 July 1804
8	Friday; 27 July 1804
9	Saturday; 28 July 1804
10	Sunday; 29 July 1804

décade 32
11	Monday; 30 July 1804
12	Tuesday; 31 July 1804
13	Wednesday; 1 August 1804
14	Thursday; 2 August 1804
15	Friday; 3 August 1804
16	Saturday; 4 August 1804
17	Sunday; 5 August 1804
18	Monday; 6 August 1804
19	Tuesday; 7 August 1804
20	Wednesday; 8 August 1804

décade 33
21	Thursday; 9 August 1804
22	Friday; 10 August 1804
23	Saturday; 11 August 1804
24	Sunday; 12 August 1804
25	Monday; 13 August 1804
26	Tuesday; 14 August 1804
27	Wednesday; 15 August 1804
28	Thursday; 16 August 1804
29	Friday; 17 August 1804
30	Saturday; 18 August 1804

Decimal time – 10 h/day
Paris
2:72:08

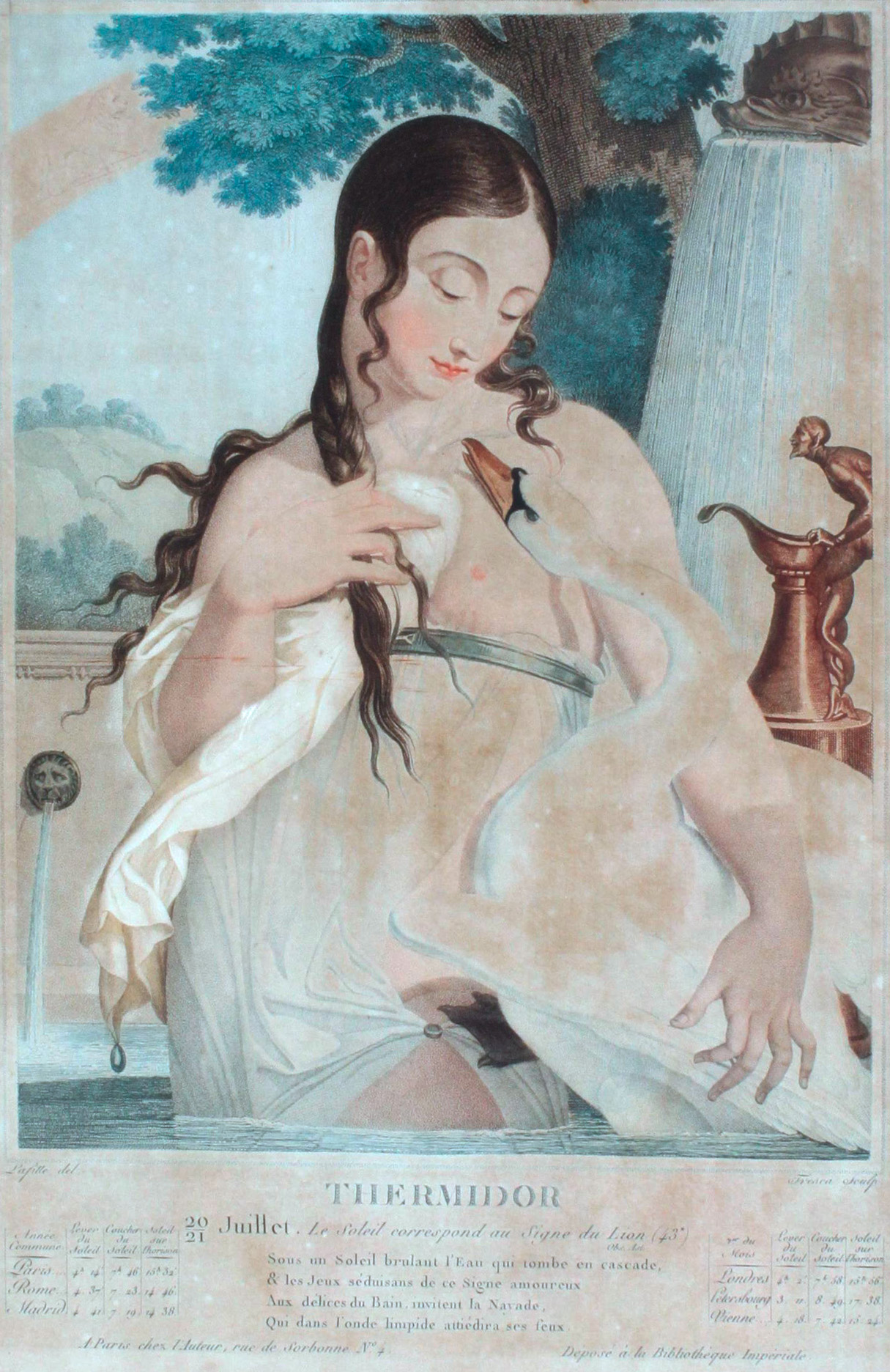
Thermidor

06:31:48
Time of day - 24 h/day
Greenwich

Year: 13
Month: Thermidor
Year: XIII

Day of the 10-day
week (décade)
Primidi
Duodi
Tridi
Quartidi
Quintidi
Sextidi
Septidi
Octidi
Nonidi
Décadi

décade 31
1	Saturday; 20 July 1805
2	Sunday; 21 July 1805
3	Monday; 22 July 1805
4	Tuesday; 23 July 1805
5	Wednesday; 24 July 1805
6	Thursday; 25 July 1805
7	Friday; 26 July 1805
8	Saturday; 27 July 1805
9	Sunday; 28 July 1805
10	Monday; 29 July 1805

décade 32
11	Tuesday; 30 July 1805
12	Wednesday; 31 July 1805
13	Thursday; 1 August 1805
14	Friday; 2 August 1805
15	Saturday; 3 August 1805
16	Sunday; 4 August 1805
17	Monday; 5 August 1805
18	Tuesday; 6 August 1805
19	Wednesday; 7 August 1805
20	Thursday; 8 August 1805

décade 33
21	Friday; 9 August 1805
22	Saturday; 10 August 1805
23	Sunday; 11 August 1805
24	Monday; 12 August 1805
25	Tuesday; 13 August 1805
26	Wednesday; 14 August 1805
27	Thursday; 15 August 1805
28	Friday; 16 August 1805
29	Saturday; 17 August 1805
30	Sunday; 18 August 1805

Decimal time – 10 h/day
Paris
2:72:08

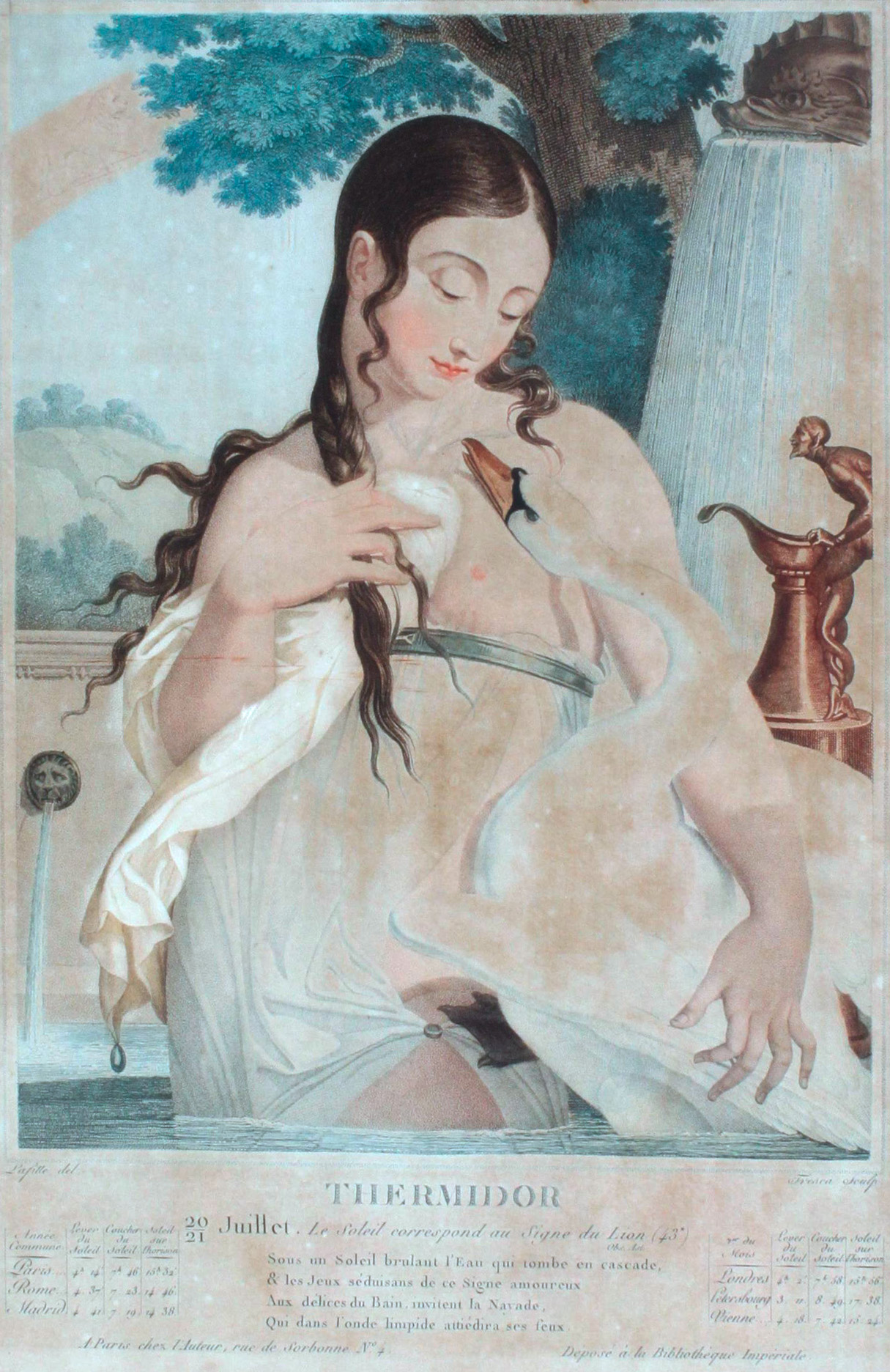
Thermidor

06:31:48
Time of day - 24 h/day
Greenwich

Year: 14
Month: Thermidor
Year: XIV

Day of the 10-day
week (décade)
Primidi
Duodi
Tridi
Quartidi
Quintidi
Sextidi
Septidi
Octidi
Nonidi
Décadi

décade 31
1	Sunday; 20 July 1806
2	Monday; 21 July 1806
3	Tuesday; 22 July 1806
4	Wednesday; 23 July 1806
5	Thursday; 24 July 1806
6	Friday; 25 July 1806
7	Saturday; 26 July 1806
8	Sunday; 27 July 1806
9	Monday; 28 July 1806
10	Tuesday; 29 July 1806

décade 32
11	Wednesday; 30 July 1806
12	Thursday; 31 July 1806
13	Friday; 1 August 1806
14	Saturday; 2 August 1806
15	Sunday; 3 August 1806
16	Monday; 4 August 1806
17	Tuesday; 5 August 1806
18	Wednesday; 6 August 1806
19	Thursday; 7 August 1806
20	Friday; 8 August 1806

décade 33
21	Saturday; 9 August 1806
22	Sunday; 10 August 1806
23	Monday; 11 August 1806
24	Tuesday; 12 August 1806
25	Wednesday; 13 August 1806
26	Thursday; 14 August 1806
27	Friday; 15 August 1806
28	Saturday; 16 August 1806
29	Sunday; 17 August 1806
30	Monday; 18 August 1806

Decimal time – 10 h/day
Paris
2:72:08

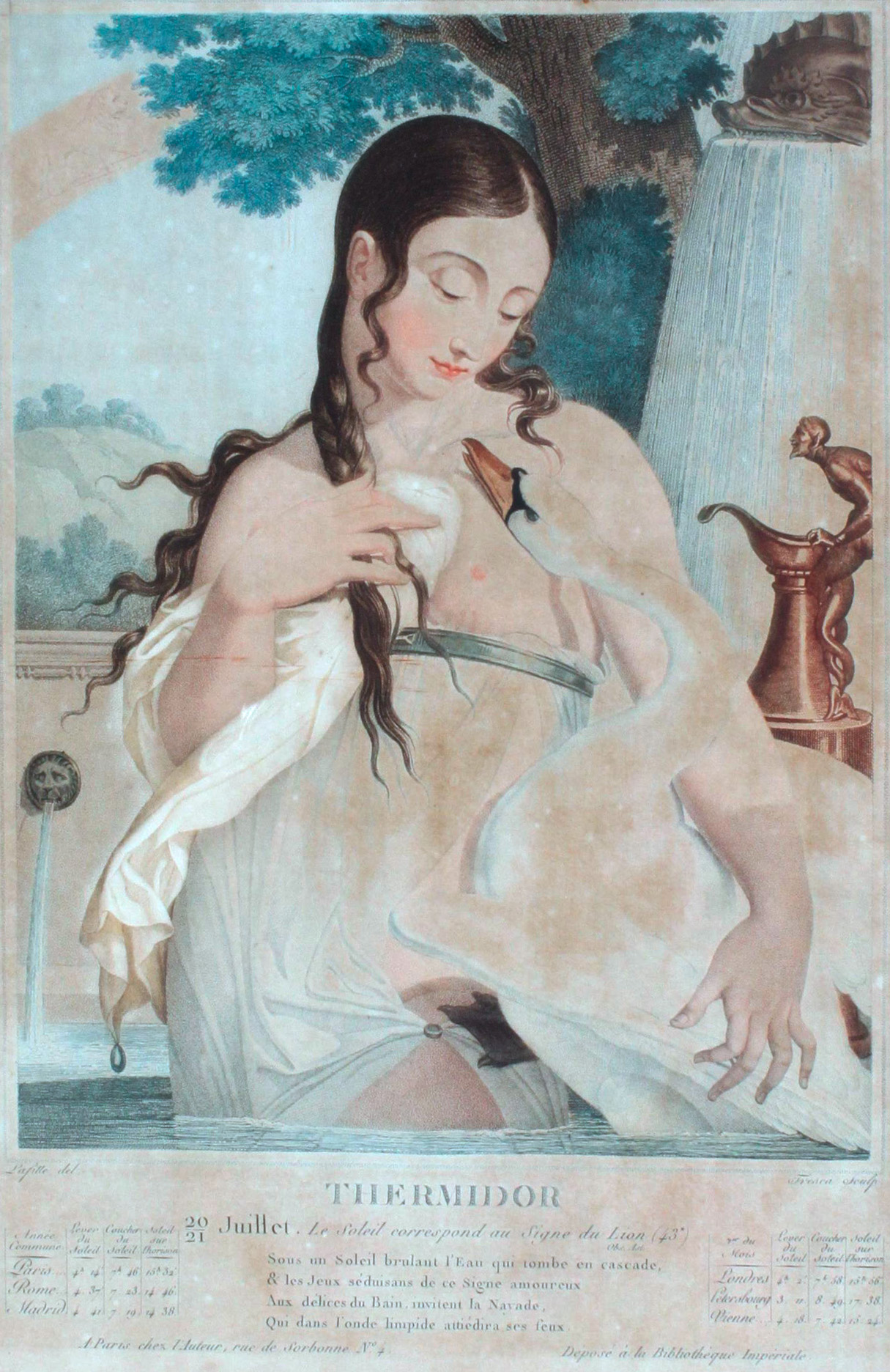
Thermidor

06:31:48
Time of day - 24 h/day
Greenwich

== Day name table ==
Like all French Republican Calendar months, Thermidor lasted 30 days and was divided into three 10-day weeks called décades (decades). Every day had the name of an agricultural plant, except the 5th (Quintidi) and 10th day (Decadi) of every decade, which had the name of a domestic animal or an agricultural tool, respectively.

	1^{re} Décade		2^{e} Décade		3^{e} Décade	
Primidi	1.	Epeautre (Spelt)	11.	Panic (Eryngo)	21.	Carline (Silver Thistle)
Duodi	2.	Bouillon blanc (Mullein)	12.	Salicor (Glasswort)	22.	Caprier (Caper)
Tridi	3.	Melon (Melon)	13.	Abricot (Apricot)	23.	Lentille (Lentil)
Quartidi	4.	Ivraie (Ryegrass)	14.	Basilic (Basil)	24.	Aunée (Elecampane)
Quintidi	5.	Bélier (Ram)	15.	Brebis (Ewe)	25.	Loutre (Otter)
Sextidi	6.	Prêle (Horsetail)	16.	Guimauve (Marsh Mallow)	26.	Myrthe (Myrtle)
Septidi	7.	Armoise (Mugwort)	17.	Lin (Flax)	27.	Colza (Rapeseed)
Octidi	8.	Carthame (Safflower)	18.	Amande (Almond)	28.	Lupin (Lupin)
Nonidi	9.	Mûre (Blackberry)	19.	Genthiane (Gentian)	29.	Coton (Cotton)
Decadi	10.	Arrosoir (Watering Can)	20.	Écluse (Lock)	30.	Moulin (Mill)

== Conversion table ==
Table for conversion between Republican and Gregorian Calendar
for the month "Thermidor"

I. / II. / III. / IV. / V. / VI. / VII.
1	2	3	4	5	6	7	8	9	10	11	12	13	14	15	16	17	18	19	20	21	22	23	24	25	26	27	28	29	30
19	20	21	22	23	24	25	26	27	28	29	30	31	1	2	3	4	5	6	7	8	9	10	11	12	13	14	15	16	17
July / 1793 / 1794 / 1795 / 1796 / 1797 / 1798 / 1799 / August

VIII. / IX. / X. / XI. / XII. / XIII.
1	2	3	4	5	6	7	8	9	10	11	12	13	14	15	16	17	18	19	20	21	22	23	24	25	26	27	28	29	30
20	21	22	23	24	25	26	27	28	29	30	31	1	2	3	4	5	6	7	8	9	10	11	12	13	14	15	16	17	18
July / 1800 / 1801 / 1802 / 1803 / 1804 / 1805 / August

== Thermidor in revolution ==
The Thermidorian Reaction, Revolution of Thermidor, or simply Thermidor refers to the coup of 9 Thermidor (27 July 1794) in which the Committee of Public Safety led by Maximilien Robespierre was sidelined and its leaders arrested and guillotined, resulting in the end of the Reign of Terror. The new regime, known as The Directory, introduced more conservative policies aimed at stabilizing the revolutionary government.

Consequently, for historians of revolutionary movements, the term Thermidor has come to mean the phase in some revolutions when the political pendulum swings back towards something resembling a pre-revolutionary state, and power slips from the hands of the original revolutionary leadership. Leon Trotsky, in his book The Revolution Betrayed, refers to the rise of Joseph Stalin and the accompanying post-revolutionary bureaucracy as the "Soviet Thermidor".

== Thermidor in culture ==
The food Lobster Thermidor was named, directly or indirectly, after the month. Sometimes it is said that it was first prepared for Napoleon I during the month of Thermidor. Others say that it was created by Tony Girod at the Café de Paris, to celebrate the opening of a play called Thermidor.

Thermidor is the name of a story revolving around the end of the French Revolution in Neil Gaiman's The Sandman, issue #29.

There is a song recorded by J-pop artist Nana Mizuki by the name of "Thermidor". Its lyrics talk about a person in love that is also rethinking their personal feelings after realizing that the person they love has changed, and so has the person. Its lyrics mimic the modern definition of Thermidor.
