= Granges-sur-Aube =

- Commune
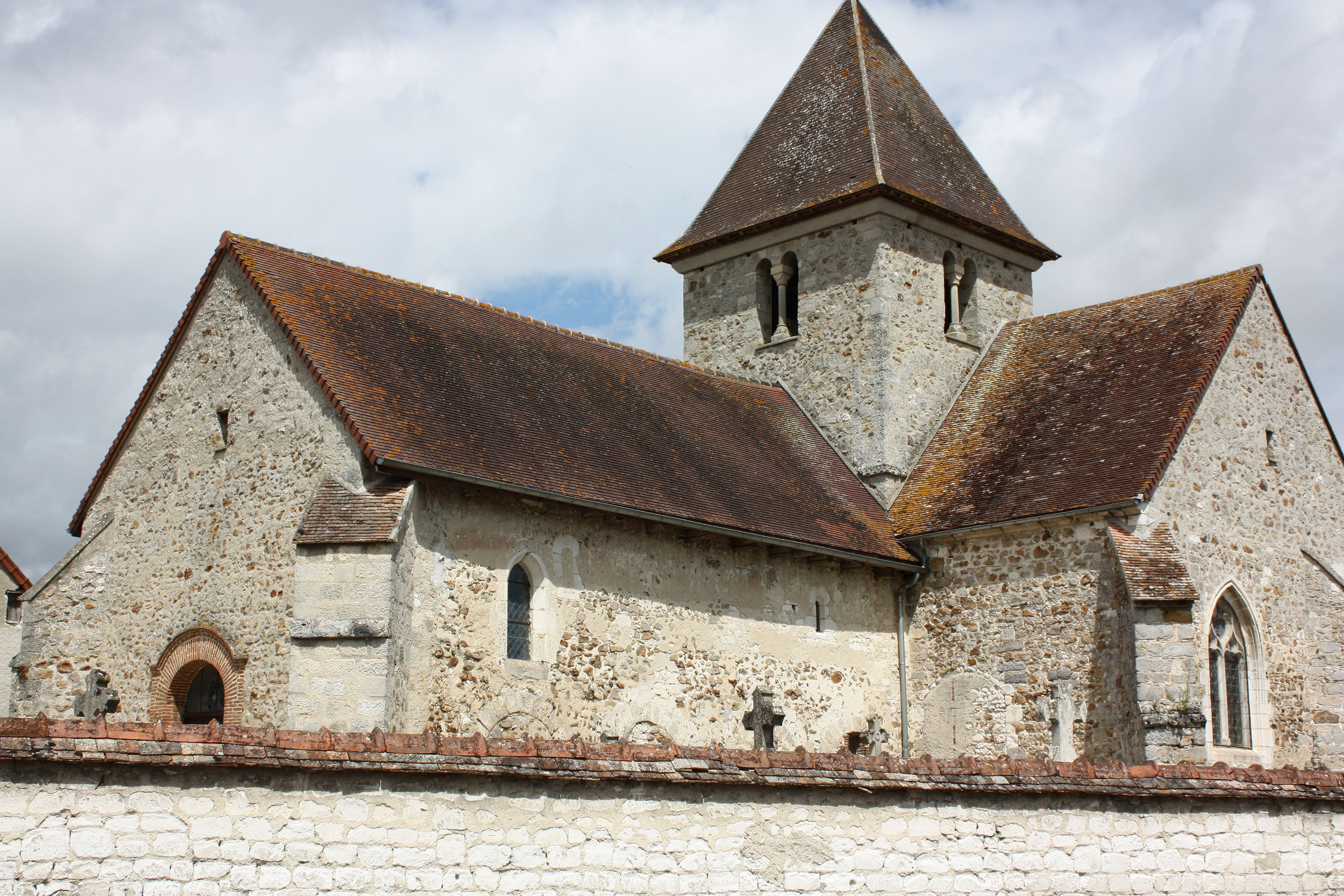
- The church in Granges-sur-Aube
- Location of Granges-sur-Aube
- Location within France Location within Grand Est
- Coordinates: 48°34′57″N 3°51′12″E
- Country: France
- Region: Grand Est
- Department: Marne
- Arrondissement: Épernay
- Canton: Vertus-Plaine Champenoise
- Intercommunality: Sézanne-Sud Ouest Marnais

Government
  - Mayor (2020–2026): Angélique Brier
- Area^{1}: 8.06 km^{2} (3.11 sq mi)
- Elevation: 79 m (259 ft)
- Population (2023): 180
  - Density: 22/km^{2} (58/sq mi)
- Time zone: UTC+01:00 (CET)
  - Summer (DST): UTC+02:00 (CEST)
- INSEE/Postal code: 51279 /51260
- ^{1} French Land Register data, which excludes lakes, ponds, glaciers > 1 km^{2} (0.386 sq mi or 247 acres) and river estuaries.

Granges-sur-Aube (French pronunciation: [ɡʁɑ̃ʒ syʁ ob], literally Granges on Aube) is a commune in the Marne department in north-eastern France.

== See also ==
- Communes of the Marne department
