= Thermidor (play) =

Play by Victorien Sardou

Thermidor is a four-act dramatic play by the 19th-century French playwright Victorien Sardou.

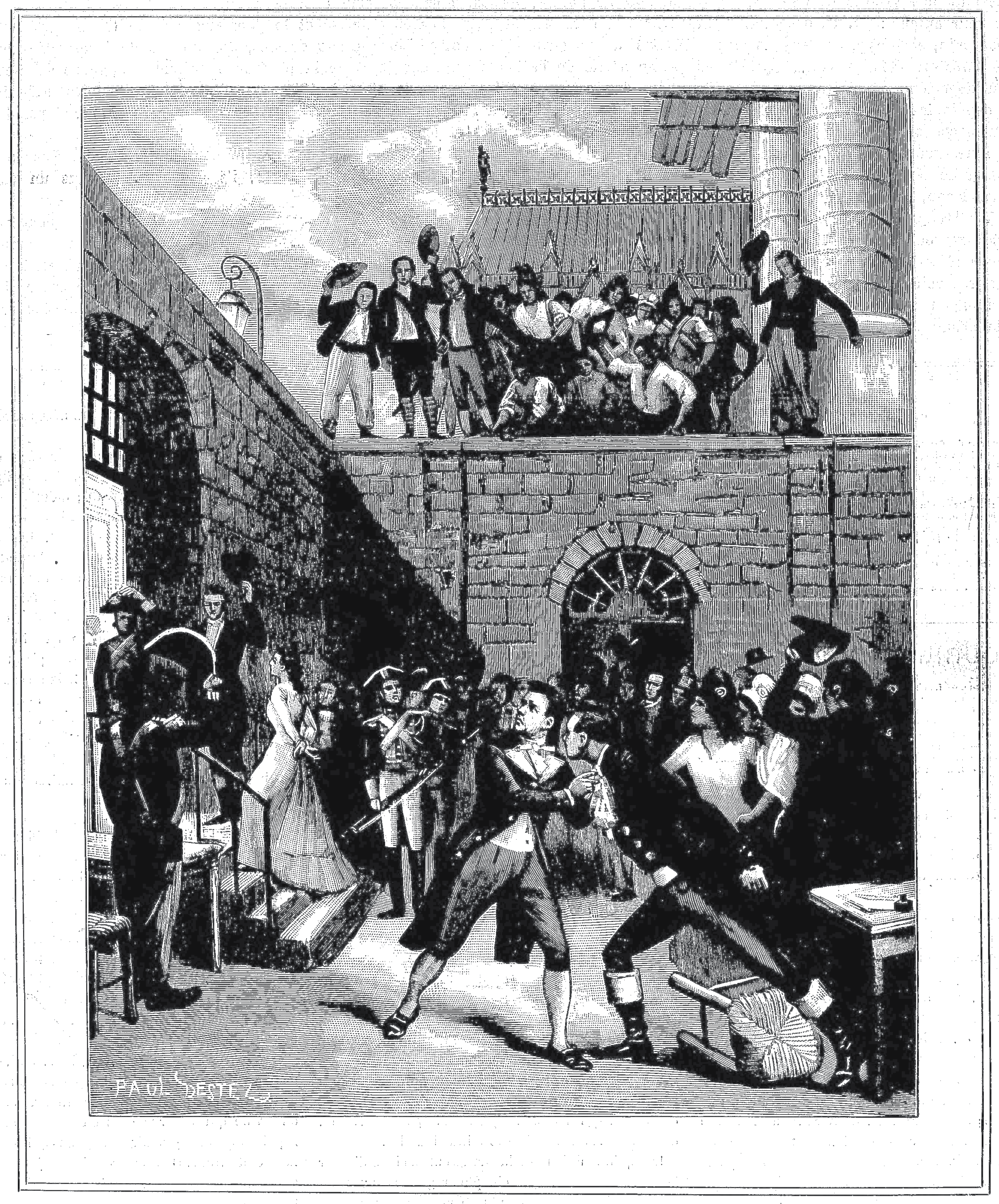
Victorien Sardou's Thermidor(play)

The play is one of seven Sardou plays set during the French Revolution, in this case the revolt of 27 July 1794 known as the Thermidorian Reaction. The plot follows a young actor, Labussière (based on a historical person), who infiltrates the revolutionary Committee of Public Safety and saves its potential victims by destroying their files.

== Performances ==
It was first staged on January 24, 1891 at the Comédie-Française with sets and costumes designed by the author, and executed by Eugène Carpezat, Philippe Chaperon, and others. In the next performance, on the 26th, radical Republican members of the audience took offense at Sardou's criticism of Maximilien Robespierre. They became threatening to the point of riot, with noise, confusion, shouted threats to Sardou's life, and police finally called to clear the crowd away.

The protesters were led by the socialist newspaper editor Prosper-Olivier Lissagaray and included the deputy Eugène Baudin.

The government of President Carnot prohibited the production from all state-funded venues. It would reopen years later, March 3, 1896, at the Théâtre de la Porte Saint-Martin, again starring Benoît-Constant Coquelin.

The play is named for the eleventh month of the French Republican calendar. Auguste Escoffier's Lobster Thermidor is named in honour of the play.

== Synopsis ==
Act I

It is the era of the French Revolution, just before the fall of Robespierre. It is five in the morning, the month July (Thermidor), and on the banks of the River Seine in Paris, between the Isle Louvier and the Arsenal, the washerwomen come to rinse and beetle soiled linen. Citizen Labussière, a former actor who has been appointed Registering Clerk to the Committee of Public Safety, comes to the banks of the Seine, accompanied by Lupin, for a purpose which requires the utmost secrecy. They meet an amateur fisherman who has come out at that early hour to avoid the reproaches of his wife. She is enraged at his conduct at the theatre the evening before when he applauded the hero of the play. The hero had denounced his wife because she pitied the victims of the guillotine. Labussière sends up the fisherman by leading him to complain about those who keep up the fashion of wearing powder in their hair while flour is so scarce that famine is imminent, and by reminding him that Robespierre himself always goes powdered. The fisherman is alarmed, and Lupin advises him to make himself scarce at once, which he does hastily.

As Labussière and Lupin are preparing to perform their secret task they are again interrupted by an artillery officer, one Martial Hujon. Labussière recognizes Martial as a former school-fellow and comrade in the army. Labussière sends Lupin over to the Isle Louviers to finish the work in hand, and remains conversing with Martial. Martial tells him that he is trying to find a young girl and novice of the Ursuline Convent named Fabienne. Last winter he rescued her from freezing to death when she was made homeless because of the suppression of the convent. Martial protected her and intended to marry her but his regiment was ordered abroad and they were forced to part for the time being. He had been wounded in the 1794 Battle of Fleurus, had been imprisoned and then exchanged, and returned bearing the colours won from the enemy. He presented the colours to Citizen Lazare Carnot whom he recognized as a former comrade in the Light Infantry. He was warmly received. Fabienne had disappeared and the friends with whom he left her had been executed. He searched for her everywhere, and at last saw her among the washerwomen on the banks of the Seine, but she disappeared into the crowd and now he can find no trace of her. He and Labussière lament the loss of the great men of the Revolution and the tyranny of Robespierre and his associates.

Lupin returns, announcing that the purpose for which he and Labussière had come had been achieved. They are about to depart when a frightful commotion is heard. Fabienne is seen surrounded by washerwomen who are about to throw her into the Seine because on hearing of the execution of an old abbess and a nun by the guillotine she had cried: "Jesus, what a horror!" The mob is led by a bully named Françoise. Fabienne is about to be drowned when Labussière and Martial interpose. Labussière points out to the mob that Fabienne cannot be an aristocrat since she is engaged to marry Martial, who is a soldier of the Republic and a hero of the Battle of Fleurus. The girl is released but ordered to cry: "Death to all aristocrats!" This she refuses to do, saying that she does not wish the death of anybody. The infuriated mob calls an agent of Robespierre, one Pourvoyer, to arrest Fabienne. Labussière orders Martial to keep quiet and leave all to him. The agent is carrying her off when Labussière puts on a hectoring air and on being asked for his card of citizenship, he calls Pourvoyer a dog and asks by what right he dares to demand it. Alarmed by the masterful manner of Labussière, Pourvoyer jumps to the conclusion that he must be a person in authority. He cringes before him and lays the blame on Françoise and the women. The women, on hearing that Labussière is in the employ of the Committee of Public Safety are terribly frightened and beg for pardon, vehemently crying out: "Pardon, citizen, pardon!" while Françoise adds, penitently: "Health and Fraternity!" to which Labussière answers, with covert satire: "And Death!"

Act II

Jacqueline is a costumer and Bérillon is a lamplighter at the theatre in which Labussière used to act, and are great friends of his. Jacqueline is dusting and arranging things in the room. Her husband, Jacques Bérillon is also a revolutionary soldier. He calls her by her classic name of "Carmagnole," which she refuses to answer to. She in turn mocks his antique surname of "Casca" and scoffs at the idea of rechristening their little boy Joseph by the terrible title of "Ça Ira," a quotation from a French revolutionary song which Bérillon has adopted to hide his own apathy and cowardice. After a long discussion on the difficulties of the times and their mutual hopes, Bérillon goes out to attend a meeting of the Convention to keep up his reputation as a true sans-culotte.

As soon as he has gone Labussière comes in, accompanied by Martial and Fabienne. Labussière describes to Jacqueline what happened at the river and requests her to receive Fabienne and be a mother to her. Jacqueline gladly promises to do so. Fabienne tells that after the departure of Martial and the loss of her home and friends, she was cast upon the world. By chance, she met Sister Marie-Thérése of the Ursuline Convent in the church of Notre Dame. The nave of the church was despoiled and turned into a store for barrels of wine and liquor. Sister Marie-Thérése had come into the church, like Fabienne, to pray due to the imminent peril of their lives. The sister, pitying the poor girl's sad condition was taking her home when she met Mother Angelique and ten other sisters, together with a novice. The women lived together, Fabienne assuming the household duties. It was in going to wash their linen that she was assaulted by the washerwomen and rescued by Labussière and Martial. After some talk, political and theatrical, Labussière tells them that he has retired temporarily from the stage because of a quarrel with a fellow actor who had denounced one of his companions. Labussière had assaulted the denouncer during rehearsal. Jacqueline, left desolate by Bérillon’s military and political avocations, leaves to attend to the shop. Fabienne expresses her gratitude to Labussière and learns that his position as Clerk of the Committee of Safety saved her life. Martial and Fabienne are disturbed when Labussière tells them that he was once in charge of registering condemned aristocrats. He explains that he had opportunities to save some of their lives, especially some members of the Comédie-Française who had been denounced. This reconciled him in a measure to the horrors of his office. He also congratulates himself on his talent as a comedian which has enabled him to deceive his superiors and to carry out his designs.

Fabienne, hearing the mention of Chief of Police Héron, tells them that Héron had married a woman of St. Malo before the Revolution who had been a servant in Fabienne's mother's house. He was a stableman. When turned out of the convent, Fabienne had called on the woman but she was not at home and Héron received her. He was tipsy and talked insolently to her, glorying in the downfall of her family and telling her, grossly, that she would be glad to clean his wife's shoes now. He drew her to him and she pushed him away. He was insulted and when he fell down because of his drunkenness, she fled the house. Labussière is very much alarmed at this and asks Fabienne to disguise herself in a peasant girl's costume which Jacqueline provides from the theatre wardrobe. Fabienne reluctantly puts on the costume. He then advises Martial to change his regimentals for a plain suit of clothes, saying that Héron will try to be revenged. Should he call for Pourvoyer, his agent, they would be recognised as Martial and Fabienne and would be denounced for the insult to Héron. While Fabienne changes her dress Labussière tells Martial that he must take Fabienne to Brussels and marry her for their own safety. Martial says he was only too willing, but that he fears that her affection for him has died out during his long absence. Labussière laughs at the notion and quits him to go and order dinner before their departure. When Martial proposes this plan to Fabienne she is terribly agitated and distressed, and after much pressing she confesses that despairing of ever seeing Martial again and believing him to be dead she has taken the final vow and is now Sister Mary Magdalene. A long scene ensues in which after much argument and persuasion Fabienne's love overcomes her sense of duty to religion, and she consents to flee with and marry Martial. She sends a letter to the nuns informing them of her decision. Martial now goes to keep an appointment with Labussière. To the horror and terror of Jacqueline and Fabienne, a procession is seen carrying Mother Angelique and the other nuns to prison. A police officer named Bouchard accuses Fabienne of having written the letter to the nuns as a way of warning them of their imminent arrest. She is immediately carried off, saying "It is not I that am to be pitied, but you."

Act III

In the office of the Registry of Prisoners (a dismantled room in Tuileries) the officials are assembled, waiting for Labussière. They are all anxious to go to the sitting of the National Convention, knowing that Robespierre will attempt to make himself an autocrat. They quarrel among themselves, taking different sides and on the arrival of Labussière they all rush off to the Convention, leaving him in charge of the office. They caution him to have the papers of the condemned all ready as the scaffold would not be at work that day, but would be glutted with victims the day after.

Martial comes to keep his appointment with Labussière and announces to him that Fabienne has consented to be his wife. Marteau comes in with news that a jail delivery will take place tomorrow. He brings a supplementary list of victims, among which is the name of Fabienne Lecoulteux. Héron has accused a girl of attempting to assassinate him and that she too has been arrested. They conclude that Martial's Fabienne is Héron’s accused. As soon as Marteau leaves, Martial pleads with Labussière to substitute one of three women with the name Fabienne Lecoulteux for his Fabienne. One is a woman of the streets, another is a woman of eighty-one years of age, and yet another, the mother of a family. Labussière struggles with the decision while the determination of Martial is to save Fabienne at any cost.
Lupin comes in and tells them that the discussion in the Convention is coming to a crisis and Robespierre is becoming furious at the opposition to his authority and plans. He also says that Fouquier Tinville has declared that he is tired of Labussière’s continual mislaying of the lists of the condemned and that he will hold him responsible in future—in fact, if Labussière does not make out his lists more accurately, he may make out his own condemnation.

In the midst of Labussière’s struggle between official duty and his friendship with Martial, the officials return in confusion, crying out that Robespierre has fallen and has been arrested, together with Marteau, Couthon and Saint-Just. Cries are heard in the streets as Robespierre and his associates are conveyed to the Committee of Public Safety. The infuriated people howl out: "Down with Robespierre! Down with the tyrant!" and the officials join in the cry: "Death to Robespierre! Long live the Republic!" while a voice outside answers: "Long live the Republic!" At that moment the crier's voice is heard outside: "Demand that Robespierre be outlawed together with his accomplices! Demand that he and they be arrested and tried!" The beat of the soldiers' drums is heard in the distance as the tumbrels advance, bearing Fabienne to her death.

Act IV

In the lesser court of the Conciergerie, Debrun, Brault and others, jailers, turn-keys, National Guards, gendarmes and executioners, including the Chief Headsman, Sanson, are waiting to send the tumbrels containing the condemned prisoners forth to the guillotine. Brault's daughter is watering her flowers at a window. All are talking about the late events and wondering what has been done with Robespierre, some being in his favour, others against him. Labussière and Martial enter, searching for Fabienne. Labussière is known to all as a government official, and has specially recommended himself to Madame and Mademoiselle Brault (the wife and daughter of the head jailer) by giving them free tickets to the theatre. Through them a note is conveyed to Fabienne, a letter and a flower, bidding Martial an eternal farewell and telling him that the sight of her companion nuns going to prison has recalled her to her religious duty, and that they must wait to meet in heaven.

Tavernier enters and tells how the President of the Convention, Citizen René-François Dumas has been arrested on the bench, by order of the Committee of Public Safety. Labussière and Martial take heart, supposing that the condemnations of the accused will be put off till the immediate matters in the Convention shall be settled. This hope, however, is frustrated by an announcement that the President's chair has been taken by Citizen Maire and the trial of the prisoners has gone forward and the condemned are to be taken to the place of execution in the tumbrels.

Labussière endeavours to delay the fatal procession to the guillotine by saying that in so uncertain a time, it would be a fearful risk to send the prisoners to execution until it was certain that Dumas was restored to power or executed himself. Fouquier Tinville, dining out with a friend, orders the tumbrels to proceed on their way despite the uncertainty. An inspiration then seizes Labussière who declares that Fabienne is a nun who has broken her vows for the sake of her lover, Martial, and is entitled to stay of execution because she is pregnant. Fabienne indignantly refuses to sign a document to this effect and upbraids Martial with trying to dishonour her in the eyes of God and of the world. Françoise and the other women strive hard to persuade her, but in vain. The beat of the soldiers' drums is played for the tumbrels to start at once. Martial then, in despair, swears that he is the father of the unborn child, and Françoise testifies to the truth of his assertion. Fabienne, however, swears that she is a pure virgin and a nun, and calls Martial a liar, although confessing her love for him, ending by exclaiming: "Farewell, and thanks for what you have done for me! My dearest Martial, I may now love you without sin!" She is borne off to execution. Martial, driven to despair, rushes to drag her from the tumbrel, but is shot by Tavernier and falls dead, his last word being: "Fabienne."

== Critic's review ==
Realism has never been brought to greater perfection. The howling of the mob, the tocsin, the revolting sayings and jests, are marvellously depicted. An epoch cannot be more strikingly and faithfully delineated. The piece is a denunciation of the terror which even now finds a few defenders and perhaps would-be repeaters, but there is nothing new in this indictment

— On the original production of the Comédie Française.
