= Lobster Thermidor =

French dish

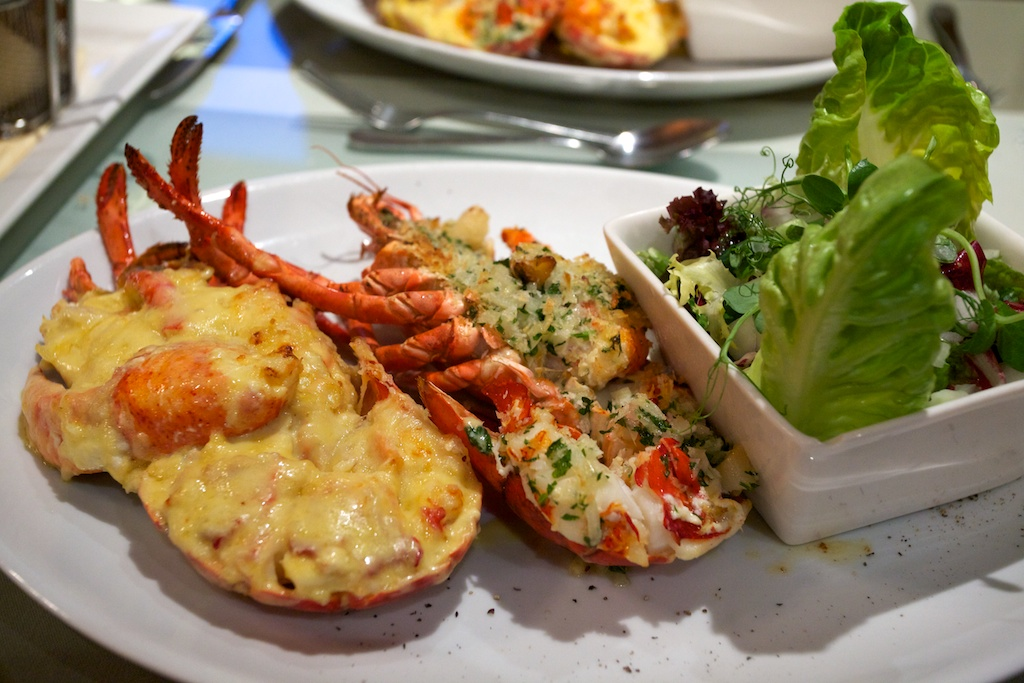
- Lobster Thermidor (left of plate)
- Place of origin: France
- Main ingredients: lobster meat, egg yolks, brandy, mustard

Lobster Thermidor is a French dish of lobster meat cooked in a rich wine sauce, stuffed into a lobster shell and browned. The sauce is often a mixture of egg yolks and brandy (such as Cognac), served with an oven-browned cheese crust, typically Gruyère. The sauce originally contained mustard, typically powdered.

== History ==
In January 1891, the play Thermidor by Victorien Sardou opened in the Comédie-Française theatre, named for month 11 in the new calendar of the French Revolution. It told the story of a young French clerk, Charles-Hippolyte Labussière, an employee of Robespierre's Committee of Public Safety who saved over 1,200 lives during the Reign of Terror by destroying documents condemning them to the guillotine. Four of those saved were actors of the Comédie-Française, thus inspiring a dish reminiscent of a play about a hero.

The recipe was possibly created at Café de Paris by Leopold Mourier, a former assistant to Auguste Escoffier. Another legend suggests it was created in 1894 at Chez Marie. Yet another source says it was created at Maison Maire, whose owner Mlle. Paillard sold the restaurant to Mourier. Maison Maire was a Parisian restaurant near the Théâtre de la Porte Saint-Martin. According to that account, Paillard created the name of the recipe due to the play's notoriety. The play was highly controversial and was closed by the authorities, re-opening in March 1896.

The lobster Thermidor at Maison Maire was served like homard Américain, which was made with tomatoes, cayenne, and brandy, but with the addition of English mustard. An early London recipe for Homard à l'Américaine referred to à la Thermidor as a version with the addition of English mustard, while an early American recipe for lobster Thermidor left out the tomatoes, cayenne, and mustard and added cream sauce thickened with Béarnaise sauce and a sprinkling of grated cheese. It can be served with Newberg sauce but is differentiated from lobster Newberg by the addition of tomatoes.

== See also ==
- List of seafood dishes
- List of stuffed dishes
- Eggs Sardou (Another dish created in honor of Sardou)
