= Córdoba Congress =

- Emblem of the FRE-AIT
- Native name: Congreso de Córdoba
- Date: December 25, 1872 – January 3, 1873
- Duration: 9 days
- Venue: Moratín Theater
- Location: Córdoba, Andalucía, Spain
- Also known as: Third Congress of the FRE-AIT
- Type: Congress
- Cause: Split of the Marxists from the FRE; Expulsion of the anarchists from the IWA
- Motive: Reorganization of the Spanish Regional Federation
- Organised by: Spanish Regional Federation of the International Workingmen's Association
- Outcome: Acceptance of the anarchist and anti-authoritarian theses; Adhesion to the Anarchist International; Reorganization of the FRE along anarchist lines

The Córdoba Congress was the Third Congress of the Spanish Regional Federation of the International Workingmen's Association (FRE-AIT). It was held in Córdoba between December 25, 1872 and January 3, 1873, just one month before King Amadeo I abdicated and the First Spanish Republic was subsequently proclaimed. Like what happened in the Hague Congress of 1872, the definitive rupture between anarchists, the majority, and Marxists, the minority, who no longer attended the Congress, was confirmed.

== Background ==
The conflict that arose in the Madrid Federation between anarchists and Marxists dealt with by the Zaragoza Congress reappeared two months after its closure when on June 2 the latter sent all sections of the International Alliance of Socialist Democracy a circular in which they announced that the Madrid section was self-dissolving and invited the rest to do the same. For this reason they were once again expelled from the Madrid Federation, but this time the Federal Council did not intervene because it was precisely the Alliance members who predominated. This attitude led to the resignation of Anselmo Lorenzo on June 20 from his post on the Federal Council.

The nine expelled, along with five other affiliates, decided to constitute the "New Madrid Federation", subsequently requesting its recognition by the Federal Council, but it was denied by the Federal Council, despite the fact that it received the adhesion of other Federations. Then the London General Council intervened and accepted the New Madrid Federation as a member of the IWA, independently of the Spanish Regional Federation (FRE). Shortly after, between September 2 and 7, the Hague Congress of 1872 was held in which the definitive break between Marxists and anarchists was to take place. The Marxist split in the FRE was only followed by a dozen local federations, made up of about 200 militants, while the rest of the federations, some 150 with 15,000 members, remained faithful to the "apolitical" anarchist line.

The four FRE representatives who came to The Hague were anarchists - Farga Pellicer, Morago, Marselau (a former religious republican who would end up in the ranks of the Carlists) and Alerini (a refugee from the Paris Commune). Representing the New Madrid Federation were Paul Lafargue —who would no longer return to Spain— and the director of the newspaper La Emancipación, José Mesa. In Congress, the Marxist theses approved in previous congresses, such as those relating to "the constitution of the proletariat into a political party" and the connection between the economic struggle and the political struggle, were ratified by a large majority. The four FRE delegates aligned themselves with the anarchists, so when Congress decided to expel Mikhail Bakunin and his Swiss ally James Guillaume from the International for not having dissolved the International Alliance of Socialist Democracy, as they had committed and signed together with other delegates a manifesto showing their disagreement. All of them, including Giuseppe Fanelli and Errico Malatesta, decided to meet in Saint-Imier to hold a separate Congress in which they rejected the expulsion of Bakunin and Guillaume, did not recognize the General Council appointed in The Hague and approved a resolution that collected the anarchist theses and that contradicted the policy defended by the International by insisting that "the destruction of all political power is the first duty of the proletariat ..." "Any allegedly provisional and revolutionary political power… can only be a hoax.” It was also agreed that the regional federations would interact with each other outside of the General Council, with which they were in fact separated from the International. In this way the anarchist split of the International Workingmen's Association was consummated.

== Development ==
The Córdoba Congress was scheduled for April 1873 but the Federal Council decided to advance it and was held it between December 25, 1872 and January 3, 1873. 46 delegates met at the Moratín Theater in Córdoba — plus five members of the Council, among them Severino Albarracín and Francisco Tomás Oliver - who represented 42 local Federations and 10 trade unions — at that time the FRE counted some 29,000 members. The largest federation was that of Barcelona, which then had about 7,000 members, followed by other Catalan federations (Sants, Sant Martí de Provençals) and that of Alcoy — the latter with some 2,000 affiliates. The "authoritarian" New Madrid Federation, formed around the newspaper La Emancipación or the federations linked to it, such as those of Lleida and Zaragoza, did not attend.

The socio-professional composition of the delegates was as follows: 10 weavers and spinners; 5 carpenters; 4 bricklayers; 4 paperists; 3 agricultural workers; 2 students; 2 painters; 2 beds; 2 cabinetmakers; 2 shoe racks; 2 smelters; 2 adjusters; 2 locksmiths; 2 hatters; 1 tanner; 1 cooper; 1 rope maker; 1 printer (Farga Pellicer); 1 baker; 1 recorder; 1 cylinder; 1 marble maker; 1 teacher; 1 primary school teacher.

The resolution that obliges the internationalists to establish themselves as a political party and that declares that the first duty of the proletariat is the conquest of political power, the commission considers contrary to the broad base of the International Workingmen's Association, which aims to collect in its bosom of redemption to all those who suffer the injustices of the present Society, because far from tending to unite the efforts of all those who are interested in emancipation, it tends to alienate and repudiate all those who are not in agreement with the political program that the general council or a congress were pleased to elaborate. The commission also believes that by affirming that "the first duty of the proletariat is the conquest of political power" is to declare that social unrest, that is, social injustices, come from the evil of governments; and it is to deny or hide that they have their origin in the institutions of the present society, of which they are natural emanations of the political powers. To consign this first duty to the working class, is to deny all the considerations of the General Statutes of the International, and is to distract the working class from the path that to achieve its emancipation it must follow, and which is to tend to destroy all powers and not to conquer them; for if it were to conquer it for itself, it would only do what all classes have done up to now, and it would be completely unaware of its great mission of realizing justice, at the same time as for it, for all humanity.
If the working class did so, it would seek and obtain the destruction of the existing privileges in order to become privileged; but it would not destroy all privileges, and would therefore lack the motto that is written on its flag, which reads: "We do not want privileges even for ourselves"

— Opinion of the Congress on the "attitude of the Regional Federation in view of international congresses of The Hague and Saint-Imier".

The Congress rejected the "authoritarian" resolutions of the Hague Congress and accused the General Council of trying to create a political party led by the bourgeoisie and mediated by supporters of Marx, members of the "authoritarian communist party." Instead it passed the "anti-authoritarian" resolutions of the St. Imier Congress, aligning itself completely with the new Anarchist International. In coherence with its proclaimed "anti-authoritarianism", it was decided to abolish the Federal Council and replace it with a Correspondence and Statistics Commission based in Alcoy, formed by Severino Albarracín (teacher high school), Francisco Tomás Oliver (bricklayer), Miguel Pino (adjuster, from Ciudad Real) and Vicente Fombuena (foundry, from Alcoy). Later, the five regional secretaries appointed by the respective local federations were integrated into the Commission.

In Congress, the "new" federations formed by the Marxists were roundly condemned for considering that they "work against the aims of the International, help the bourgeoisie, giving it so much strength against the proletariat and against the true social revolution like the one they manage to extract from the bosom of the Spanish Regional Federation". They also advised "all sincerely revolutionary workers, whatever their particular opinions, [to] return with them to the bosom of their respective Sections to fight for their victory and to contribute to the most important of all, that is, to the triumph of the cause of the work on capital, and that they leave in the void those who voluntarily and intentionally want to continue being constituted in a group of damaging divisions that would weaken us."

Consequently, Congress "unanimously" supported the decision of the Madrid Federation to expel the Marxist group from La Emancipación - whose conduct was "anathematized", recognizing "pretensions and bad faith" - and which subsequently had founded the New Madrid Federation.

In addition, Congress approved a resolution in defense of the Alliance of Socialist Democracy, in which those who had belonged to it abstained (among others Rafael Farga Pellicer, Tomás González Morago, José García Viñas, Francisco Tomás Oliver), and that said:

…that there has been no more than an active and fruitful propaganda of the collectivist and anarchic ideas that the Association wishes, and therefore [the Commission] also recognizes the conduct of the allianceist allies as good, since the generality of those who to said Association belonged to those who have done the most work for the International, contributing to its development; and above all, this Commission recalls that one of the most important acts of the Spanish Federation was its birth, and this was due to the activity and initiative that the Alliance's José Fanelli demonstrated to build the International in Spain; Therefore, until it has proven news of the acts carried out by said Association, to protect the bourgeoisie against the interests of the working class, in which case it would place it among the enemy societies of the worker.

An opinion was also approved on "Means to establish purely international schools in the greatest possible number of means" in which it was said that the "revolutionary socialist instruction of the worker [is] the lever that will remove and annihilate the old world by consolidating a complete revolution that, regenerating us from the yoke of ignorance, will pave the way for our complete social regeneration. The instruction that is convenient for us, and in general the instruction of all kinds, we must provide ourselves ... Obviously the teaching that is spreading in the present society is poisoned by the authoritarian, clerical and bourgeois virus — force, sham and exploitation — very useful to obtain the result we are witnessing: to make man the slave of man, intellectually, politically and economically."

== Consequences ==
Those expelled who formed the "New Madrid Federation" held a Congress in Toledo on March 25, 1873 to constitute the "New Spanish Federation", along with eleven other "new" local federations that had been formed in Cádiz, Zaragoza, Denia, Pont de Vilumara, Alcalá, Gràcia, Játiva, Gasteiz, Toledo, Valencia and Lleida, although only delegates from the last four attended. The following month it had to shut down the newspaper La Emancipación due to lack of resources, despite the efforts of José Mesa and Pablo Iglesias, and that Friedrich Engels had put money out of his own pocket. The last issue was published on April 12, 1873. "The Marxist group, lacking followers and without a spokesman to spread its doctrines, was condemned to a forced silence." The New Madrid Federation ended up dissolving shortly after. José Mesa, director of La Emancipación, sent Engels a letter shortly before the newspaper closed in which he said:

I believe that any attempt to move immediately to the proletarian revolution in Spain will end in a massacre. I also believe that the bourgeois republic has a meaning here ... but we must not give the impression that we treat them [republicans] with moderation and above all we must not, not for a moment, deny that we aspire to carry out the social revolution, if we want to found a workers' party in Spain, since the people of this country are always on the side of the most active party.

== Bibliography ==
- Avilés Farré, Juan (2013). La daga y la dinamita. Los anarquistas y el nacimiento del terrorismo (in Spanish). Barcelona: Tusquets Editores. ISBN 978-84-8383-753-5.
- Lida, Clara E. (1973). Antecedentes y desarrollo del movimiento obrero español (1835-1888). Textos y documentos (in Spanish). Madrid: Siglo XXI. ISBN 84-323-0098-5.
- Termes, Josep (1977). Anarquismo y sindicalismo en España. La Primera Internacional (1864-1881) (in Spanish). Barcelona: Crítica. ISBN 84-7423-023-3.
- Termes, Josep (2011). Historia del anarquismo en España (1870-1980) (in Spanish). Barcelona: RBA. ISBN 978-84-9006-017-9.
- Tuñón de Lara, Manuel (1977) [1972]. El movimiento obrero en la historia de España. I.1832-1899 (in Spanish) (2 ed.). Barcelona: Laia. ISBN 84-7222-331-0.
