= Francesc Tomàs Oliver =

Spanish politician (1850–1903)

- Born: 1850; Palma, Mallorca, Balearic Islands, Spain
- Died: 1903 (aged 52–53); Madrid, Spain
- Occupation: Bricklayer
- Years active: 1868–1903
- Era: Sexenio Democrático; Restoration
- Organization(s): FRE-AIT (1870–1881); FTRE (1881–1888)
- Political party: PRDF (1868–1870)
- Movement: Collectivist anarchism

Francesc Tomàs Oliver (1850–1903) was a Spanish anarchist, a bricklayer by profession, who said that the labor movement had to be led by "workers with calluses on their hands." A member of the Federal Commission of the Spanish Regional Federation of the International Workingmen's Association (1870–1881) and of its successor the Federation of Workers of the Spanish Region (1881–1888), he was the author of the first history of the beginnings of anarchism in Spain in the form of 16 articles that appeared in La Revista Social between December 27, 1883, and January 15, 1885, with the title Del nacimiento de las ideas anárquico-colectivista en España (English: On the birth of anarchic-collectivist ideas in Spain).

== Biography ==
He initially he was a member of the Federal Democratic Republican Party and in 1869 he held the position of vice president of the Federal Democratic School in his hometown, Palma de Mallorca. On December 29, 1869, he signed a manifesto to the workers of the Federal Center of the workers' societies of Palma, of which he was also president. Shortly after he joined the International Workingmen's Association, he was expelled from the Federal Democratic School.

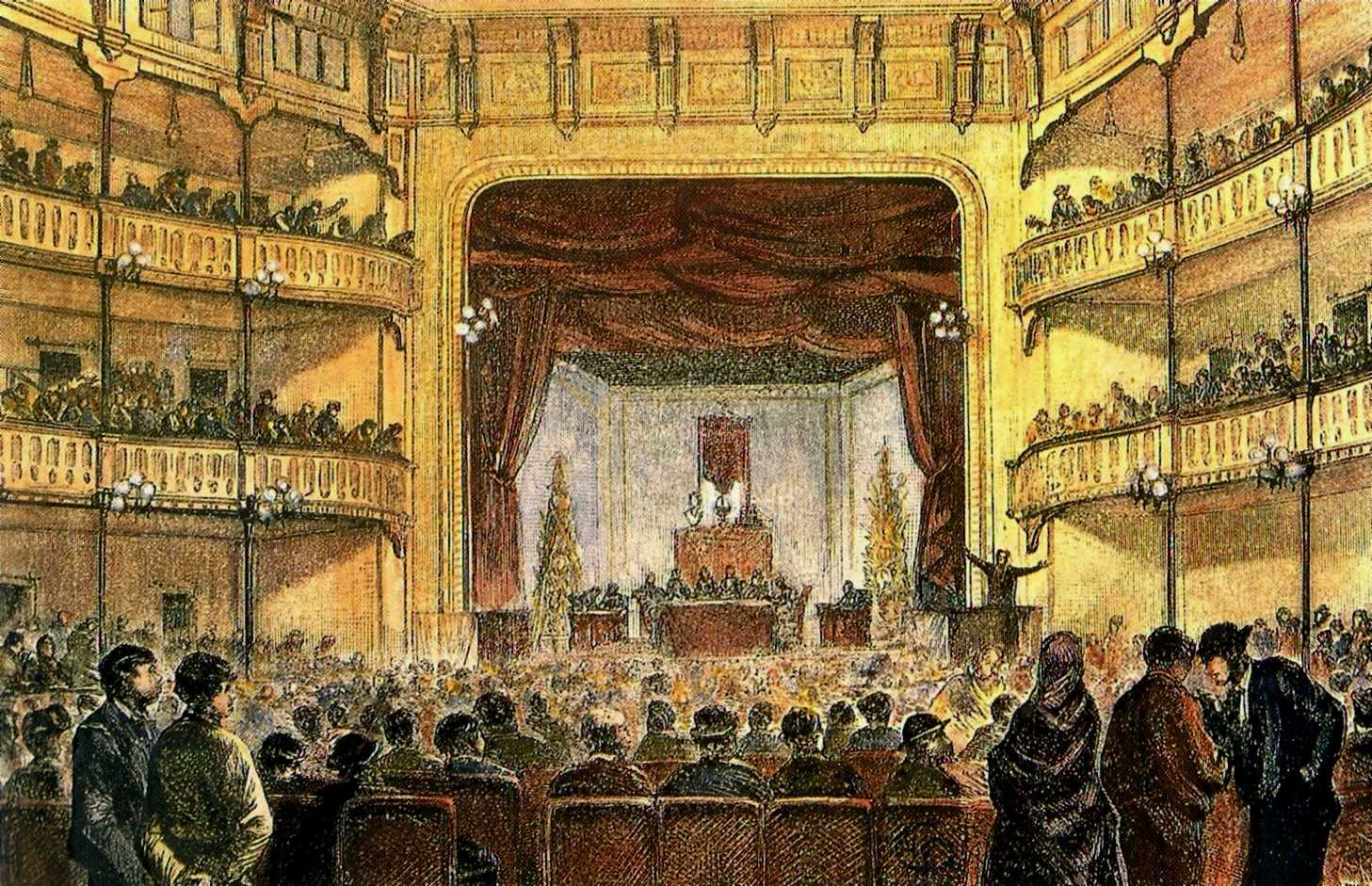
An engraving of the 1870 Barcelona Workers' Congress in which Francesc Tomàs participated on behalf of the Balearic Islands.

He participated in representation of the Balearic Islands in the 1870 Barcelona Workers' Congress from which the Spanish Regional Federation of the IWA (FRE-AIT) arose, assuming the anarcho-collectivist theses of Mikhail Bakunin's International Alliance of Socialist Democracy. The following year he spent about four months in prison for some of his articles published in La Revolución Social against the king of Spain Amadeo I.

He participated in the Valencia Conference, settling in that city, and in the Zaragoza Congress, where he was elected to the Federal Council by the Eastern Region. He was re-elected in the Córdoba Congress for which he intervened in the Petroleum Revolution of Alcoy of July 1873; he was part of the AIT commission that met with the mayor Agustí Albors. When the troops were about to enter the city, he left Alcoy to go to Madrid along with the rest of the Federal Commission, of which he continued to form part during the clandestine period (1874-1881).

In 1881 he was elected a member of the Federal Commission of the new Federation of Workers of the Spanish Region (FTRE), being reelected in the Seville Congress held the following year. There he led, together with Josep Llunas, the opposition to illegalism and anarcho-communism. After leaving the Federal Commission due to the internal crisis experienced by the FTRE as a result of the Mano Negra affair, he began to write in La Revista Social the series of articles that would form the first history of the beginnings of anarchism in Spain, and that would be published in book form in A Coruña in 1893 with the title Del nacimiento de las ideas anárquico-colectivista en España (English: On the birth of anarchic-collectivist ideas in Spain). He also wrote between 1882 and 1884 Crónica de los Trabajadores de la Región Española (English: Chronicle of the Workers of the Spanish Region).

After the disappearance of the FTRE, he remained faithful to his anarcho-collectivist ideas and in 1900 he was elected president of the Madrid workers' society "El Porvenir del Obrero". He continued to collaborate until his death in 1903 in anarchist publications such as Tierra y Libertad.

== Bibliography ==
- Iñiguez, Miguel (2001). Esbozo de una Enciclopedia histórica del anarquismo español (in Spanish). Madrid: Fundación de Estudios Libertarios Anselmo Lorenzo. ISBN 84-86864-45-3.
- Termes, Josep (2011). Historia del anarquismo en España (1870-1980) (in Spanish). Barcelona: RBA. ISBN 978-84-9006-017-9.
