= Madrid Congress =

Fourth Congress of the Spanish Regional Federation

- Emblem of the FRE-AIT
- Native name: Congreso de Madrid
- Date: 21–27 June 1874
- Duration: 6 days
- Location: Madrid, Spain
- Also known as: Fourth Congress of the FRE-AIT
- Cause: Deposition of the federal republican government in a military coup; Criminalisation of the FRE-AIT by Francisco Serrano
- Motive: The reorganization of the FRE-AIT
- Organised by: Spanish Regional Federation of the International Workingmen's Association
- Outcome: Decentralization of the FRE-AIT into a clandestine cell system; Adoption of insurrectionary anarchist tactics

The Madrid Congress was the Fourth Congress of the Spanish Regional Federation of the International Workingmen's Association (FRE-AIT) that was held in Madrid in June 1874.

Unlike the previous three, the congress was held in hiding since the International had been banned five months earlier by Francisco Serrano, new head of government and state after the triumph of Manuel Pavia's coup d'état that ended the First Spanish Republic. In the Madrid Congress it was decided that no more general congresses would be held until legality was recovered, being replaced by regional congresses. The Congress also ratified the anarchist theses of the Anarchist International to which the FRE had been attached since its foundation in the St. Imier Congress of September 1872.

== Background ==
On 10 January 1874, after the triumph of Manuel Pavia's coup d'état and with the imminent fall of the Canton of Cartagena, the last stronghold of the cantonal rebellion, the government of Francisco Serrano decreed the dissolution of the International in Spain "considering that the principles upheld and put into practice by the International Workingmen's Association are opposed to the right, morality and freedom of work ..." Its premises were quickly occupied by the Civil Guard and its press closed. Six days earlier, the Federal Commission had assessed the latest events in this way: "The grotesque dictatorship of the apostate Castelar and his accomplices has produced the coup d'état of 3 January 1874. The civil dictatorship has fallen to give way to the military dictatorship, which has dissolved bourgeois legality by shooting."

Immediately the Federal Commission agreed on a series of measures to keep FRE-AIT's activity underground. In Circular No. 38 issued on 12 January, it recommended that the federations put "important documents and objects in a safe place" and reiterated the need to divide the sections into small and secret groups, "or adopting the form that each federation in use of its autonomy it considers more correct". It encouraged members to defend themselves in the name of justice within or outside "bourgeois law" - arguing that "the natural rights of association and assembly are prior to and superior to any law, and that no one can restrict them or violate their freedom" - without ruling out the use of violence, since bourgeois institutions "are sustained by force, only by force can they be overthrown." Thus the Federations should "organize as many revolutionary groups as possible, in order to be ready and waiting for the revolutionary socialist action of the proletariat." "The social war, the class war, the war between rich and poor so many times provoked by the bourgeoisie, should not scare us in the least, because we are sure that Reason and Justice are with us, and that the triumph it will be of the sons of Labor".

In the Circular no. 41 of 16 April 1874, the Federal Commission convened the Fourth Congress of the FRE-AIT which was finally held secretly in Madrid.

== Development ==
Despite the difficulties imposed by the outlawing, the FRE managed to hold between 21 and 27 June the secret Congress of Madrid (the fourth of its history) which was attended by representatives of 48 Federations and in which aid was approved for the victims of repression and ratified the agreements reached at the Geneva Congress of the Anarchist International held in September of the previous year. At that time the FRE was made up of 198 local federations with 347 sections.

It was agreed that there would be no more general congresses of the FRE, being replaced by secret regional conferences "to be held successively, with the attendance at each of them by a delegate from the Federal Commission, bearer of the [sic] order of the day, of the agreements and of the votes, to be summarized later in a common whole within the Federal Commission." Ten "regions" were established: Catalonia, Valencia, Aragon, Eastern Andalusia, Western Andalusia, Murcia, New Castile, Old Castile, Extremadura and Vasco-Navarra-Santanderina. The first important "regional" conference - the Catalan one - was held in Sants on 10 June 1875.

The issue of strikes was also discussed, on which it was agreed to advise against the use of the general strike "as the last peaceful means of transforming society" and to recommend that the workers, instead, "take a free and decidedly revolutionary road, devoting all its efforts to preparing and organizing the great international revolution. It was also requested "that the number of partial strikes be reduced as much as possible; that they should not be used and favored other than from the point of view of propaganda and organization." "The duty of retaliation" was also proclaimed as long as the workers had their rights. In this way, the FRE opted for the insurrectionary path and began "to give wings to nihilism (personal reprisals, property destruction) that soon after was going to reach great flights, especially in Andalusia."

This more radical and violent orientation had already manifested itself before the Congress was held. Thus in the "Manifesto" made public in March it was said that from today until the social revolution had triumphed:

every exploiter, every idler living on income, every parasitic capitalist ... [who has inflicted on us] a serious offense or has violated our rights, will fall under the blows of an invisible arm, and their properties will be turned over to the fire …

In the Memoria of the Federal Commission presented by the FRE delegate at the Brussels Congress of the Anarchist International dated 23 August 1874, it also said:

We are pleased to announce that some nefarious exploiters will no longer insult the workers, since some houses, factories, etc., have been consumed by flames ... This class war will cost the exploiters more dearly, that they will lose their property, that we poor people have nothing to lose because they have stolen everything from us.

According to Clara Lida the celebration of the Madrid Congress was proof of the FRE's ability to develop in such adverse circumstances "original clandestine patterns of organization, propaganda and resistance" —another test would be the clandestine press, "whose abundance and appearance at such unfavorable junctures never ceases to surprise". It also managed to maintain contact with European internationalists "through travel, correspondence, presence at or adhesion to secret meetings," and sent delegates to all Congresses of the Anarchist International.

== Bibliography ==
- Lida, Clara E. (2010). "La Primera Internacional en España, entre la organización pública y la clandestinidad (1868-1889)". In Julián Casanova (ed.). Tierra y Libertad. Cien años de anarquismo en España (in Spanish). Barcelona: Crítica. pp. 33–59. ISBN 978-84-9892-119-9.
- Termes, Josep (1977). Anarquismo y sindicalismo en España. La Primera Internacional (1864-1881) (in Spanish). Barcelona: Crítica. ISBN 84-7423-023-3.
- Termes, Josep (2011). Historia del anarquismo en España (1870-1980) (in Spanish). Barcelona: RBA. ISBN 978-84-9006-017-9.
- Tuñón de Lara, Manuel (1977) [1972]. El movimiento obrero en la historia de España. I.1832-1899 (in Spanish) (2nd ed.). Barcelona: Laia. ISBN 84-7222-331-0.
