= Labor movement in Spain =

2026 International Workers' Day event in Logroño

The labor movement in Spain began in Catalonia in the 1830s and 1840s, although it was during the Democratic Sexenio when it was really born with the founding of the Spanish Regional Federation of the First International (FRE-AIT) at the Workers' Congress of Barcelona in 1870. During the Restoration, the two major Spanish trade union organizations were founded, the socialist Unión General de Trabajadores (UGT, 1888) and the anarcho-syndicalist Confederación Nacional del Trabajo (CNT, 1910), with the latter predominating until the Second Spanish Republic. CNT and UGT were the protagonists of the social revolution that took place in the Republican zone during the first months of the Spanish Civil War. During Franco's dictatorship, the two historical centers were harshly repressed until they practically disappeared. In the final stage of Franco's regime, a new organization called Workers' Commissions (in Spanish: Comisiones Obreras) emerged, which together with the reconstituted UGT, will be the two majority unions from the beginning of the new democratic period until the present day.

== Workers' movement up to the Spanish Civil War ==
=== Origins (1830-1868) ===
"Insurrections are as old in Spain as the rule of the Palace favorites against whom they have usually been directed". Karl Marx, Revolutionary Spain (New York Daily Tribune, Sept. 9, 1854).

The origins of the labor movement in Spain are located in Catalonia in the 1830s and 1840s as it was the only place where there was a modern industry, the cotton textile sector. It was there that the first conflicts between workers and employers took place, and it was there that the first union was founded in 1840 —a friendly society as it was called at the time— in the history of Spain, the Barcelona Weavers Association (Asociación de Tejedores de Barcelona). In a letter dated October 17, 1854, Karl Marx wrote to Friedrich Engels:

"The careful study of the Spanish revolutions makes clear the fact that they needed about forty years to demolish the material basis of the domination of the priests and the aristocracy, but in that time they succeeded in making a complete revolution in the old social regime".

Also in Catalonia, the first general strike took place in 1855, during the progressive biennium —a period of extension of the movement to other areas of Spain— and also in Catalonia the first Workers' Congress met in 1865, followed by another in 1868, the latter held after the triumph of the Glorious Revolution of 1868, which by recognizing for the first time freedom of association put an end, at least momentarily, to the persecutions and prohibitions that incipient workerism had suffered during the previous forty years.

With the formation in Spain of the first two groups of the First International in 1869, one in Madrid and the other in Barcelona, a new stage in the history of the workers' movement in Spain began, in which, as Manuel Tuñón de Lara warns, "for the first time, class consciousness was expressed at a level in which the entire system of production relations, institutions and values was called into question".

=== Democratic Sexennium (1868-1874) ===
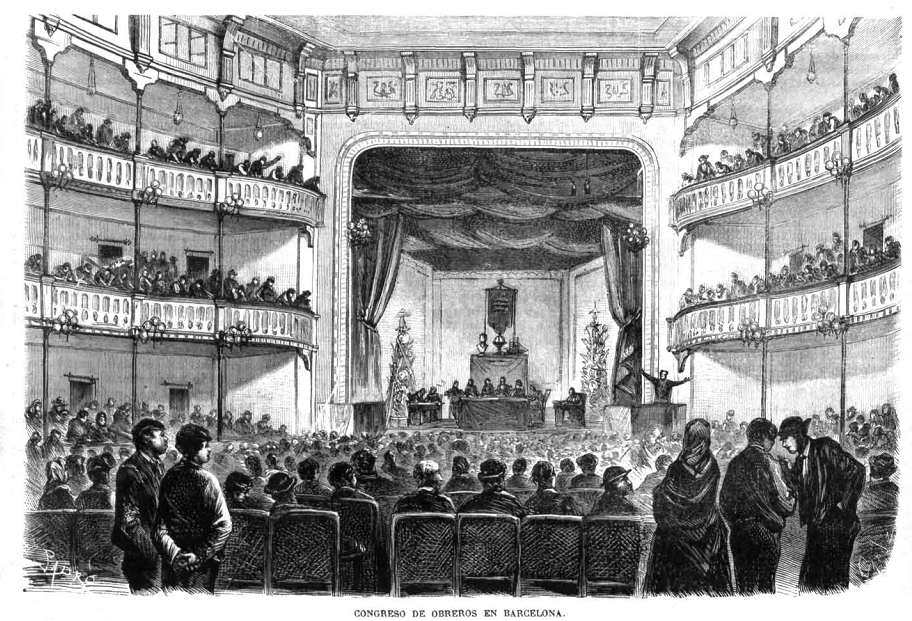
Congreso Obrero de Barcelona de 1870, drawing by Padró, engraving by Capuz, in La Ilustración Española y Americana.

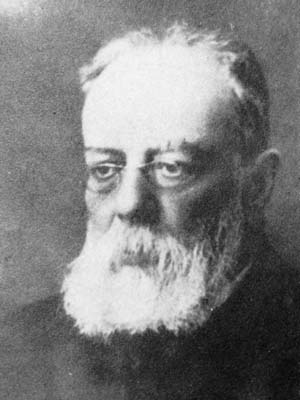
Anselmo Lorenzo, grandfather of Spanish anarchism.

The First International (originated in London in 1864) was organized in Spain through the Spanish Regional Federation of the IWA strongly influenced by the Bakuninist International Alliance of Socialist Democracy). Thus, the Spanish labor movement had a preponderance of anarchist sectors, as opposed to the socialist preponderance of most of the rest of Europe.

"In Spain, the International was founded first as a simple appendix of Bakunin's secret society, the Alliance, which was to serve as a kind of recruiting base and, at the same time, as a lever to manipulate the entire proletarian movement. You are going to see now that the Alliance is also openly trying today to put the International in Spain back in the same subordinate position in which it had it before.

Because of this dependence, the peculiar doctrines of the Alliance: the immediate abolition of the State, anarchy, anti-authoritarianism, abstention from all political acts, etc., were preached in Spain as doctrines of the International. At the same time, every prominent member of the International was suddenly included in the secret organization and imbued with the belief that this system of direction of the public association by the secret society existed everywhere and was a matter of course. [...]

In June 1870 the first Congress of the Spanish International was held in Barcelona, where the plan of organization was adopted which was then fully deployed at the Valencia Conference (September 1871), which is in force today and which has already given the best results.

The same as in all other places, the participation that our Association had (on a par with that which was attributed to it) in the revolution of the Paris Commune, also gave preponderance to the International in Spain. This preponderance and the first governmental persecutions, which followed immediately afterwards, greatly increased our ranks in Spain. However, at the time the Valencia Conference was convened, there were only thirteen local federations in the country, apart from some isolated sections in various places. [...]

Immediately after the Valencia Conference, the London Conference was held (September 1871). The Spaniards sent a delegate, Anselmo Lorenzo, and he was the first to bring to Spain the news that the secret Alliance was inconceivable in our Association, and that, on the contrary, the General Council and the majority of the federations were decidedly against the Alliance, for its existence was already known at that time."

Friedrich Engels (1872) "Report of the General Council on the situation in Spain, Portugal and Italy".

In 1870 the FRE-AIT had 30,000 members and the Alliance eventually achieved the domination of the Federation, imposing in the Barcelona Workers' Congress of 1870 the anarchist program: to abstain from political activity (not to create a workers' party and not to vote) and the defense of "direct action". Meanwhile, Marxism defended the need for an organized and centralized workers' democracy, and to reach it defended the need for a workers' political party.

=== Restoration (1875-1931) ===
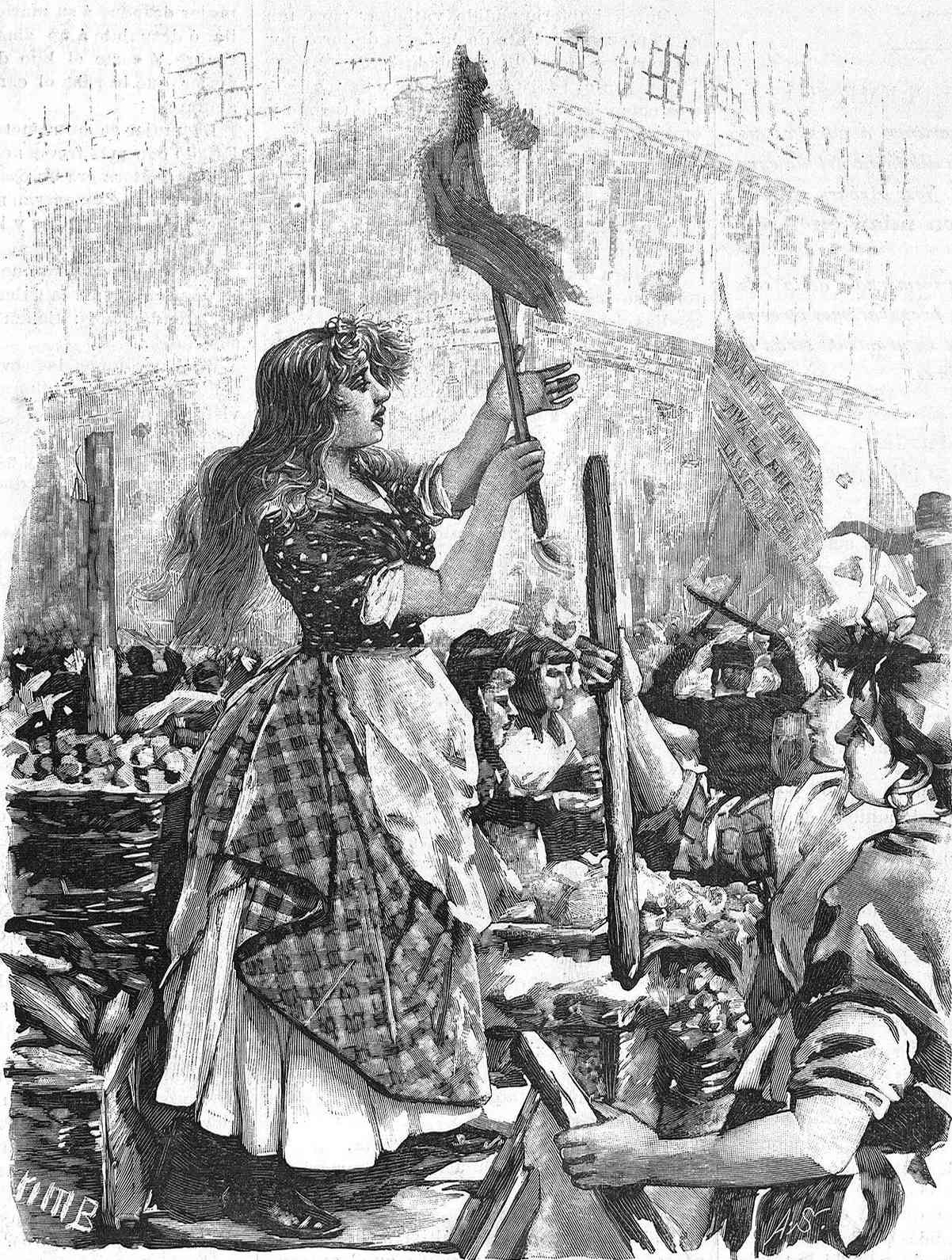
Greengrocers' mutiny in Madrid (1892)

The break between Marx and Bakunin occurred in 1872, leaving the Spanish Federation aligned with the latter, without having created any workers' party, which was supplemented with anti-electoral slogans or with occasional support for the federal republicans. Meanwhile, the minority Marxist group tried to fill this vacuum with the creation of the workers' party PSOE in 1879 and the working class union UGT in 1888. It can be said that in Spain there was no Catholic-social movement properly speaking before the encyclical Rerum novarum of Pope Leo XIII in 1891. The exception would be the workers' unions of the Jesuit Antonio Vicent. In 1895, the workers' circles numbered 169 and their membership exceeded 36,000.

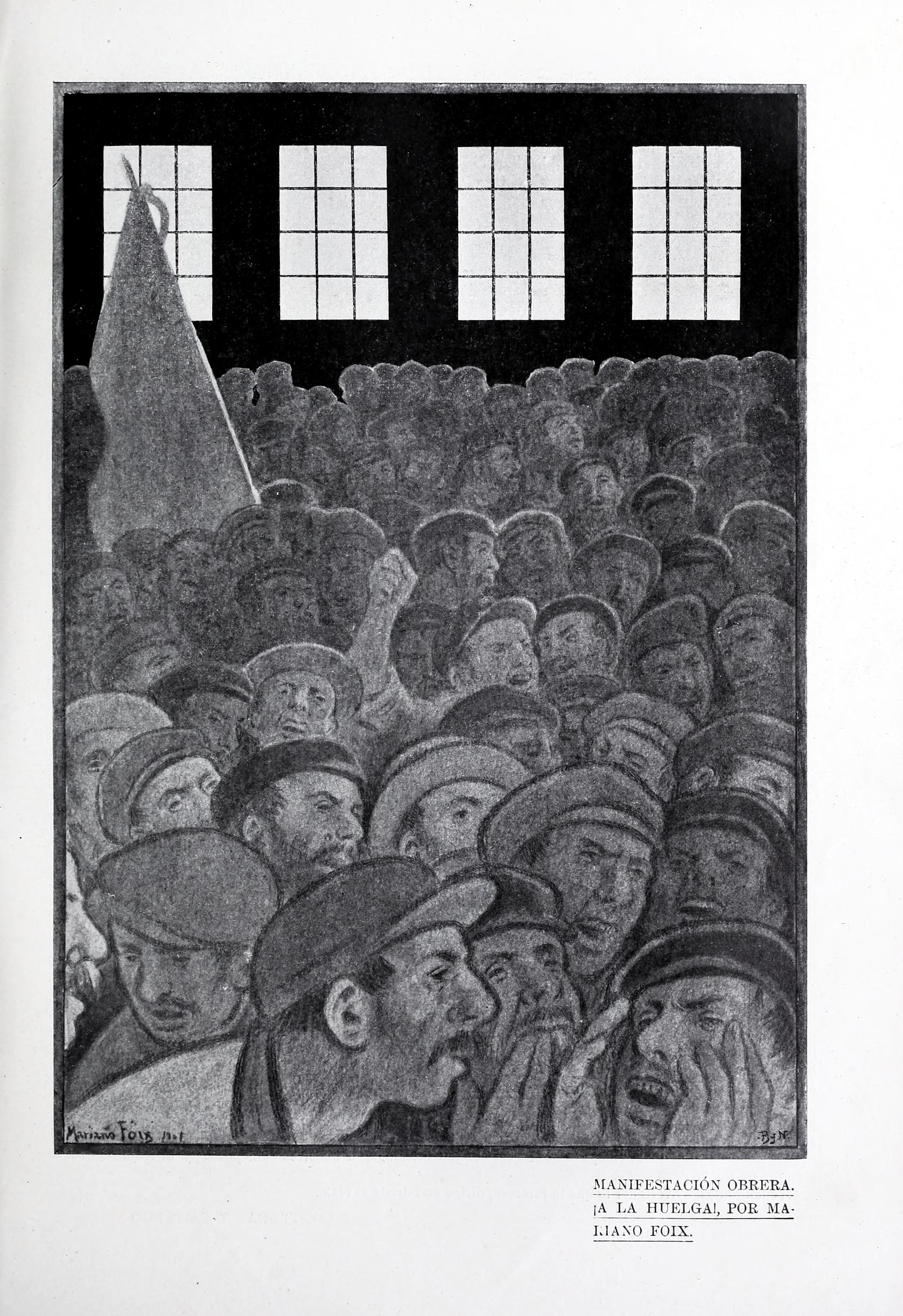
Workers' demonstration. Let's go on strike! By Mariano Foix (1901)

With the new 20th century, there was a development of the workers' movement, highlighting the industrialization of Asturias, the Basque Country, and Catalonia. At that time there were also divergences in Spanish anarchism. There were anti-union "purist" currents, currents in favor of individual terrorism and finally there were anarcho-syndicalist currents, based on the theory of revolutionary syndicalism coherently formulated by French revolutionary theorists.

It was in Spain where anarcho-syndicalism managed to create a true mass force. In 1907 the trade union confederation Solidaridad Obrera was founded in Barcelona, of anarcho-syndicalist tendency, and which published an organ of expression of the same name, a newspaper popularly known as the "Soli". With the economic recession of 1908-1909, faced with layoffs and wage reduction, the "Soli" raises the possibility of a general strike. With the call-up of recruits for the war in Melilla, this strike broke out. The result: the Tragic Week of Barcelona.

The anarcho-syndicalists, with control of the "Soli", call a National Workers' Congress in Barcelona in 1910. They agreed to create the CNT (National Confederation of Labor), which would become the main mass union of the Spanish working class until the civil war, surpassing the UGT. Composed of unions "without ideology" in principle, they have little organizational discipline, trying to avoid the promotion of the strike as an economic weapon to stop the "direct action". The anarcho-syndicalist or revolutionary syndicalist character of the CNT was clear.

This trade union center, if in the State as a whole it surpassed the UGT, in Catalonia it became almost the only center (especially important because Catalonia was the largest Spanish working class region). The CNT and the UGT had an almost exclusively working-class character, with very few middle-class intellectuals. Their tone was "coarse" and of a decidedly proletarian anti-intellectualism. And yet, the magazines and libraries that their groupings promoted contributed to the culturization of the working class in those years when public education was conspicuous by its absence.

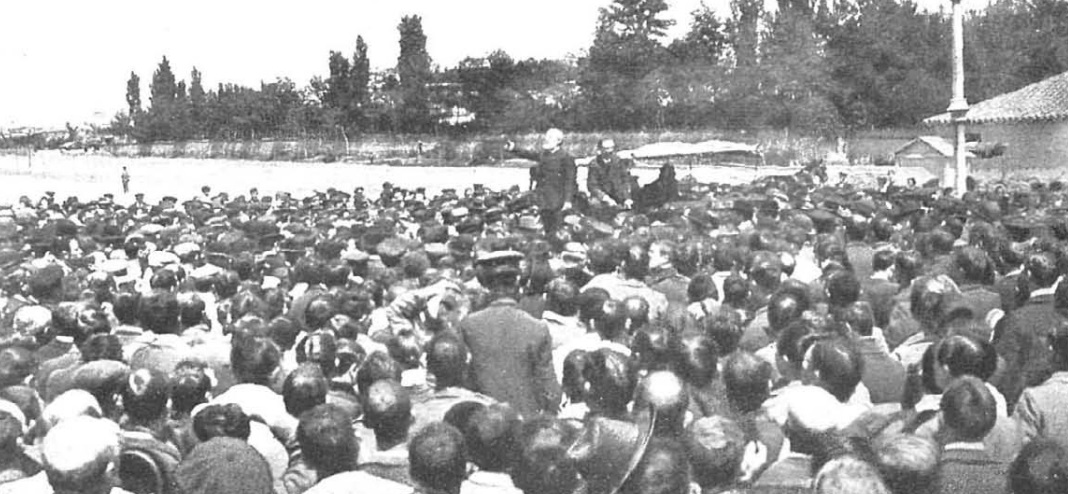
Pablo Iglesias addressing the workers before the dissolution of a demonstration (1905).

Although, theoretically, neither partial nor economic strikes were supported, obviously the member unions of the CNT were immersed in them. If the CNT union, in its rank, had not supported these mobilizations, it would never have been a mass union. It was the class instinct of the class militants which prevailed over the theorizations of "the leadership". Evidently, the assembly and federalist character of the organization allowed each federation of the confederation, at the sectoral or local level, to make the decisions it saw fit.

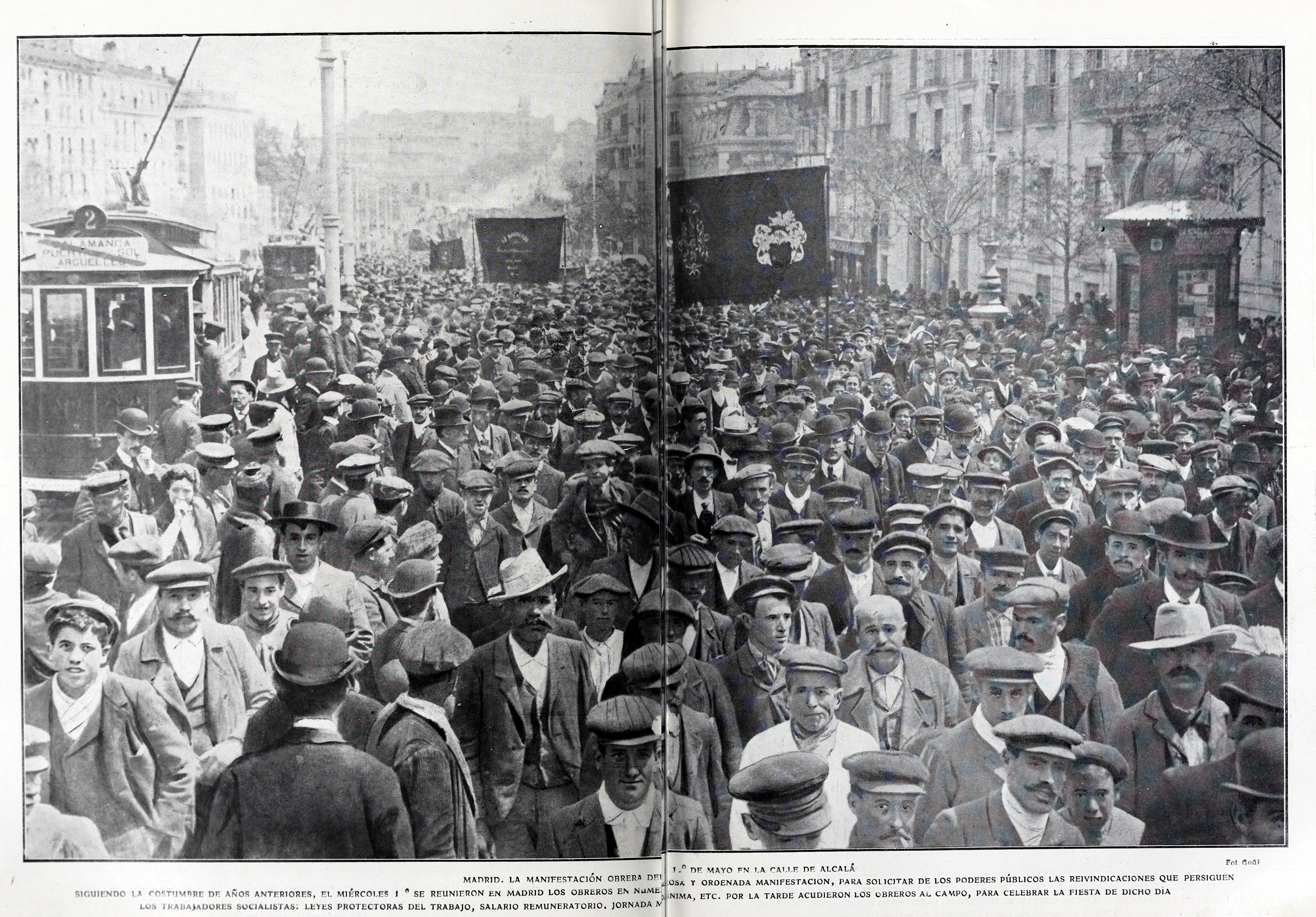
Workers' demonstration on May 1, 1907, on Alcalá Street in Madrid. Photograph by Goñi.

Industrial strikes were spreading through the north, peasant strikes through Andalusia at the end of the 1910s. This was the atmosphere in which the triumph of the Bolshevik revolution in Russia was received. The Spanish working class, like the world working class, was very impressed with the victory of the Soviet Bolshevik revolution. The impact on the PSOE and the UGT is quite well known, leading to the creation of the first Spanish Communist Party; but not so much is insisted on the fact that it produced great sympathy among the confederal milieus, with the CNT becoming affiliated to the III International for a time.

The fact that the Soviet republic functioned in those times through the workers' assemblies or "soviets", allowed the Spanish anarcho-syndicalists to see in it the incarnation of their collectivist ideals. The place where the CNT had most influence, Catalonia, had the most active part of the middle class and the most powerful part of the workers' movement. Bourgeois Catalanism pressed hard, and feared at the same time the strength of the workers.

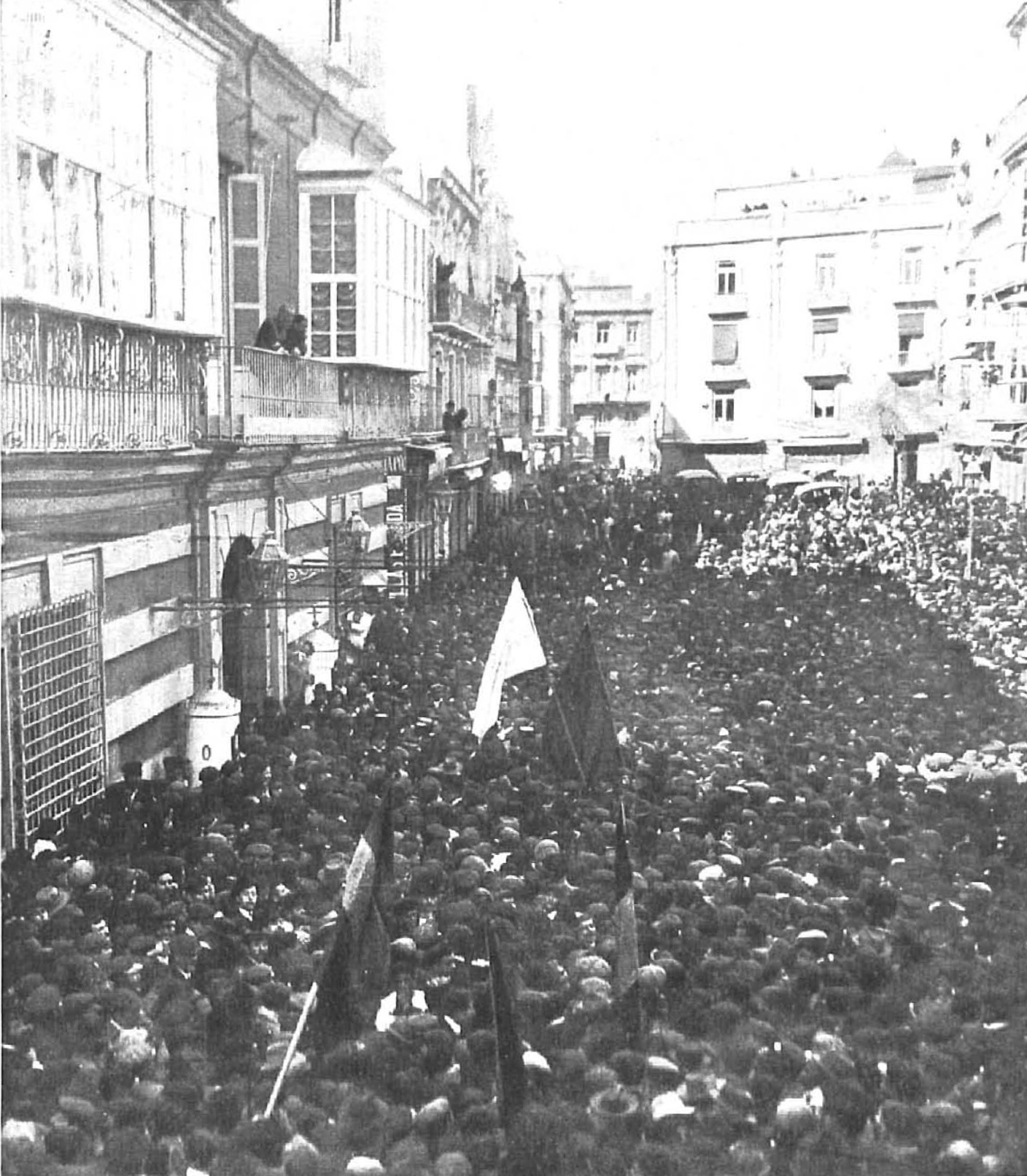
Demonstration of workers at the Cartagena Naval Base (1907).

At the end of the 1910s, the bosses organized throughout Spain against socialism and revolutionary syndicalism. The police were overwhelmed by the workers' movement. Many workers saw individual anarchist terrorism as a provocative maneuver to justify police persecution and repression. The "white" terrorism of the bosses' pistoleros made matters worse.

The growth of the economy of neutral Spain in World War I strengthened the working class and the CNT. In 1917-18 there was an increase in strike activity. The government banned the "Soli" (Solidaridad Obrera, official organ of the confederation), closed workers' centers and arrested leaders. In 1919 there was a strike at the electric company "La Canadenca", which spread and produced a general strike in Catalan industry and the countryside. Partial victory of the CNT, after a hard fight. And the mobilization was important: on March 24, 1919 the CNT again called a general strike to free the prisoners of the previous strike. There were three weeks of social struggle in Barcelona and other cities.

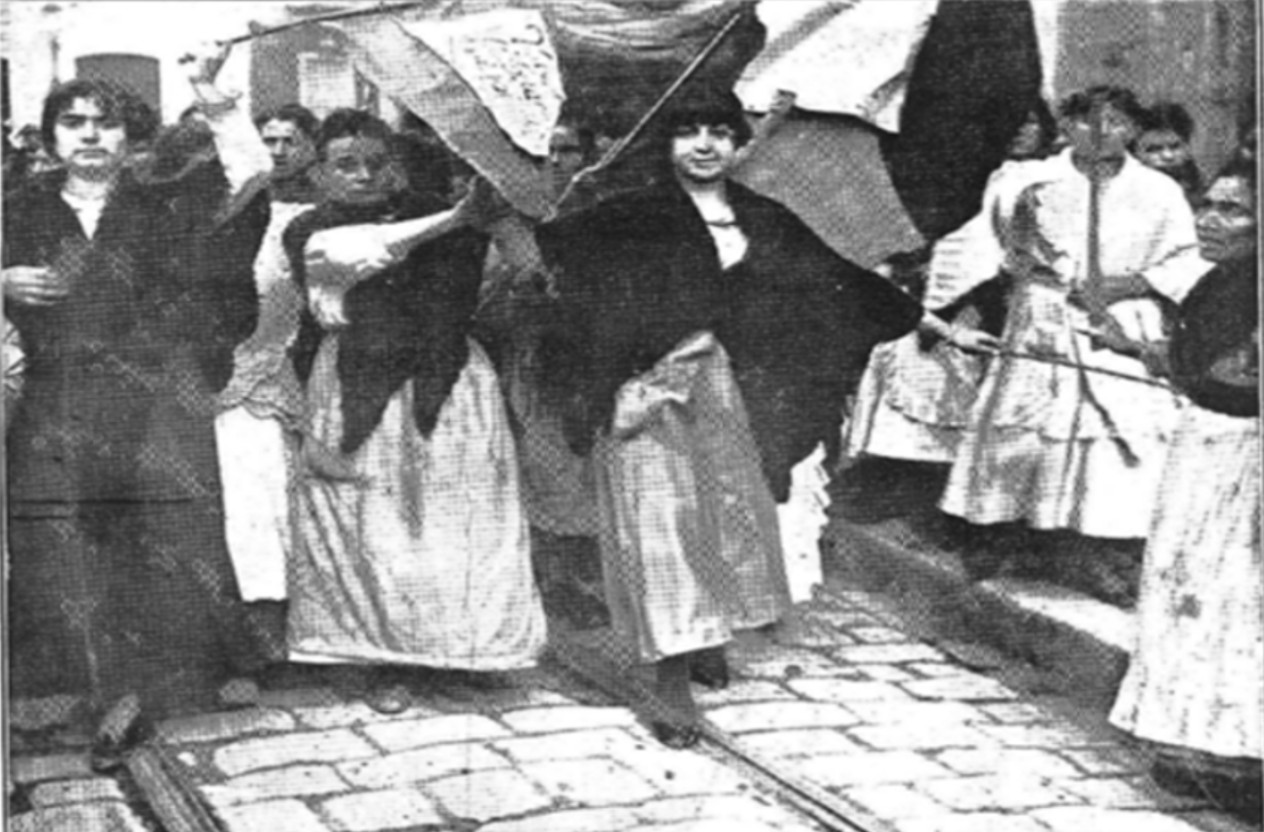
Demonstration of the faeneras in Malaga (1918).

The government reacted with panic and on April 3 the parliament approved the 8-hour working day. The government ordered the formation of mixed negotiation commissions. These were triumphs wrested by the working class with its struggle. But the arrest of trade unionists led to the leadership of the CNT to pure anarchists, who responded to "white" terrorism with actions of individual terrorism. This was criticized by many sectors of the same organization. Former policemen of the "Political-Social Brigade" were in charge of leading the bosses' gangs of pistoleros against the confederals and workers' organizations in general.

At the end of 1919, the government tried to make a pact with the unionist sector of the CNT, but the Federation of Employers raised the "lock-out" and the struggle intensified. The bosses formed declassed workers in the Sindicato Libre (ultra-Catholic and favorable to the bosses) against the single unions of the CNT. The gun fight between the two groups produced a new terrorist escalation. The extension of terrorism in 1920, together with the "lock-outs" and the general strike called for January 24, produced extreme tension.

Terrorism and social struggle spread throughout Spain. Also in 1920, the government passed from the reformist line to the hard line, ceasing to negotiate and repressing the CNT, with the police and the army. The criminal "ley de fugas" was applied, which allowed the murder of detainees alleging attempted escape. There was a spectacular anarcho-syndicalist response, ending with the assassination in Madrid of Prime Minister Eduardo Dato in early 1921 by three anarchist gunmen. The army reacted brutally against the CNT. In 1922 the violence decreased due to the victory of repression.

=== Second Republic and Civil War (1931-1939) ===
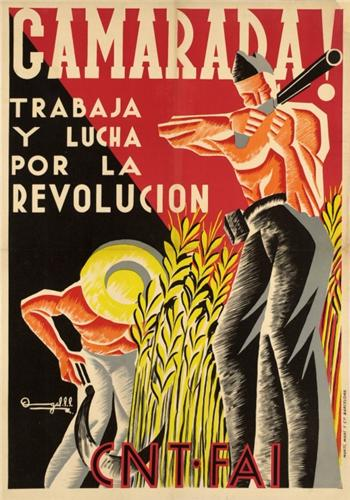
CNT-FAI poster from the Spanish Civil War

During the first two years of the Second Republic, the workers' movement enjoyed a period of relative prosperity, since the authorities were favorable to it, although the economic circumstances were not. It was precisely these circumstances that made the workers impatient, as they did not see all the benefits promised by the Republicans and revolutionary disorders occurred, such as those in Arnedo, Castilblanco and Casas Viejas, which in the long run would harm the workers' movement, as they caused the progressive parties to leave the government.

This situation culminated when, after the electoral triumph of the CEDA in November 1933, the social advances obtained in the previous two years began to be cut back, which gave rise to the revolutionary movement of October 1934 and its harsh repression by the government, especially in Asturias and Catalonia.

The situation in Europe, with the Nazi and Fascist regimes in government in Germany and Italy respectively and increasing their influence in other countries, motivates the decision of the left-wing trade unions to support the electoral coalition of the Popular Front and the return to the government of the republic of the left-wing parties.

== 20th century ==
=== Franco's dictatorship (1939-1975) ===
After the Spanish Civil War and during the Francoist period, all the workers' movements and political parties plunged into exile and clandestinity. Their activities were part of the opposition to Franco's regime.

During this period, the social policy of Francoism annulled the reforms of the Republic, especially the agrarian reform, and also returned properties and factories seized in the Republican zone during the war to their former owners. The bodies of vertical unionism gave a clear advantage at all times to the employers, and the workers would only have a chance to defend their interests in directly elected positions (trade union liaisons, company juries from 1954). The State regulated, through the Ministry of Labor, the conditions to which labor relations had to conform, in which the employers could intervene by adapting the regulations of the industry to the specific characteristics of the enterprise.

There were, however, some important workers' conflicts since the second half of the forties, such as the general strike of May 1, 1947 in Biscay and Gipuzkoa, encouraged by the Basque Government from exile and seconded by both nationalists and leftists, which were harshly repressed.

The rise in prices provoked several labor conflicts: the Barcelona tramway strike of 1951, which spread to several sectors; the general strikes of April of the same year in Biscay and Gipuzkoa, and some other conflicts in Vitoria, Pamplona and Madrid. In addition, there were disturbances in the universities, especially in Madrid in 1956.

In the heat of the social changes and of these mobilizations, together with the generational change that took place at that time, new groups of worker activists arose, linked to Christian base movements, Hermandades Obreras de Acción Católica, HOAC, founded in 1946; the Young Christian Workers, (Juventud Obrera Cristiana, JOC).

The labor conflict was favored by the Collective Bargaining Law of 1958. It strengthened company juries and the role of union liaisons.

Labor mobilization favored the growth of a trade union organization: the Comisiones Obreras (CC.OO.), since 1962. The CC.OO. had emerged as a committee, in order to negotiate collective bargaining agreements on the fringes of trade unionism. Other clandestine unions also emerged, such as the Unión Sindical Obrera (USO), formed in 1960 in Asturias and the Basque Country from nuclei of the JOC; it was joined by the survival of the UGT and the CNT in some areas, and the weaker ELA-STV in the Basque Country. From the beginning of the 70s, some other unions appeared, such as the CSUT or the Sindicato Obreiro Galego (SOG).

=== Reign of Juan Carlos I (1975-2014) ===
1 May in Madrid, 1978

From the rupture of the "unitary syndical current" with CC.OO. will be originated, driven by the Maoists of the PTE and ORT, Sindicato de Obreros del Campo (among its leaders Francisco Casero, Diego Cañamero and Sánchez Gordillo), Sindicato Obreiro da Construcción de Vigo y La Coruña in Galicia (José Luis Muruzabal Arlegui, member of the PTE, will play a central role in the origin of them). In 1976 representatives of these unions, in an assembly in Barcelona, will create the Confederación de Sindicatos Unitarios de Trabajadores which will be chaired by the Madrid letter carrier Jeronimo Lorente. At the same time the ORT will promote the Unitary Union in March 1977. Both trade union centers opposed, to the extent of their strength, the "Pactos de la Moncloa". The CSUT split and dissolved in 1981. The SU, although a minority, still exists.

On April 28, 1977, the democratic period of trade union organizations in Spain began. Enrique de la Mata Gorostizaga, then Minister of Trade Union Relations, opened the door to trade union pluralism with the recognition of UGT, CC.OO., USO, ELA-STV, SOC and CNT.

In the following years they suffered enmities around what were called "trade union models". CC.OO, wanted to capitalize on habits of clandestinity, and UGT, was interested in defending the usual practices and structures of a trade unionism in legality, common to the rest of Europe.

UGT defended a syndicalist logic, while CC.OO. was of a movementist logic. In reality, the communists discovered during the clandestinity that for them a platform, a movement, was infinitely more operative than a union: for this reason they liquidated the one they had, the OSO (Oposición Sindical Obrera, an organization promoted by the PCE (ml) and member of the FRAP never participated in the CC.OO.), and became part of the CC.OO. But now, in legality, the need to make them a union was inevitably imposed on them. This implied time, a change of mentality and, above all, trying to capitalize on the previous inertia in the new measuring system: the trade union elections of 1978.

These ideological struggles not only affected the organizations involved but, as a result, a large part of the USO's militancy joined the UGT in 1977 and the Comisones Obreras in 1980, weakening it considerably. Despite this, it has managed to maintain itself to the point of currently being the third most representative union in Spain.

For its part, the National Confederation of Labor (CNT-AIT), which entered the post-Franco period with a spectacular growth, was involved in internal struggles in which two sectors were distinguished, the first and majority sector in which the sector most faithful to the minimum anarcho-syndicalist approaches was incorporated and another minority sector which opted to participate in union elections and works councils, thus accepting the union model imposed by the State. This confrontation provoked a split within the union, creating what is now known as CGT (Confederación General del Trabajo), a name that had to be adopted by judicial sentence, since this second sector claimed to be the continuation of the CNT. Also significant was the police set-up of the Scala Case, blaming the CNT for what happened, provoking a wave of repression and persecution that frightened a large part of the anarcho-syndicalist militancy. The CNT remains faithful to the principles of struggle with direct action that made it the most important Spanish trade union in the 30s and carrying out the social revolution, now despite its limited social presence, maintains not only its principles and impeccable purposes but preserves its anarcho-syndical structure ready for moments of crisis in which the working class can see the CNT as an alternative.

=== Current majority unions ===
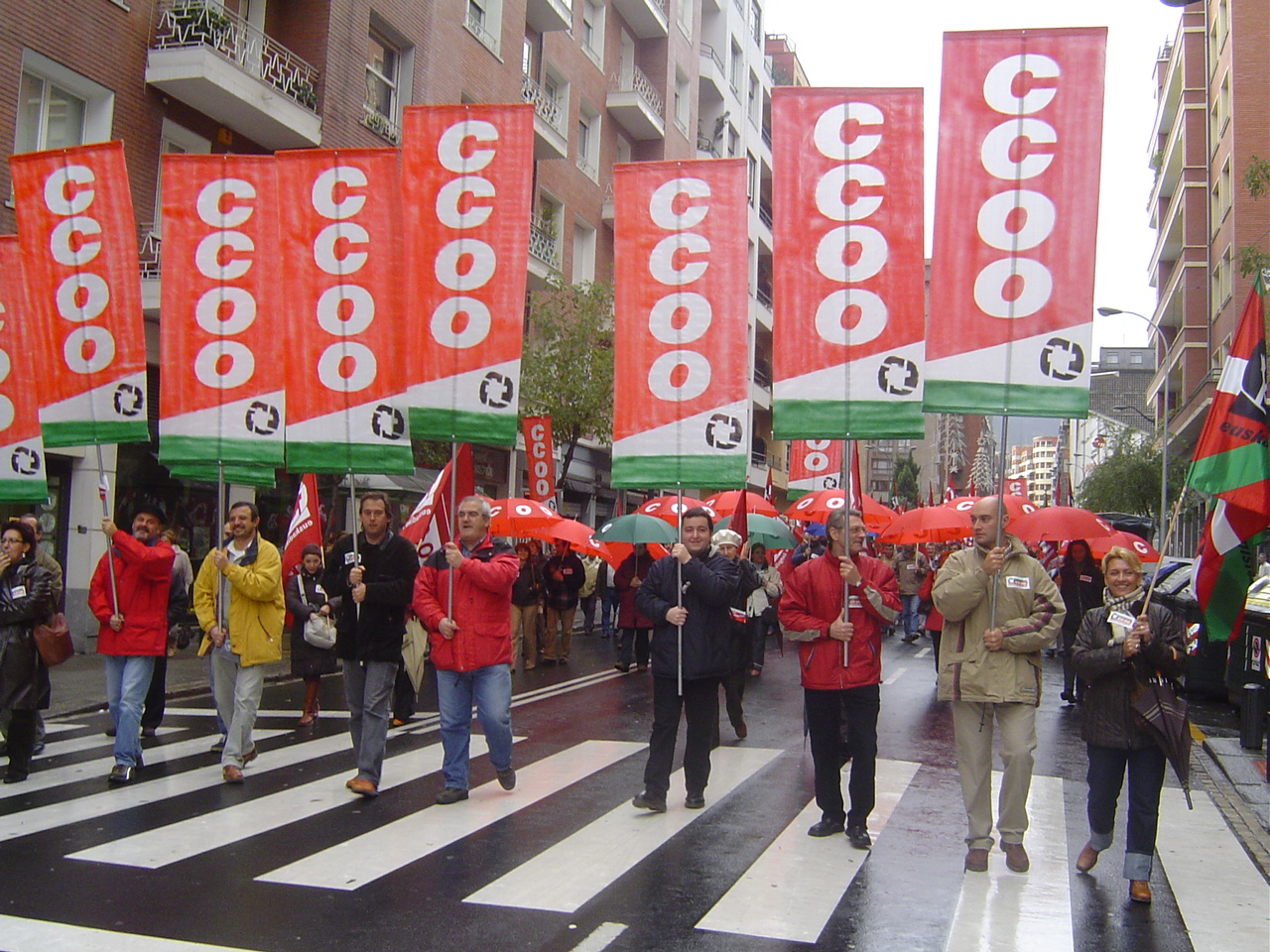
Demonstration of CC. OO. demonstration in Bilbao in November 2004, in defense of the sectoral agreements.

At present, the two unions with the largest electoral representation are the Comisiones Obreras (CC.OO.) and the Unión General de Trabajadores (UGT).

The CC.OO. arose as a result of the Asturian mining strikes of 1962 and 1963 (their first antecedent being the factory commissions of the Basque Country in 1956 and the workers' commission of 1958 in Gijón). Backed by the PCE, they achieved a rapid diffusion and were characterized by fighting, from within, against the vertical unionism of the Central Nacional de Sindicatos. Declared illegal in December 1966, they lost part of their influence during the period of clandestinity, although they once again became the main union after being declared legal in 1977.

In the trade union elections of 1978 they had a higher position than the UGT, a predominance which they lost in the trade union elections of 1986 and later regained. In 1987, Antonio Gutiérrez Vergara replaced their historic leader, Marcelino Camacho, as president. Antonio Gutiérrez gave way to José María Fidalgo, who was secretary general of CC.OO until December 2008, when the current secretary general, Ignacio Fernández Toxo, was elected during the 9th congress of CC.OO.

The UGT experienced spectacular growth during the Second Republic, which it defended in the big cities after the 1936 uprising. It was declared illegal during Franco's regime, so it lost much of its influence and all its assets. After the death of General Francisco Franco in 1975, it regained legality and from 1986 onwards strengthened its leadership within the Spanish trade union movement. It created a trade union action platform with CC.OO. in 1988 to protest, in the opinion of these unions, against the social-liberal policies of the PSOE, calling a general strike throughout Spain on December 14, 1988, with a massively supportive response from the population. In 1992 they called another general strike, this time for half a day, which had less repercussion than the previous one. During the XXXVI Congress of the UGT (1994), Nicolás Redondo, who had been its secretary general since 1976, was replaced by Cándido Méndez.

=== Trade union federations of professional branches with a current strong presence ===
From the 1980s onwards, other trade unions considered to be minorities emerged in Spain, within different professional branches. The most important are:

- AST (Alternativa Sindical de Trabajadores).
- ANPE (Asociación Nacional de Profesionales de Enseñanza).
- STEs (Confederación de Sindicatos de Trabajadores de la Enseñanza).
- STC (Sindicato de Trabajadores de Comunicaciones).
- ACAIP (Agrupación de los Cuerpos de la Administración de Instituciones Penitenciarias).
- CSI-CSIF (Central Sindical Independiente y de Funcionarios).

== See also ==
- Anarchism in Spain
- Anti-austerity movement in Spain

== Bibliography ==
- Tuñón de Lara, Manuel (1977) [1972]. El movimiento obrero en la historia de España. I.1832-1899 (in Spanish) (2nd ed.). Barcelona: Laia. ISBN 84-7222-331-0.
