= Valencia Conference =

- Emblem of the FRE-AIT
- Native name: Conferencia de Valencia
- Date: 10–18 September 1871
- Duration: 8 days
- Location: València
- Type: Conference
- Cause: Events surrounding the Paris Commune; Repression by the government of Francisco Serrano
- Motive: The election of a new Federal Council
- Organised by: Spanish Regional Federation of the International Workingmen's Association
- Outcome: Anarchist resolutions adopted; Federation restructured along provincial lines; New council elected; Next congress organised; International delegate selected

The Valencia Conference was a secret meeting of the delegates of the Spanish Regional Federation of the International Workingmen's Association (FRE-AIT) held in Valencia in September 1871, during the reign of Amadeo I. It was held in secret due to the persecution it suffered in consequence of the panic caused by the Paris Commune among the European governments and ruling classes.

== Background ==
In March 1871, the Paris Commune broke out, causing a "psychosis of terror not only in the conservative and right-wing media, but also in most of the bourgeois media" throughout Europe. In Spain, one of the first authorities to react was the civil governor of Barcelona, who prohibited strikes and workers' meetings and ordered an attack on the premises of "Las Tres Clases del Vapor" and arrested its main leader, which led to the fact that on 22 May several Catalan federal republican deputies presented a protest in the Cortes. They were answered by the Interior Minister Práxedes Mateo Sagasta who said that the internationalists were foreigners "whose mission is to disturb order and proselytize" —in reality they were "communard" refugees fleeing from the repression that followed the defeat of the Commune.

Six days later, on 28 May 1871, Sagasta sent a circular to the civil governors in which he granted them broad powers to act against the International. Faced with this situation on 3 June the Federal Council of the FRE-AIT decided to leave Madrid and settle in Lisbon. There went Anselmo Lorenzo, Tomás González Morago and Francisco Mora Méndez, while Ángel Mora stayed in Madrid. From Lisbon, the Council contacted the local federations, pointing out the difficulties that existed in convening an ordinary congress of the FRE-AIT, which was where the new Federal Council was elected, so they asked them to arbitrate some system to renew it. As they received no response, González Morago resigned, while Mora and Lorenzo decided to remain in their positions, although formally resigned, and to convene a secret conference to be held in Valencia on 10 September, in which the new Council would be elected.

After the fall at the end of July 1871 of the government of Francisco Serrano, in which Sagasta was the Minister of the Interior, and his replacement by another chaired by Manuel Ruiz Zorrilla, who was more tolerant towards the activities of the International, the Federal Council decided to return to Madrid - although González Morago preferred to remain in Lisbon.

== Development ==
Between 10 and 18 September 1871, the Conference was held in Valencia "in an atmosphere of semi-secrecy." In attendance were 13 delegates representing 3,000 contributors and 2,000 passive members. At that time the FRE-AIT had 12 local Federations, with 45 sections of office.

At the Conference, a typically Bakuninist resolution was adopted: “That the true federal democratic republic is collective property, anarchy and the economic federation, that is, the free universal federation of free agricultural and industrial workers' associations.

On the other hand, the question of the integration of the peasants in the FRE was addressed for the first time, agreeing to the creation of the Union of Rural Workers, which held its first congress a few months later. The budget on which its creation was based was the assimilation of the tenant, and even the small owner, to that of the day laborer, a point of view defended, for example, by Francesc Tomàs Oliver.

The "regional" division of the Spanish Regional Federation was also approved:

| Region | Province | | | | | | | | | | | |
|---|---|---|---|---|---|---|---|---|---|---|---|---|
| NORTH (Note: The present autonomous communities of Nafarroa, Euskadi, Cantabria, Asturies and Galicia respectively.) | Nafarroa | Gipuzkoa | Araba | Bizkaia | Cantabria | Asturies | Lugo | A Coruña | Pontevedra | Ourense | | |
| SOUTH (Note: The present autonomous communities of Murcia, Andalucía and the Canarias respectively.) | Murcia | Albacete | Almería | Granada | Málaga | Jaén | Córdoba | Sevilla | Cádiz | Huelva | Canarias | |
| EAST (Note: The present autonomous communities of Aragón, Catalunya, Valencia and the Illes Balears respectively.) | Uesca | Zaragoza | Teruel | Lleida | Girona | Barcelona | Tarragona | Castelló | València | Alacant | Illes Balears | |
| WEST (Note: The present autonomous community of Estremaúra and the historical region of Llión respectively.) | Badajoz | Cáceres | Salamanca | Zamora | Llión | | | | | | | |
| CENTER (Note: The historical regions of Old Castile and New Castile respectively.) | Burgos | Valladolid | La Rioja | Palencia | Soria | Segovia | Guadalajara | Ávila | Madrid | Toledo | Ciudad Real | Cuenca |

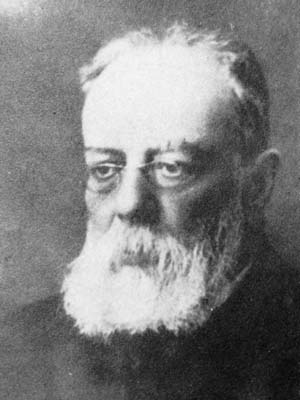
Anselmo Lorenzo, the FRE-AIT delegate to the International Conference in London.

A new Council was elected made up of Francisco Mora Méndez (shoemaker), Ángel Mora (owner of a small carpentry), Valentín Sáenz (bookkeeper), Inocente Calleja (owner of a silver shop), Hipólito Pauly (printer), José Mesa (director of La Emancipación), Anselmo Lorenzo (printer), Pablo Iglesias (printer) and Víctor Pagés (unknown trade worker). It was also agreed that the headquarters of the next Congress would be Zaragoza and that Anselmo Lorenzo would represent the FRE at the International Conference to be held in London. At the proposal of Francisco Mora, the new members were admitted to the Bakuninist "International Alliance of Socialist Democracy", formally dissolved but which continued to exist in Spain.

Lorenzo brought with him the "Proposal that the Conference of delegates of the local Federations of the Spanish Region, verified in Valencia on 10 September 1871, presents to the International Conference of London", which consisted of a "project of social organisation of the working classes" that reproduced the model of the Spanish Federation: the formation of sections of office for each locality that together constitute the local Federation, which together with the rest of the local Federations constitute the "Regional Federation with a regional federal Council, appointed in a Congress of representatives of all the local Federations". "All the regional Federations constitute the International Federation with a general Council, appointed in Congress of representatives of all the regional Federations." This structure aimed at "war on the exploiters" and "social liquidation" in the "new society" would constitute "the emancipation of labour, the solidarity of workers and the establishment of the exchange of products with products."

However, at the London Conference the Bakuninist theses defended by the FRE were defeated and the previously approved Marxist theses were ratified: the "constitution of the proletariat into a political party is essential to ensure the triumph of the social revolution and of its supreme aspiration: the abolition of social classes"; "The action of the working class, its economic movement and its political action are inextricably linked." The dissolution of Mikhail Bakunin's International Alliance of Socialist Democracy was also ratified.

Although on his return to Spain Lorenzo did not explain the differences that existed within the International between anarchists and Marxists, the discrepancies were known. Thus, after the London conference, a part of the Madrid section, made up of the editors of the newspaper La Emancipación, began to adopt the Marxist thesis and publish articles in which it "skilfully" defended them, such as that which it published on 27 November 1871, in which it said: "We never said that the International should abstract from all political ideas, but that the working class should have its policy, corresponding to its own interests." In the same month of November, Francisco Mora Méndez, one of the members of the La Emancipación group, began to correspond with Friedrich Engels.

== Bibliography ==
- Avilés Farré, Juan (2013). La daga y la dinamita. Los anarquistas y el nacimiento del terrorismo (in Spanish). Barcelona: Tusquets Editores. ISBN 978-84-8383-753-5.
- Lida, Clara E. (1973). Antecedentes y desarrollo del movimiento obrero español (1835-1888). Textos y documentos (in Spanish). Madrid: Siglo XXI. ISBN 84-323-0098-5.
- Termes, Josep (1977). Anarquismo y sindicalismo en España. La Primera Internacional (1864-1881) (in Spanish). Barcelona: Crítica. ISBN 84-7423-023-3.
- Termes, Josep (2011). Historia del anarquismo en España (1870-1980) (in Spanish). Barcelona: RBA. ISBN 978-84-9006-017-9.
- Tuñón de Lara, Manuel (1977) [1972]. El movimiento obrero en la historia de España. I.1832-1899 (in Spanish) (2 ed.). Barcelona: Laia. ISBN 84-7222-331-0.
