= Zaragoza Congress =

- Emblem of the FRE-AIT
- Native name: Congreso de Zaragoza
- Date: 4–8 April 1872
- Duration: 4 days
- Venue: Salón Novedades
- Location: Zaragoza, Aragon, Spain
- Also known as: Second Congress of the FRE-AIT
- Type: Congress
- Cause: Expulsion of Marxists from the Madrid Federation
- Motive: Annulment of the expulsion
- Organised by: Spanish Regional Federation of the International Workingmen's Association
- Outcome: Expulsion of the Marxists annulled; Anarchist thesis adopted; New council elected

The Zaragoza Congress was the Second Congress of the Spanish Regional Federation of the International Workingmen's Association (FRE-AIT). It was held in Zaragoza in April 1872, at the end of the reign of Amadeo I. To prevent it from being suspended by the government, as it ended up happening, the delegates met secretly a few days before the scheduled date. Previously, the Valencia Conference, had also been held in semi-underground conditions. The Congress, among other matters, dealt with the conflict that arose in the Madrid Federation between the anarchists, the majority, and the Marxists, the minority.

== Background ==
In December 1871 Paul Lafargue and his wife Laura Marx - along with their young son who would die the following year - settled in Madrid, after having entered Spain in August fleeing the repression of the Paris Commune. The Marxist thesis that both defended - Laura was the daughter of Karl Marx - found support among the group linked to the newspaper La Emancipación formed by José Mesa, Francisco Mora Méndez and Pablo Iglesias and they began to disseminate them in the articles published in the newspaper. The Madrid Federation, where the anarchists had the majority, approved the expulsion of the group but the Federal Council annulled the decision until the Congress met, which at the Valencia Conference of September 1871 had decided that it would be held in Zaragoza.

== Development ==
The Zaragoza Congress officially opened its sessions on 8 April 1872 in the Novedades room, but in reality it had begun clandestinely four days earlier, on 4 April, in anticipation of it being banned by the Government, which ended up happening. One of the Congress secretaries, before those gathered by order of the civil governor left the premises, read a protest note signed by all the delegates "on behalf of all the associated workers from Spain, and on the face of the world" for the "brutal and scandalous outrage of which they have been victims". "Our Congress had reason as its criterion, the realisation of justice as its objective, peace and tranquillity as a rule ... It was natural, then, that our attitude frightened the men of the bourgeoisie, as the criminal frightens the voice of your conscience. But this very fright has lost them. They have broken hostilities with the working class. Until now they have limited themselves to insulting and threatening us in their speeches and in their circulars; today they loudly proclaim, with an illegal and violent act, that the children of work cannot be reunited peacefully. The note ended like this: 'Down with privileges! Down with the exploitation of man by man! Down with tyranny! Long live the International Workingmen's Association!" The city workers went on strike to support the protest and the Congress ended its sessions at the Federation's premises in Zaragoza.

This is how the events of the Congress were explained:

Anticipating that the holding of Congress could be prevented due to the arbitrariness of the local authorities, the Federal Council summoned the delegates for the 4th instead of the 7th that was appointed. In effect, the Congress met on the 4th at the premises of the Zaragoza Federation and it was agreed to hold public sessions from the 7th, but not having been able to find a place, it was left for the 8th in the Novedades room. After complying with what the law imposes, posters were posted summoning the workers from Zaragoza. The governor sent an official letter declaring that the public session could not be held, on the grounds that the International is an "association contrary to the laws because it goes against social foundations: the State, religion, property and the family." Congress agreed to reject the governor's refusal and to meet publicly in the designated place, and in the case of dissolution by that authority, to launch an energetic protest. This was done. On 8 April, at two in the afternoon, the Congress met in the Novedades room, before an immense crowd that filled the premises, the president appointed for this session delivered the opening speech, presenting the work to be done and declared open the second Labour Congress of the Spanish Regional Federation of the International Workingmen's Association. Immediately the dependents of the authority to dissolve the Congress appeared and after taking note of their names one of the secretaries read the following
"Protest of the delegates in the regional Congress of Zaragoza"
[…] The reading of this protest elicited unanimous exclamations of enthusiasm from the audience, made up of the majority of the local workers.
The Congress agreed to continue its sessions at the premises of the Zaragoza Federation until the 11th when finished his tasks.

In addition to seven members of the Federal Council, 38 delegates attended (44, according to Josep Termes) from the 50 local federations - of which the Catalans were the strongest, followed by the Valencians, Malagueños and Gaditanos - constituted with 41 sections of various and 187 ex officio - it was reported that there were 52 federations in the process of formation with a total of 97 ex officio sections and 28 various others. Among the trade unions were "The Three Classes of Steam" —converted the following month into a "Manufacturing Union" with 28,000 members—, the Union of Building Constructors, the Union of Dyers, the Union of Tanners, the Union of Shoe Builders and the Union of Agricultural Workers. The delegates' jobs were as follows: 11 from the textile industry, 5 typographers (among them, José Mesa, Anselmo Lorenzo and Pablo Iglesias), 5 shoemakers, 3 bricklayers, 2 tanners, 2 coopers, 2 silversmiths, 2 smelters, a fitter, a machinist, a blacksmith, a locksmith, a barber, a science teacher, a doctor (Paul Lafargue), a farm worker (the delegate from Carmona), an engraver, a cabinetmaker, a carver, a chocolatier and a hatter.

Several topics were discussed, although some of them, such as the opinion on property drafted by Anselmo Lorenzo and inspired by Paul Lafargue —who attended the Congress as a representative of Alcalá de Henares and under the pseudonym Pablo Farga - and by Laura Marx, were postponed until the following Congress. As for the conflict that arose in the Madrid Federation with the editorial office of the newspaper La Emancipación, the expulsion was annulled. It was thus agreed "that the editors of La Emancipación withdraw everything that has given rise to their expulsion and that the Madrid Federation also withdraw everything that is offensive to said editors and the expulsion agreement." However, as Anselmo Lorenzo recalled years later, "the reconciliation was only a postponement of hatred."

The Bakuninist theses triumphed and thus, for example, "complete conformity" was declared with the resolutions of the Belgian Federation, one of which said that "the International is and has always been a group of autonomous Federations; that the General Council is not and has never been but a Center for correspondence, data and reviews".

There was an intense debate on the question "What is meant by worker?", An important issue in determining who could belong to the International and who could not, but no conclusion was reached. The purest anarchists defined the workers not by their social "position" but by their ideas and behaviours, so that only "revolutionary" individuals, whether they were workers or not, should be admitted, and "reactionary workers" should be left out - a delegate said that a worker was "anyone who does useful work for humanity, not being contrary to justice and morals". The proposal, postponed at the 1870 Barcelona Workers' Congress, to carry out a union action to achieve a reduction in working hours was also discussed, but it was rejected on the grounds:

that the ideal of reducing from eight to ten hours the maximum of the daily work of all arts and crafts and trying to find the best possible means of establishing equality in wages, are restricted ideals before the great object that our Association proposes itself, that is, abolition of wage labour and classes and establishing economic equality between the individuals of both sexes.

There was a "recognition of the defenders of the Paris Commune, who suffer on the pontoons and in exile the consequences of their love for the cause of the emancipation of the proletariat, their own time that a fond memory to the victims caused by the barbarians of Versailles". And it was also about the "emancipation of women from all work that is not domestic", remembering the following:

It is also affirmed that the woman is a free and intelligent being, and therefore, responsible for her acts, the same as the man;
That to guarantee her this freedom and put her in a condition to practice it no choice but work. The opposite is to subject it to the narrowness of the domestic home and the tyranny of man,
Therefore:
The tendency of the internationals should be to make it enter the labour movement, so that it contributes to the common work, the emancipation of the proletariat; because just as in the present social organisation there is no sex difference in the face of exploitation, neither should there be any in justice.

A new Council was elected whose members were all members of Mikhail Bakunin's International Alliance of Socialist Democracy: Francisco Tomás (bricklayer), Anselmo Lorenzo (printer), Peregrín Montoro (silk weaver), Francisco Martínez (dyer) and Francisco Mora Méndez, who were joined by the Valencians Vicente Rosell (silk weaver), Vicente Torres (bookseller), Vicente Asesni (cabinetmaker) and Cayetano Martí (stonemason), since they decided to move the headquarters of the Council from Madrid to Valencia. In this way it was tried to avoid the resumption of the confrontation between anarchists and Marxists that would have been inevitable if it had installed in Madrid or Barcelona.

== Bibliography ==
- Lida, Clara E. (1973). Antecedentes y desarrollo del movimiento obrero español (1835-1888). Textos y documentos (in Spanish). Madrid: Siglo XXI. ISBN 84-323-0098-5.
- Termes, Josep (1977). Anarquismo y sindicalismo en España. La Primera Internacional (1864-1881) (in Spanish). Barcelona: Crítica. ISBN 84-7423-023-3.
- Tuñón de Lara, Manuel (1977) [1972]. El movimiento obrero en la historia de España. I.1832-1899 (in Spanish) (2 ed.). Barcelona: Laia. ISBN 84-7222-331-0.
