= 1870 Barcelona Workers' Congress =

Congress that founded anarchism in Spain

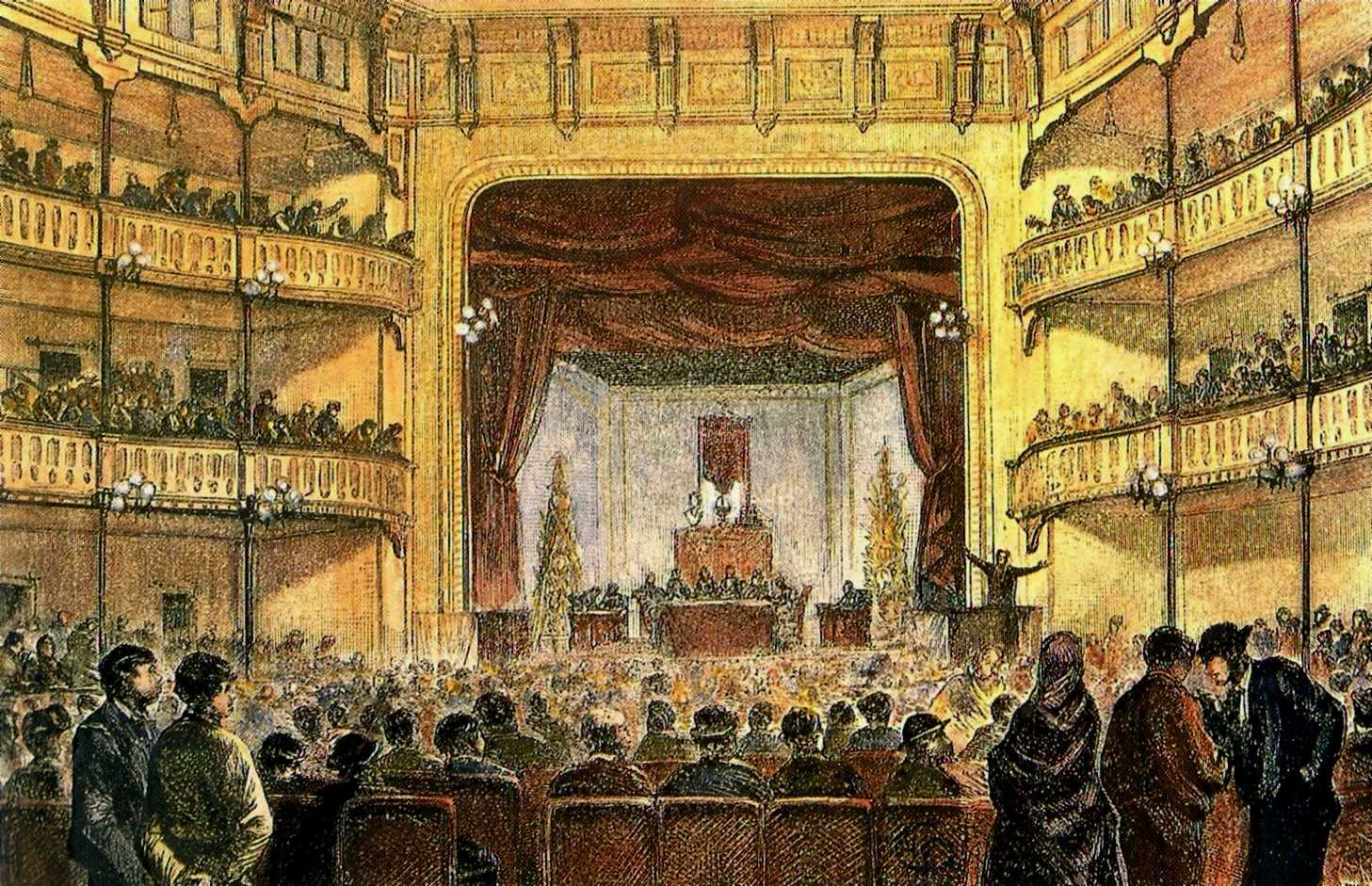
- An engraving of the Workers' Congress of 1870 that was held at the Teatro Circo in Barcelona.
- Native name: Congreso Obrero de Barcelona de 1870
- Date: 18–26 June 1870
- Venue: Teatro Circo
- Location: Barcelona
- Also known as: First Spanish Workers' Congress
- Type: Congress
- Motive: The organization of Spanish workers
- Outcome: Foundation of the Spanish Regional Federation of the International Workingmen's Association

The 1870 Barcelona Workers' Congress (officially: First Spanish Workers' Congress) was a congress that brought together, from 18 to 26 June 1870, 89 delegates from workers' societies in Barcelona and in which the Spanish Regional Federation of the International Workingmen's Association (FRE-AIT) was founded. It is considered the founding act of anarchism in Spain.

== Background ==
The Revolution of September 1868 opened a period of freedom in which workers' societies were able to emerge from the secrecy in which they had lived for most of the reign of Isabella II. In October the Provisional Government decreed freedom of association and that same month the Central Directorate of the Workers' Societies was founded in Barcelona, into which those that had subsisted during the clandestinity and other new ones that had survived were integrated. In December 1868 the Central Directorate held a Workers' Congress in which they were represented 61 societies. Among its leaders were men who would later become prominent figures of the FRE-AIT: Rafael Farga and Antonio Marsal Anglora, appointed secretaries of the organisation; and Juan Nuet, Jaime Balasch, Clement Bové and Juan Fargas.

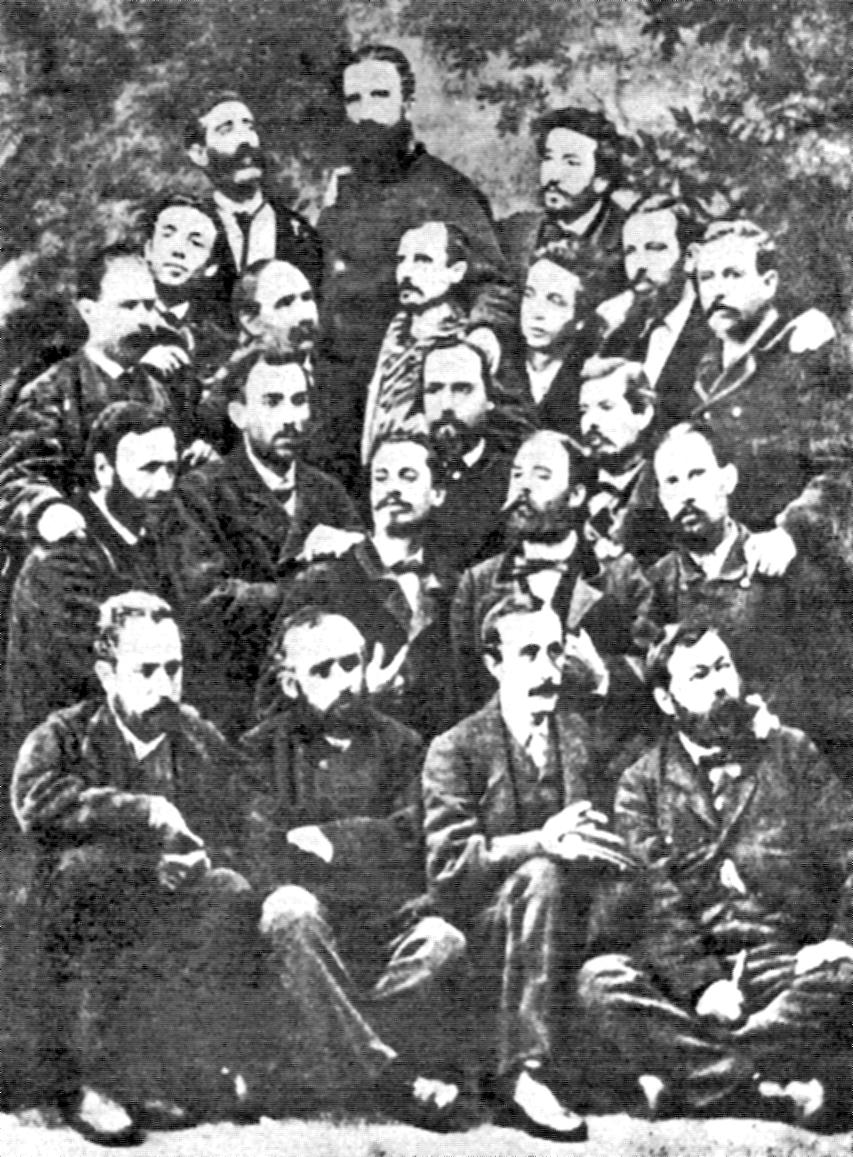
Group of founders of the International Workingmen's Association, in Madrid, in November 1868. Giuseppe Fanelli appears in the center, at the top, with a long beard.

Although the AIT founded in London in 1864 was already known in Barcelona, direct contact with it came through the Italian Giuseppe Fanelli, sent by Mikhail Bakunin, who arrived in Barcelona at the end of October 1868 where he met with the leaders of the Central Directorate. After passing through Tarragona, Tortosa and Valencia, accompanied by Élie Reclus, Arístides Rey, Fernando Garrido and José María Orense, Fanelli went to Madrid where he arrived on 4 November. There he held a first meeting at the home of the lithographer Julián Rubao Donadeu with the group of workers who frequented the cultural group "Fomento de las Artes". From there the initial nucleus of the International emerged in Madrid, made up of twenty-one people: five construction painters, four typographers —one of them Anselmo Lorenzo -, two tailors, two engravers —one of them Tomás González Morago -, two shoemakers, a carpenter, a gilder, a lithographer, a rope maker, a horseman and a journalist. The group was formed on 24 January 1869 but it would not officially become the Madrid section of the AIT until December of that year.

Fanelli provided them with official documents from the International but also from the International Alliance of Socialist Democracy, the secret anarchist organization created in September 1868 by Bakunin. In December the Alliance had seen its request for membership in the AIT denied but Fanelli was unaware of it when he formed the International group, of which eight of its members also joined the Alliance, without being aware that what it was advocating was contrary to what was approved by the International, influenced by the ideas of Karl Marx. While the International had agreed at its 2nd Congress "that the social emancipation of the workers is inseparable from their political emancipation" and "that the establishment of political freedoms is a principal measure of absolute necessity", the Alliance rejected "all revolutionary action that does not have as an immediate and direct objective the triumph of the cause of the workers against capital" and advocated the disappearance of the State, replaced by the "universal union of free associations."

At the beginning of 1869 Fanelli arrived in Barcelona where he gathered a group of more than twenty workers in the workshop of the painter José Luis Pellicer, uncle of the typographer Rafael Farga, general secretary of the Federal Center for Workers' Societies and of the Catalan Athenaeum of the Working Class. The group became a Barcelona section of the AIT in May 1869, seven months before the Madrid section. In both cases with the same confusion between the International and the Alliance, as if they were the same thing. "Thus, the first Spanish affiliates to the AIT believed that the program of the Bakuninist secret society (suppression of the State, rejection of parliamentary politics, abolition of social classes and collectivisation of property) coincided with the principles of the First International". This "combination sui generis of Alliance principles and the International" would mark a particular course for anarchist socialism in Spain, providing it with an ideological amalgam that, strictly speaking, was not that of the International Workers' Association. In addition, these first groups were endowed with a double organizational level: one public and the other secret.

However, the majority of the corporate movement continued to support federal republicanism, although the failure of the insurrection of September and October 1869, as well as the failure to fulfil the promises of the Provisional Government to suppress consumption and Fifths, the "anti-political" sentiment grew, which led the internationalists to intensify their propaganda campaign against the Republican Party and against workers' participation in the elections. The harsh police repression that was unleashed on the occasion of the "mutiny against the fifths" in Barcelona in April 1870 also helped to spread their proposals of antipoliticism at the first Spanish labour congress, which took place in Barcelona in June of that year.

== Call ==
In January 1870, the Madrid group, which already had 23 office sections, brought out the newspaper La Solidaridad, whose writing staff included Vicente López, Hipólito Pauly, Máximo Ambau, Juan Alcázar, Anselmo Lorenzo, Francisco Mora and Tomás González Morago. In its 12 February issue, La Solidaridad proposed holding a workers 'congress in Madrid on the first Sunday of the month of May - which it invited to attend "all the workers' societies, constituted or in project, adhered or not to the International, but that are in accordance with its general statutes", but the Barcelona section claimed that the capital had few workers' societies, and the newspaper La Federación proposed that federal centres be consulted, organising a vote in which affiliates from 26 towns throughout Spain participated. Barcelona won, which obtained 10,030 votes, while Madrid obtained 3,370, with far behind: Zaragoza (694 votes), Valencia (648), Reus (20) and Alcázar de San Juan (8). Thus, it was decided that the Congress would be held in Barcelona instead of Madrid because most of the 149 workers' societies that had taken the initiative - and that had 15,216 associates— were Catalan.

The scheduled date of the first Sunday in May was postponed due to the declaration of the state of siege in Barcelona due to the "mutiny of the fifths" that had broken out that spring.

At the beginning of June, a few days before the start of the Congress, the Madrid Section approved the following resolution, clearly Bakuninist: "it is advised that the International completely separate itself from everything that could have a bourgeois political character".

== Development ==
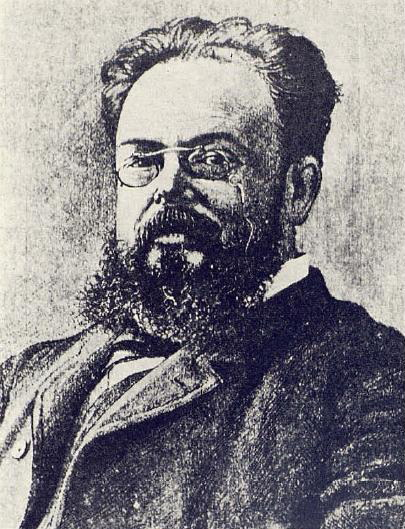
Rafael Farga, one of the promoters of the Congress and the first president of the sessions

The congress began its sessions on 18 June 1870, according to Josep Termes, or on 19 June, according to Manuel Tuñón de Lara, at the Teatro Circo in Barcelona. 89 delegates attended, 74 from Catalan workers' societies -33 from the textile sector and the rest from pre-industrial trades such as tailors, shoemakers or bricklayers-, who would represent 15,000 members. In addition to the Catalans, there were delegations from the Balearic Islands, Valencia, Alcoy, Cartagena, Málaga, Arahal, Jerez de la Frontera, Cádiz, Ezcaray, Valladolid, etc. On many occasions the representation of societies outside Catalonia was held by members of the Federal Center of Barcelona - Farga Pellicer himself represented the Center of Cartagena and the tailors, bakers and painters of Cádiz. The presidency was initially held by Farga Pellicer but he handed it over to André Bastelica, a French refugee who a year later would participate in the Paris Commune. The first two days were dedicated to the delegations presenting the situation of their organizations and workers in their localities. According to one of the attendees later, during those first two sessions:

many delegates took the floor to give an account of the moral and material state of the working class in their respective localities, the whole presenting a heartbreaking picture of the mistreatment, penalties and miseries under which the class was overwhelmed worker. This was a tremendous accusation leveled against bourgeois society by the victims of its iniquitous exploitation.

From the first session, the congress appeared attached to the International Workingmen's Association. This was stated by Farga Pellicer in the opening speech: "you come here to affirm the great work of the International Workers' Association ... which contains in itself the complete emancipation of the proletariat ... [and] under whose banner they are already sheltering of three million workers, white slaves and black slaves." At the end of the Congress Francisco Tomás Oliver spoke to those gathered as "delegates of the Spanish sections of the International Workingmen's Association."

Three currents were represented in Congress: the Bakuninists which was antipolitical, anti-state, collectivist and only relatively favourable to the development of the workers' societies; the trade unionists, subdivided into an "apolitical" and a "political" trend, the latter in favour of continuing to participate in the federal republican movement; and the cooperativists, little interested in the declaration of strikes.

Four major issues were discussed in the Congress. The first was union action - "the resistance" - on which the need to create workers' societies and to declare vindictive strikes - at this point the Bakuninists accepted the postulates of the trade unionists and thus easily defeated the cooperative sector - although the latter were not considered an end in themselves but a means to advance towards the social revolution and thus achieve "The complete emancipation of the working classes" carried out by themselves. With this agreement, approved by 47 votes to 2 and 23 abstentions, "the resistance ceased to be an attitude of socio-professional type, to become socio-political, although the expression "politics" was so repugnant to those men". "A new type of union action was imposed, the "solidarity resistance", which meant overcoming the old "societarism" in which each workers' society was solely responsible for its own strikes, which it had to finance with its own funds." This was explained by one of the drafters of the opinion, the Bakuninist Anselmo Lorenzo:

So it is not about organising resistance societies that only have relationships between the individuals that make up society, it is about bringing together the same interests between the different societies that can be founded in a locality In other words, it is about organising the resistance by associating all the workers...

The second topic was cooperatives. At this point the cooperatives were defeated again, since only the existence of the consumer cooperatives was accepted, but not the production cooperatives. Thus, "cooperation was subordinated to the initiation of the workers and to the propaganda for the repeated general emancipation". As has been pointed out Josep Termes, "Cooperativism as a formula for social emancipation suffered, at the Barcelona congress, a severe blow for which it was not compensated." The Bakuninist Tomás said:

I think it has been said that cooperation was a direct means to reach the complete and radical emancipation of the working class, with which I am not satisfied ... I believe that so that the workers can reach their full and radical emancipation it is necessary to make a Social Revolution.

The third great subject treated in the Congress was that of the social organisation of the workers. It was agreed that the base would be constituted by local trade unions, which in turn would federate with those of the same branch of other towns. The resulting federation would be the one that would direct the protest actions. Likewise, the trade unions of the same locality would be grouped to form a local workers' federation, which in turn would join the rest of the local federations to constitute the Regional Federation, which would be integrated into the International Workingmen's Association (AIT), whose objective "is to reach the social revolution as soon as possible to achieve the economic and social emancipation of the workers." "The strict anarchists considered that these local and regional federations were the embryos of the future management bodies of the municipalities and the country, and that they foreshadowed the instruments of government that were to be implemented when the State and private property were abolished and collective property would have been established". The cooperative members presented an alternative reformist opinion calling for the formation of mixed juries, cooperatives, workers' credit unions and the intervention of the State to tackle the social question, but it was defeated. An Andalusian Bakuninist answered them:

What brothers! Do you want to join the state when we propose its destruction? ... It seems to me not, because you say in your writing, that in this way we will obtain our emancipation. But do you hope that the state will succumb to give us life? [...] All the concessions that we have taken from the state have been truncated; they have been temporary flatteries to contain our most radical aspirations that have to ask for their annihilation ... He has given us, I say, universal suffrage and he is, according to the writing that I fight is clear, the powerful weapon that is wielded by we will give us victory. And what is universal suffrage? A sarcasm for the worker, as long as there is no social equality.

Considering:
That the aspirations of the peoples towards their well-being, based on the preservation of the state, have not only failed to be realized, but this power has been the cause of their death.
That authority and privileges are the strongest columns on which this slave society relies ...
That any participation of the working class in the government policy of the middle class could not produce other results than the consolidation of the order of things which is said to paralyze the revolutionary socialist action of the proletariat.
Congress recommends that all sections of the International Workingmen's Association renounce any corporate action that has the objective of carrying out social transformation through national political reforms and invites them to expand all their activity in the federative constitution of the official bodies, the only way to ensure the success of the social revolution. — Opinion on the policy approved in Congress.

The fourth and last topic was undoubtedly the most controversial and to which the most time was devoted. It was about determining the attitude to be maintained towards politics. The Bakuninists - who had prepared the proposals in previous secret meetings of the Alliance - tried to convince the "political" union delegates and cooperativists of the virtues of "anti-politicalism" but they continued to defend the Federal Republic. In the end, a somewhat ambiguous agreement was reached in which "antipoliticism (that is, global and systematic opposition to political parties, elections and parliaments) was not clearly defined, but rather apoliticalism that, by recommending to the Workers' societies that renounce politics, as collectives, did not impede the political action of their members if they were considered individually. The agreement was actually the result of the acceptance by the Bakuninists of the "apoliticism" of the trade unionists who defended that politics should be left out of the internal debate of the workers' societies, in order to group all the workers that they had regardless of ideas, and it meant the defeat of the "political" syndicalists favourable to federal republicanism. Thus, as Josep Termes has pointed out, "the Barcelona Congress did not exactly produce the victory of Bakuninist antipoliticism, but rather that of a coalition of anarchists and apolitical syndicalists".

The minority that spoke out against the ruling and defended political participation used arguments such as the following:

To successively achieve protection from the state, I believe that we workers must take part in the elections of the municipalities, in the elections of the provincial councils, and even more so in those of deputies to the Cortes, electing workers or people who by their ideas they are known protectors of the working class; because it is clear, citizens, that if the capitalists and the privileged make the laws, they will always make them in their favour, while if the workers took part in the formation of these laws, they would certainly make them in our favour. This is why I believe that workers should take a more active part in these elections.

The federal republican newspaper La Campana de Gràcia described the delegates who voted in favour of apoliticism as "imbeciles or traitors to the cause of the worker."

Francesc Tomàs Oliver thus valued this point in his Historical notes on the birth of anarcho-collectivist ideas in Spain published in La Revista Social between 1883 and 1885:

The Barcelona Congress... was the first where the anarcho-collectivist ideas were proclaimed by some 50 of the 85 delegates who took part in its deliberations. [...] A part of the delegates who voted with the majority understood that as a society, as a corporation, they should not engage in bourgeois or parliamentary politics, but as individuals they could join any of the political parties. This false interpretation led to many of the internationalists at critical moments being more friends with the bourgeois parties than with that association. [...] When this was held, the federalists exercised a lot of influence and, for some delegates like the Bochons and the Nuet to vote the opinion on the attitude of the International in relation to politics, it was necessary to delete from the preamble the phrases most combative against the Federal Party.

A Federal Council made up of members of the Madrid section was elected because it was decided to locate its headquarters there. This is how Anselmo Lorenzo, Tomás González Morago, Enrique Borrel, Francisco Mora and Ángel Mora were elected. According to Josep Termes, the fact that the council was not based in Barcelona, as would have been the logical thing to do since it was "the stronghold of workers", possibly due to the fact that most of the delegates from Catalan societies - some 40 out of a total of 74 - had not supported the "apolitical" radical line approved in Congress. This is what would also explain why the following congresses were not held in Barcelona or Catalonia, but in Zaragoza, Córdoba and Madrid, "cities that at that time were hardly relevant in terms of the labor movement".

After having decided to hold the next one in Valencia, the congress closed on Saturday 25 June, with a series of events being held the following day, Sunday. At eight o'clock in the morning a parade began with the AIT banner in front, which bore the phrase "No more rights without duties, no more duties without rights", followed by a rally attended by some 10,000 workers that Farga Pellicer closed alluding to "the great work of the International" since "only the Social Revolution could achieve our social emancipation."

Shortly afterwards these verses circulated calling on the workers to join the AIT:

The hour of justice sounds, the symbol of radical reform;
our shield by currency, let it be the International.
We will have our shadow sheltered by peace, attention:
that we are going to found, brothers, and our Emancipation.

== Consequences ==
Not all the workers' societies existing in Spain at the time — some 195 that had about 25,000 members — were integrated into the Spanish Regional Federation of the IWA. Its membership ranged from a minimum of 1,764 in April 1871 to 15,000 in August 1872, making it one of the most important regional federations of the International. The local federations — 13 and 33 in the process of being established — were very unequal in terms of the number of members — the Barcelona one reached 6,000 members, while the Madrid one never exceeded 200.

== Bibliography ==
- Lida, Clara E. (1973). Antecedentes y desarrollo del movimiento obrero español (1835-1888). Textos y documentos (in Spanish). Madrid: Siglo XXI. ISBN 84-323-0098-5.
- Lida, Clara E. (2010). "La Primera Internacional en España, entre la organización pública y la clandestinidad". In Julián Casanova (ed.). Tierra y Libertad. Cien años de anarquismo en España (in Spanish). Barcelona: Crítica. ISBN 978-84-9892-119-9.
- Termes, Josep (1977). Anarquismo y sindicalismo en España. La Primera Internacional (1864-1881) (in Spanish). Barcelona: Crítica. ISBN 84-7423-023-3.
- Termes, Josep (2011). Historia del anarquismo en España (1870-1980) (in Spanish). Barcelona: RBA. ISBN 978-84-9006-017-9.
- Tuñón de Lara, Manuel (1977) [1972]. El movimiento obrero en la historia de España. I.1832-1899 (in Spanish) (2ª ed.). Barcelona: Laia. ISBN 84-7222-331-0.
