= International Alliance of Socialist Democracy =

- Alliance Internationale de la Démocratie Socialiste
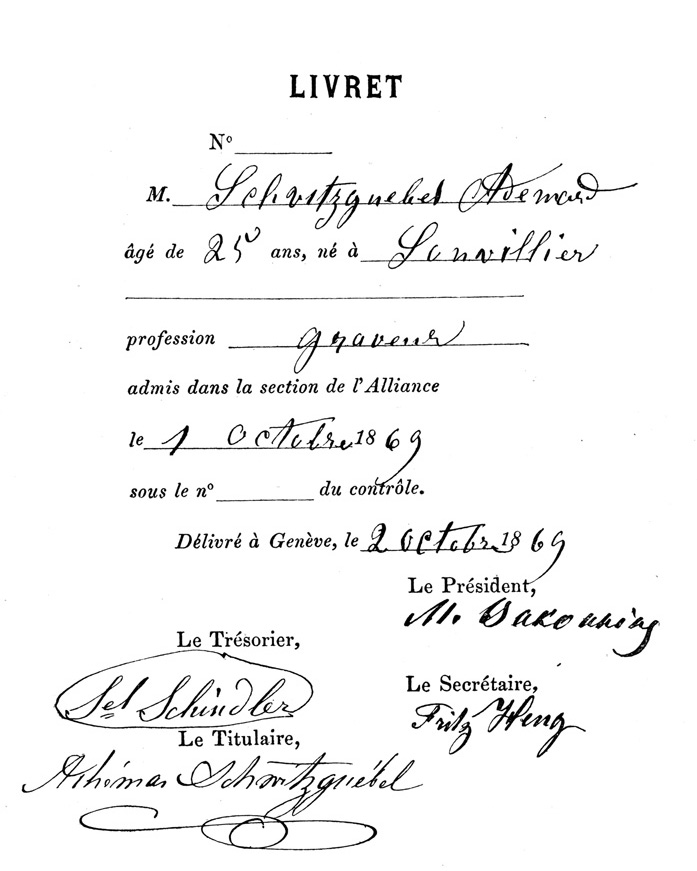
- The Alliance membership document
- Abbreviation: AIDS
- Merged into: International Workingmen's Association
- Successor: Anarchist International
- Formation: 28 October 1868; 158 years ago
- Dissolved: De jure: April 1869; 157 years ago De facto: September 1871; 155 years ago
- Type: Political international
- Purpose: Revolutionary socialism Collectivist anarchism
- Headquarters: Geneva
- President: Mikhail Bakunin

The International Alliance of Socialist Democracy (French: Alliance Internationale de la Démocratie Socialiste; AIDS) was an organisation founded by Mikhail Bakunin along with 79 other members on 28 October 1868, as an organisation within the International Workingmen's Association (IWA). The establishment of the Alliance as a section of the IWA was not accepted by the general council of the IWA because, according to the IWA statutes, international organisations were not allowed to join because the IWA already fulfilled the role of an international organisation. The Alliance dissolved shortly afterwards and the former members instead joined their respective national sections of the IWA.

== History ==
=== The Alliance and the International: Anarchists versus Marxists ===
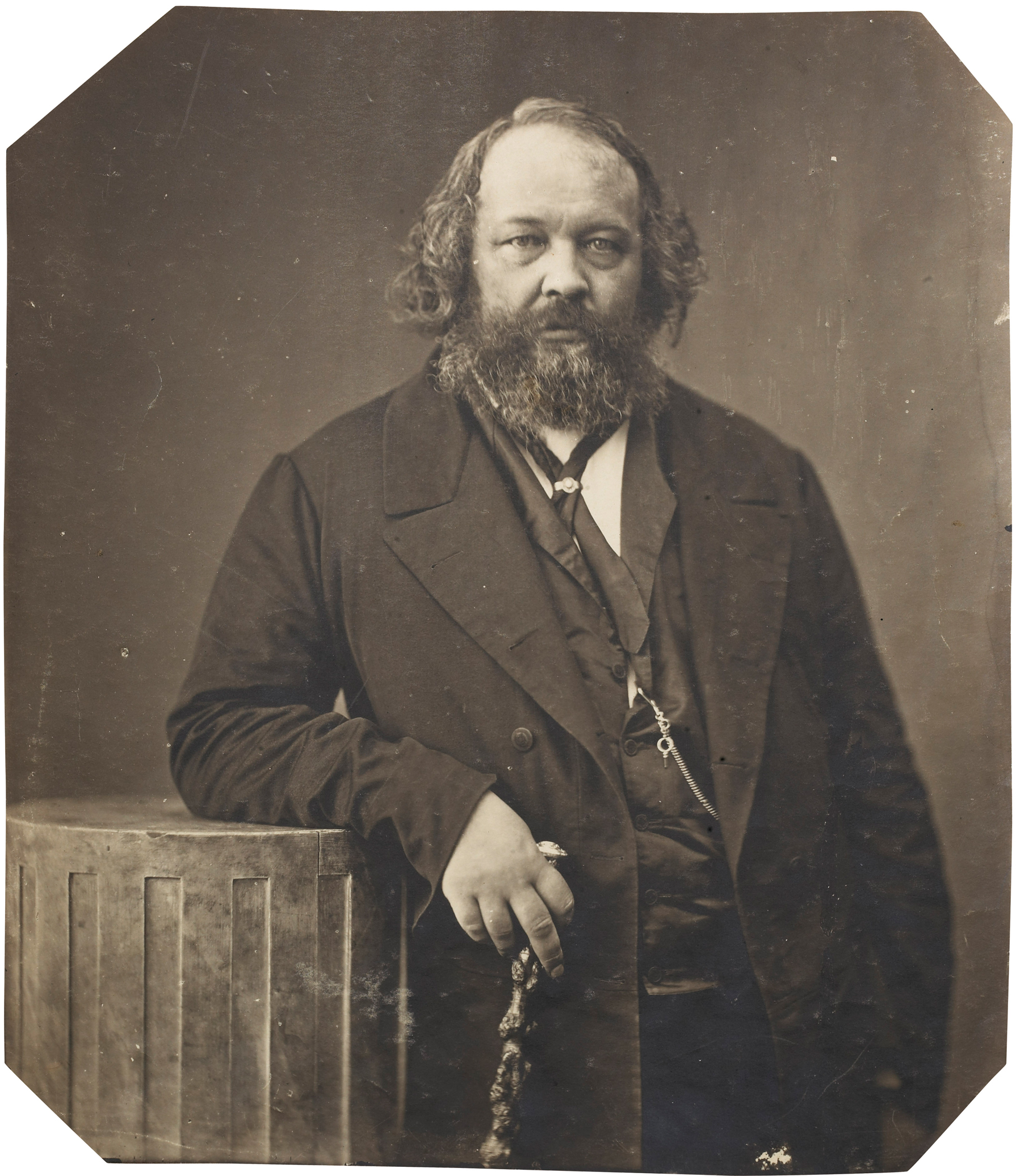
The Russian anarchist Mikhail Bakunin, founder of the International Alliance of Socialist Democracy and chief theoretician of collectivist anarchism.

In 1867, Mikhail Bakunin settled in Geneva and there he founded the Alliance of Socialist Democracy, in which other Russian exiles as well as Polish, French, Italian and other exiles were integrated. The Alliance counted on the collaboration of the Jura Federation – created in November 1871 and directed by James Guillaume and Adhémar Schwitzguébel – in which he succeeded in advancing his "apolitical" theses, contrary to participation in elections and in "bourgeois" institutions. Supporters of political intervention, following the theses approved at the proposal of Karl Marx at the Congresses of the International Workingmen's Association (IWA), formed the Geneva Federation.

The Alliance requested membership in the IWA, but the General Council replied that its statutes did not allow it as it was an international organisation; thus, the Alliance agreed to be formally dissolved in April 1869, passing its members from Geneva to join the Jura Federation. The rest of the Alliance groups did the same, although the Spanish Regional Federation headed by Rafael Farga Pellicer and Gaspar Sentiñón founded a secret group in Barcelona around April 1870 which they called the Alliance of Socialist Democracy, endowed with a program and regulations that were the same as those of the Geneva Alliance. According to the historian Josep Termes: "surely, this Alliance was born in order to achieve – through this coherent and secret group – that the Barcelona Workers' Congress, which would be held two months later, would come out decisively for collectivist anarchism and apoliticism, putting an end to the predominance of the societal, cooperative and politicist currents". After the Barcelona Congress, Alliance groups were formed in other locations, especially when the Spanish Government began to take measures against the International because of the "panic" caused by the Paris Commune.

To avoid being condemned at the IWA Conference that was to be held in London in mid-September 1871, the Geneva Alliance decided to dissolve the previous month against opinion Bakunin himself, who was absent when the decision was made. Neither the Jura Federation nor representatives from Germany or Italy attended the London conference, held between 17 and 23 September. Anselmo Lorenzo attended as delegate of the Spanish Regional Federation. There, a resolution was approved that supported the Marxist "politicist" thesis of the need for a workers' party to be constituted in each country. Likewise, the decision to dissolve the Alliance was ratified. The response of the anarchists led by the Jura Federation was to hold a congress on 12 November in Sonvilier in which it was agreed to reject what was approved by the London Conference and to send a circular to all regional federations – the so-called Sonvilier Circular – in which the convocation of a new Congress was requested. The Belgian Federation supported the proposal to draft new statutes of the IWA, in which the powers of the General Council would be curtailed.

Following the example of the Geneva Alliance, the Spanish Alliance decided to formally dissolve itself days before the Zaragoza Congress of the FRE-AIT was held in April 1872. However, as Josep Termes has pointed out, the group continued to function as such even though the bureaucratic organisation had disappeared, "since it was impossible for ideological and personal ties to stop influencing its conduct. In practice, there was no difference between the actions of the Bakuninist group after the dissolution or before it."

=== The break between Anarchists and Marxists ===
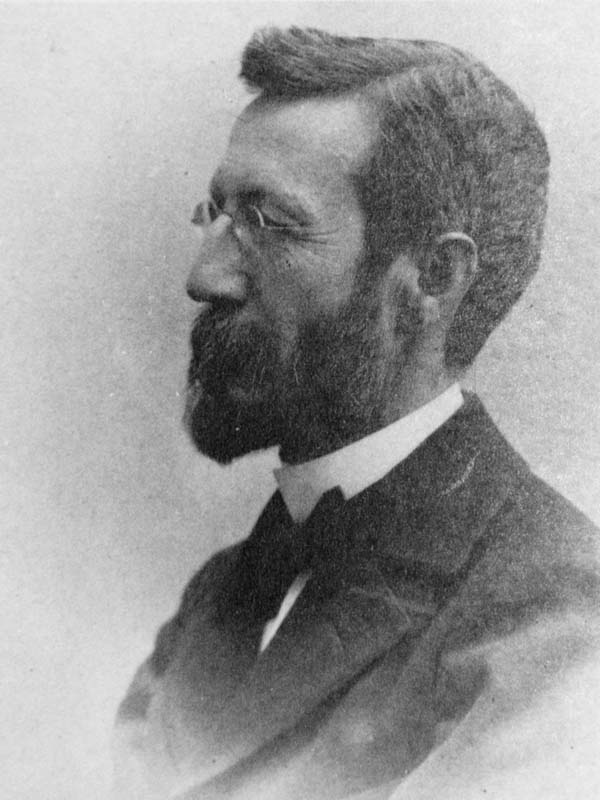
The Swiss anarchist James Guillaume, leader of the Jura Federation and one of the founders of the Saint-Imier International.

The Marxists were convinced that the International Alliance continued to exist, and the evidence they believed to be found in the writings and conduct of Bakunin himself, who had not resigned himself to the dissolution of the organisation. In fact, Bakunin was convinced that it had not disappeared and wrote so in some letters that would later be used by the General Council as "evidence" against him during the IWA's Hague Congress. On 5 April 1872, he wrote to the Spanish Alliance member Francisco Mora Méndez: "You know without a doubt that in Italy, the International and our beloved Alliance have acquired a great development ...". Furthermore, Bakunin was also convinced that the supporters of the General Council were active in a secret party: the Communist League, founded in 1847 – although it had been dissolved in 1852.

On 24 July 1872, shortly after the Marxists of the Spanish Regional Federation were expelled from the organisation, Friedrich Engels wrote on behalf of the General Council to the FRE Council asking for their names, activities and positions held by the members of the Alliance, adding that, if the Spanish Council did not respond, the General Council would denounce its members "for violating the spirit and the letter of the General Statutes and traitors to the International [...] for the benefit of a secret society not only alien to it, but hostile." The Federal Council did not give the names, claiming that it was only accountable to the FRE Congresses. In addition, the Barcelona Alliance group assured that its Alliance should not "be confused with the Alliance of Socialist Democracy, a public section of Geneva, which had members in several countries, since the Alliance that we founded in Spain did not have anything in common with that one but the conformity of ideas."

Between 2 and 7 September 1872, the Hague Congress was held in which the final break between Marxists and Anarchists took place. Most of the delegates supported the Marxist theses approved in previous congresses, such as those relating to "the constitution of the proletariat into a political party" and the connection between the economic struggle and the political struggle. And, in addition, they agreed to the expulsion of Mikhail Bakunin and of his Swiss ally James Guillaume for not having dissolved the Alliance. The delegates in favour of the "anti-authoritarian" positions signed a manifesto showing their disagreement with the expulsion and decided to meet in Saint-Imier, to hold a separate congress in which the expulsion of Bakunin and Guillaume was annulled, did not recognise the General Council appointed in The Hague and approved a resolution that included the anarchist theses, insisting that "the destruction of all political power is the first duty of the proletariat" and that "all allegedly provisional and revolutionary political power [... ] cannot be more than a hoax." It was also agreed that the regional federations would interact with each other outside the General Council, thereby de facto separating themselves from the IWA. Thus arose the Anarchist St. Imier International, with which the anarchist split from the International Workingmen's Association was consummated.

== Program and strategy ==
The Alliance program, written by Bakunin, read as follows:

[The Alliance] wants above all political, economic, and social equalisation of classes and individuals of both sexes, commencing with abolition of the right of inheritance, so that in future enjoyment be equal to each persons's production, and so that, in conformity with the decision taken at the last workers' congress in Brussels, the land, instruments of labor, like all other capital, on becoming collective property of the entire society, shall be used only by the workers, that is, by agricultural and individual associations. [...] Being the foe of all despotism, not recognising any political form other than republican and rejecting completely any reactionary alliance, it also rejects any political action which does not have as its immediate and direct aim the triumph of the workers' cause against capital. [...] It recognises that all the existing political and authoritarian states, more and more reducing their activities to simple administrative functions of public service in their respective countries, will have to dissolve into a universal union of free associations, like the agricultural and industrial ones. [...] Since the Social question can only have a final and real solution on the basis of international or universal solidarity of the workers of all countries, the Alliance rejects any policy based on self-styled patriotism and on rivalry between nations.

In a letter he wrote to the Spanish Alliance member Tomás González Morago when the Alliance was formally dissolved, Bakunin explained the organisation's strategy:

[The International] has the mission of bringing together the working masses, millions of workers [...]; the other, the Alliance, has the mission of giving these masses a truly revolutionary leadership [...] Furthermore, as we know that the organisation of popular power cannot be done by theoretical propaganda alone, but rather demands the alliance and organisation of the characters and revolutionary wills constituted in a kind of revolutionary general staff, we have formed our secret Alliance within the International itself [...] The public International is excellent [...] to agitate, to revolutionise the masses, but which alone is incapable to organise popular power [...] and that is why a secret organisation is necessary. [...] The last London conference has pronounced anathema against any secret society that wants to form within the International. It is obviously a blow against us.

== See also ==
- Virginie Barbet

== Bibliography ==
- Leier, Mark (2006). Bakunin: The Creative Passion. Seven Stories Press. ISBN 978-1-58322-894-4.
- McClellan, Woodford (1979). Revolutionary exiles : the Russians in the First International and the Paris Commune. Cass. ISBN 0-203-98802-7. OCLC 243606265 – via Google Books.
- Termes, Josep (1977). Anarquismo y sindicalismo en España. La Primera Internacional (1864–1881) (in Spanish). Barcelona: Crítica. ISBN 84-7423-023-3.
- Termes, Josep (2011). Historia del anarquismo en España (1870-1980) (in Spanish). Barcelona: RBA. ISBN 978-84-9006-017-9.
- Tuñón de Lara, Manuel (1977) [1972]. El movimiento obrero en la historia de España. I. 1832–1899 (in Spanish) (2 ed.). Barcelona: Laia. ISBN 84-7222-331-0.
