= Spanish Regional Federation of the IWA =

Spanish workers' organization

Spanish Regional Federation of the International Workingmen's Association
- Federación Regional Española de la Asociación Internacional de Trabajadores
- Original logo of the FRE-AIT
- Abbreviation: FRE-AIT
- Successor: Federation of Workers of the Spanish Region (FTRE)
- Formation: June 1870
- Founder: Francisco Mora Méndez; Enrique Borrel; Anselmo Lorenzo; Tomás González Morago
- Founded at: Teatro Circo, Barcelona
- Dissolved: September 1881
- Location: Spain
- Parent organization: International Workingmen's Association

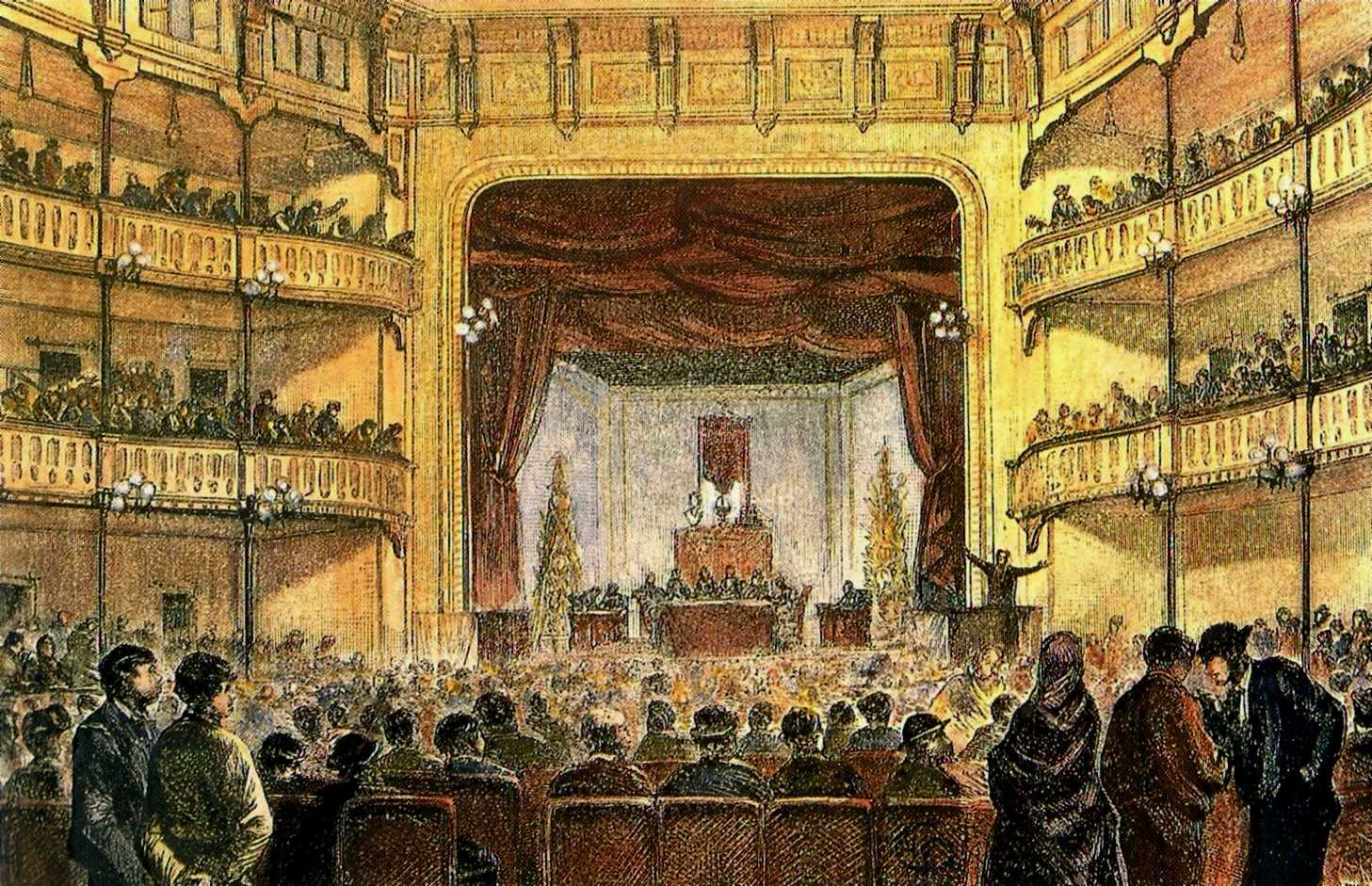
Engraving of the Barcelona Workers' Congress of 1870

The Spanish Regional Federation of the International Workingmen's Association (Spanish: Federación Regional Española de la Asociación Internacional de Trabajadores), known by its Spanish abbreviation FRE-AIT, was the Spanish chapter of the socialist working class organization commonly known today as the First International. The FRE-AIT was active between 1870 and 1881 and was influential not only in the labour movement of Spain, but also in the emerging global anarchist school of thought.

Through association with a significant number of trade unions in Spain, the Spanish Regional Federation quickly grew to become one of the largest national chapters of the IWA with upwards of 29,000 members by 1873. Distribution of IWA membership was not homogeneous throughout Spain, however, with the local Barcelona section of FRE-AIT reaching 6,000 members compared to the Madrid section never exceeding 200 members.

The FRE-AIT is considered a predecessor of the present-day CNT which was founded in 1910.

== History ==
=== Formation ===
The Glorious Revolution of 1868 overthrew the Bourbon Queen Isabella II and initiated the Sexenio Democrático period of Spanish history where liberal and radical theories were spread openly for the first time in decades. The Barcelona Workers' Congress held in June 1870 provided the first opportunity for representatives from the emerging Spanish working class to organize publicly. Eighty-nine delegates attended the Barcelona Congress where attendees voted to join the International Workingmen's Association which had been founded six years earlier in London with the aim of uniting workers and trade unions globally. Delegates at the Barcelona Congress were not united in how best to achieve the IWA's class struggle aims, and the newly formed FRE-AIT developed factions along the lines of Bakuninist collectivist anarchism, syndicalism, and cooperativism.

=== Suppression and division ===
At the onset of the Paris Commune in March 1871, reactionary fear of a working class uprising spread through the upper and middle classes. Strikes and union meetings were banned in Barcelona in an effort to thwart any attempt of a similar revolt in the region. After the fall of the Paris Commune, many communards fled to Spain as refugees which further stoked liberal and conservative fears of a socialist working class uprising. The Spanish government curtailed FRE-AIT activities and in June 1871 the organization's federal council left Spain for exile in Portugal. In the Spanish Cortes, the IWA was portrayed as a criminal organization by Minister of the Interior Práxedes Mateo Sagasta. The fallout from the Paris Commune furthered the divide between the working and middle classes in Spain.

After the fall of the Serrano government in July 1871, the incoming government led by Manuel Ruiz Zorrilla was more friendly towards the International and the FRE-AIT federal council moved back to Spain. In September 1871, the FRE-AIT held the Valencia Conference where the organization passed more Bakuninist resolutions putting it in conflict with the International's resolutions which were leaning more Marxist. The smaller Madrid section of the FRE-AIT, however, maintained a more orthodox Marxist approach and would harbour Karl Marx's daughter and son-in-law, Laura Marx and Paul Lafargue, as exiles in late 1871 in the aftermath of the Paris Commune.

On November 10, 1871, the Spanish Cortes passed a motion prohibiting the FRE-AIT from organizing. This prohibition, though not always enforced, forced the FRE-AIT to operate clandestinely leading into 1872. The next FRE-AIT congress held in Zaragoza in April 1872 saw further division between the Marxists and the Bakuninists, with the latter continuing to dominate the organization. Finally, by June 1872, members of Marxist faction within the FRE-AIT associated with Lafargue were expelled. The expelled Marxist members centered in Madrid formed the New Madrid Federation in July 1872 that was officially recognized by the International but only managed to gain a couple hundred members compared to the remainder of the FRE-AIT's membership of 15,000 at the time.

At the September 1872 Hague Congress of the International, the organization's Bakuninist wings were themselves expelled and the FRE-AIT joined the anarchist successor of the IWA split, known as the St. Imier International, in January 1873. In recognition of FRE-AIT's now strictly anti-authoritarian stance, the organization's federal council was dissolved a new council was established in the working class industrial city of Alcoy.

=== First Spanish Republic ===
With King Amadeo's abdication in February 1873, the First Spanish Republic was proclaimed. While many factions of the FRE-AIT were weary of participating in electoralism, the organization welcomed Spain's transition to republicanism and campaigned heavily for workers' rights in the lead-up to the May 1873 general election. After left-leaning Francesc Pi i Margall's electoral victory, the FRE-AIT organized demonstrations in Barcelona and other cities to demand improved workers' rights and a more decentralized federal state. While Pi was receptive to these ideas, the government's response was seen as too slow by FRE-AIT and radicals as the Spanish Cortes hoped to achieve a Spanish federation through the drafting of a new Spanish Constitution. In July 1873, the FRE-AIT attempted to organize a worker's uprising in Alcoy known as the Petroleum Revolution, but this uprising was suppressed after 4 days and the FRE-AIT moved its operations back to Madrid from Alcoy. At the same time, a general strike was held in Barcelona with support from the FRE-AIT.

More radical anarchist supporters, known as "intransigents", did not recognize any state-sponsored federation and began organizing independent cantons to self-associate during the cantonal rebellions that lasted until 1874.

=== Underground and radicalization ===
In January 1874, the Spanish government was dissolved in a coup led by General Pavía that brought forth another reactionary conservative era. On January 10, the FRE-AIT was again prohibited and its offices were occupied by the government. The FRE-AIT moved underground and began organizing materials and meetings secretly. The organization managed to maintain its ties with the St. Imier International and the FRE-AIT even sent delegates to the International's 1875 Congress in Brussels.

After moving underground, the FRE-AIT moved from Madrid to Barcelona and leaned more towards insurrectionist policies in an attempt to overthrow the restored Bourbon monarchy. By 1876, the FRE-AIT began advocating for propaganda of the deed which put it at odds with the St. Amier International. In 1877, a new rift began forming in the FRE-AIT between the anarcho-collectivist and anarcho-communist wings, led by followers of Bakunin and followers of Kropotkin respectively. While the FRE-AIT overall maintained a Bakunist collectivist approach, the Andalusian section organized itself along more anarcho-commnunist lines.

=== Dissolution ===
In 1881, freedom of association was guaranteed by the new federal government led by Sagasta. With splintering ideologies and rampant radicalization within the FRE-AIT, the organization was dissolved at the Barcelona Workers' Congress of 1881 and replaced by the more moderate anarcho-syndicalist Federation of Workers of the Spanish Region (FTRE) that was permitted to operate openly. The FTRE itself only existed until 1888.

== See also ==
- International Workingmen's Association
- Anarchism in Spain
