= Josep Termes =

Spanish historian and literary scholar

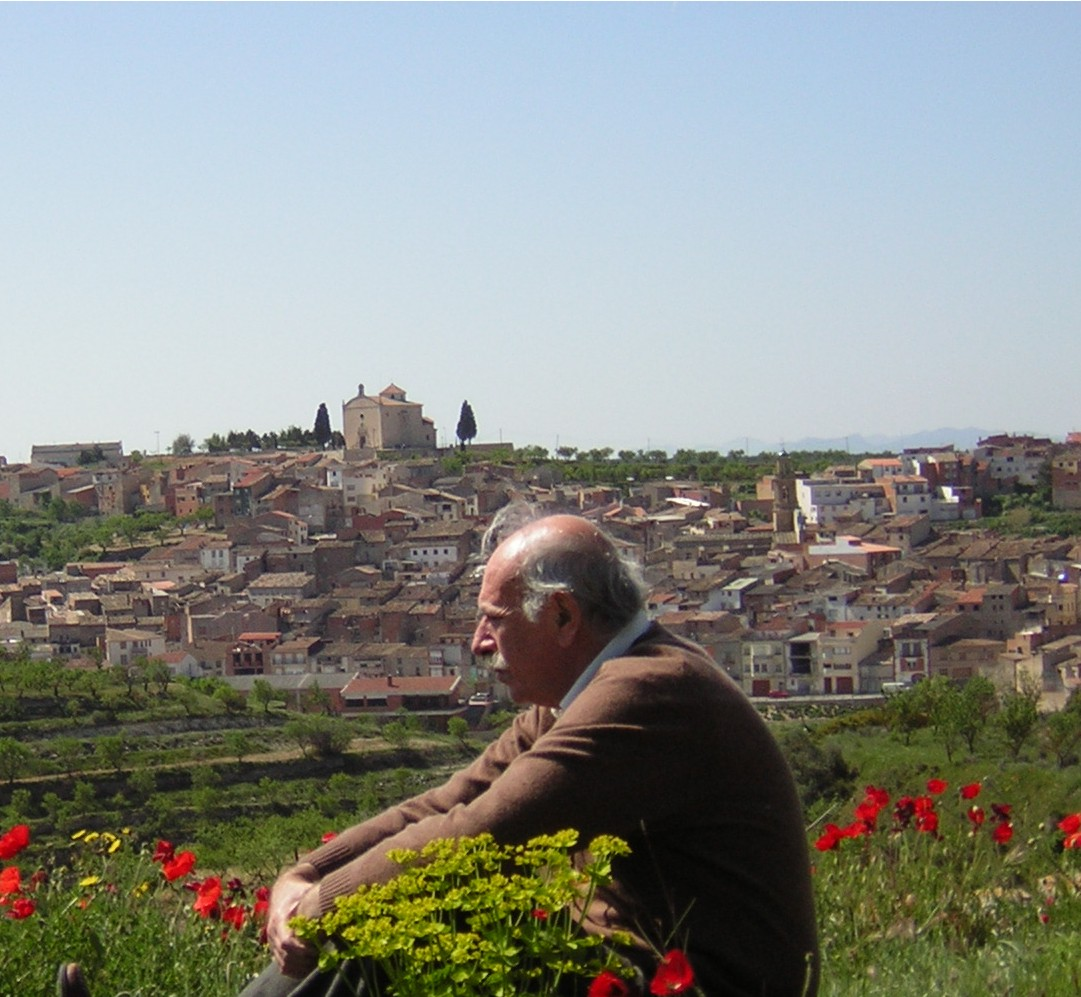
- Josep Termes in 2006
- Born: Josep Termes i Ardèvol; 1936; Barcelona
- Died: 2011 (aged 74–75); Barcelona
- Occupation: historian
- Known for: anarchism historian

Josep Termes i Ardèvol (1936 in Barcelona – 2011) was a Catalan historian.

== Biography ==
Josep Termes i Ardèvol was born in the same month and year as the Spanish Civil War broke out, in a working-class environment, to whose memory he always wished to remain true. He studied at Barcelona University in the nineteen fifties, reading Pharmacy first, and, after the Students’ Movement of 1956, Arts, where he specialised in Contemporary History. It was also then when he joined the PSUC, the party he quit in 1974 due to the disagreements he had within the committee of intellectuals. From then on he was a fierce critic of Marxist dogma. Taking Casimir Martí's book, Orígenes del anarquismo en Barcelona (The Origins of Anarchism in Barcelona) as his guide, he began to study the workers’ movement, especially the anarchists, in Catalonia and Spain in the 19th and 20th centuries. This dedication, of which his thesis Anarquismo y sindicalismo en España. La Primera Internacional, 1864-1884 (Anarchism and Syndicalism in Spain. The First International, 1972) is a landmark, culminated shortly before his death with a voluminous work of synthesis: Història del moviment anarquista a Espanya, 1870-1980 (The History of the Anarchist Movement in Spain), L’Avenç, 2011.

Expelled from Barcelona University, in 1958 as a student and in 1966 as a lecturer for his anti-Francoist activity, he returned there after being part of the initial team of the Autonomous University of Barcelona. From 1991 to 2006 he was a member of the Jaume Vicens Vives University Institute at Pompeu Fabra University. His work was characterised by the desire to revise some of the interpretations that have been made of the contemporary history of Catalonia, and in particular of the bourgeois nature of Catalanism, based above all on a paper he presented in 1974 at the Historians’ Symposium on El nacionalisme català. Problemes d’interpretació (Catalan Nationalism, Problems of Interpretation), the seeds of his studies on popular Catalanism, to which he returned in books like Les arrels populars del catalanisme (The Popular Roots of Catalanism, 1999) and others. His private library, with over 20,000 volumes, books and leaflets, and a notable library of press cuttings, was donated to the Museum of the History of Catalonia. In 2006 he was awarded the Premi d'Honor de les Lletres Catalanes.

== Publications ==
Main works:

- Anarquismo y sindicalismo en España: La primera Internacional (1864-1881) (1972)
- Els moviments socials a Catalunya, País Valencià i les Illes (1967), with Emili Giralt, Alfons Cucó and Albert Balcells
- El nacionalisme català. Problemes d'interpretació (1974)
- Federalismo, anarcosindicalismo y catalanismo (1976)
- La immigració a Catalunya i altres estudis d'història del nacionalisme català (1984).
- De la Revolució de setembre a la fi de la guerra civil (1987) Vol. 6 of Història de Catalunya, directed by Pierre Vilar
- Les Bases de Manresa de 1892 i els orígens del catalanisme (1992) with Agustí Colomines
- Les arrels populars del catalanisme (1999)
- Història del catalanisme fins al 1923 (2000)
- Històries de la Catalunya treballadora (2000)
- Patriotes i resistents. Història del primer catalanisme (2003) with Agustí Colomines
- Misèria contra pobresa. Els fets de la Fatarella del gener de 1937 (2005)
- Història del moviment anarquista a Espanya (1870-1980) (L'Avenç, 2011)
