= Manuel Tuñón de Lara =

Spanish historian

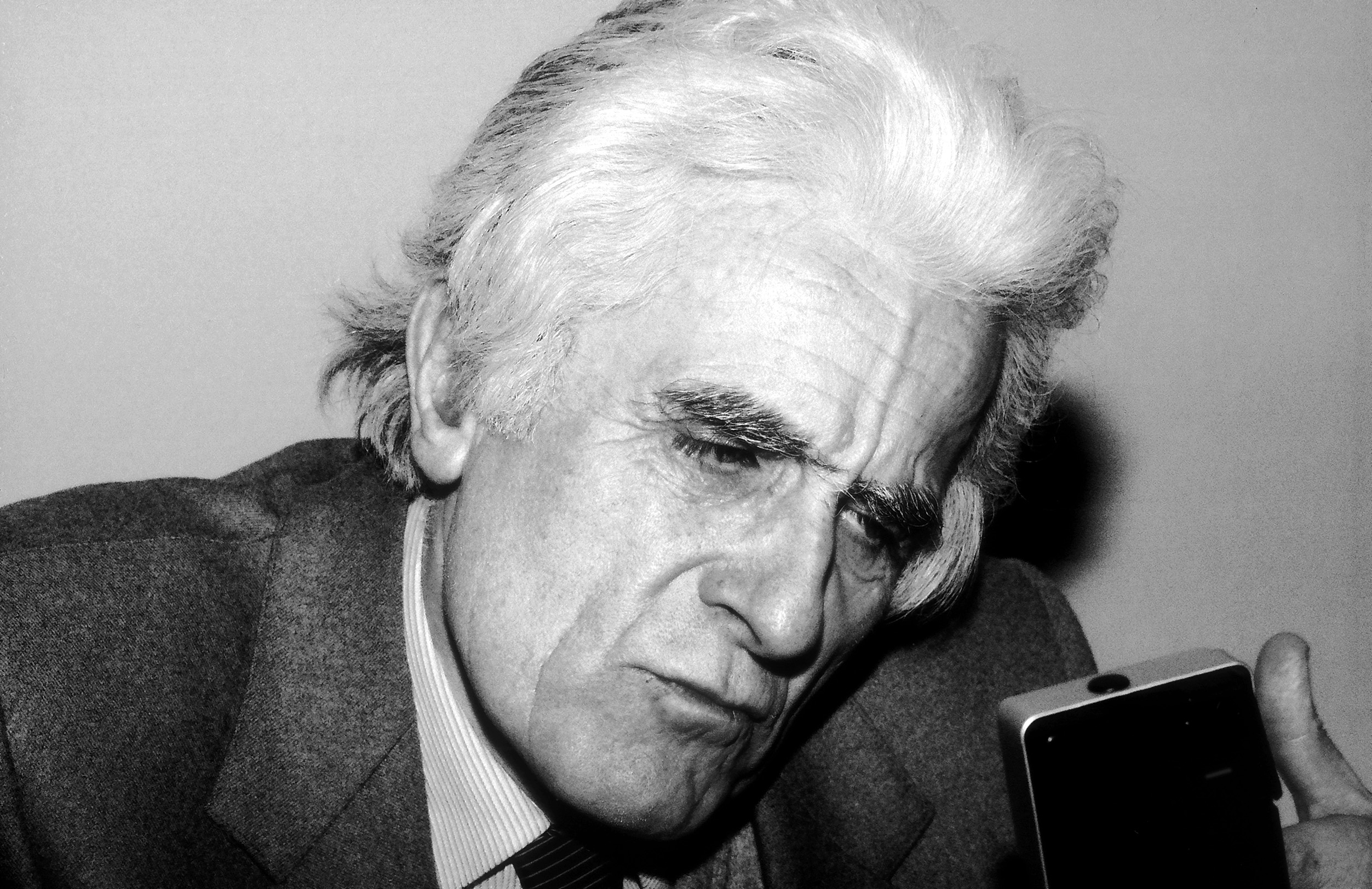
- Tuñón de Lara in 1982
- Born: September 8, 1915; Madrid
- Died: January 25, 1997 (aged 81); Lejona
- Education: Universidad de Madrid
- Occupations: Historian and professor
- Employers: University of Pau and Pays de l'Adour; Universidad de las Islas Baleares; Universidad del País Vasco
- Political party: Unión de Juventudes Comunistas de España; Juventudes Socialistas Unificadas
- Awards: Gran Cruz de la Orden Civil de Alfonso X el Sabio (1996)

Manuel Tuñón de Lara (1915–1997) was a Spanish historian.

== Life ==
Born in Madrid on 8 September 1915. He earned law degree from the University of Madrid in 1936. In 1932 he had joined the Communist Youth Union, in 1937 becoming director of the cadre school of the Unified Socialist Youth, and earning a place on the central committee. At the end of the Spanish Civil War he was interned in a concentration camp.

In 1946 he fled to Paris to escape persecution for his membership in the Union of Free Intellectuals. In Paris he completed his studies in history and authored numerous articles, which appeared in various Communist-affiliated publications throughout the world.

In 1964 he became a professor and chair of Spanish history and Spanish literature at the University of Pau, where from 1970 to 1980 he organized the Colloquiums on the Contemporary History of Spain, which encouraged the study of social history and served as a focal point of discussion and debate, attracting many visiting scholars from Spanish universities.

After the death of Francisco Franco and the end of the dictatorship, Tuñón de Lara returned to Spain and continued teaching as a professor of the University of the Balearic Islands and the University of the Basque Country.

He had four children : Sergio (1939), Elena (1943) Tuñón de Lara Arrazola, José Manuel Tunon de Lara (1958) and Paloma (1960) Tuñón de Lara Villanueva. He died in Leioa on 25 January 1997.

== Works ==
- Espagne (1955)
- From Incas to Indios (1956)
- El movimiento obrero en la historia de España (1962)
- Variaciones del nivel de vida en España (1965)
- Introducción a la historia del movimiento obrero (1965)
- La España del siglo XX (1965)
- Antonio Machado, poeta del pueblo (1967)
- Medio siglo de cultura española (1970)
- Estudios sobre el siglo XIX español (1971)
- Metodología de la Historia social de España (1973)
- La España del siglo XIX (1974)
- La Segunda República (1976)
- Luchas obreras y campesinas en la Andalucía del siglo XX : Jaén (1917-1920) : Sevilla (1930-1932) (1978)
- España bajo la dictadura franquista (1980)
- Tres claves para la Segunda República (1985)
- España: la quiebra de 1898 (1986)
- Historia de España (editor) (1988)
- Comunicación y cultura durante la II República y la Guerra Civil (1990)
