= 1881 Barcelona Workers' Congress =

- Native name: Congreso Obrero de Barcelona de 1881
- Date: September 24–25, 1881
- Location: Teatro Circo, Barcelona, Catalonia, Spain
- Cause: Dissolution of the FRE-AIT; Institution of freedom of association
- Motive: Reorganization of the Spanish workers' movement
- Outcome: Establishment of the FRTE

The 1881 Barcelona Workers' Congress was a congress of the workers' societies of Spain held in Barcelona in September 1881, during the reign of Alfonso XII, from which the new Federation of Workers of the Spanish Region emerged, with an anarcho-collectivist tendency, which replaced the Spanish Regional Federation of the International Workingmen's Association (FRE-AIT) founded eleven years earlier in a labor congress also held in Barcelona.

== Background ==
During the period in which the FRE-AIT operated clandestinely (1874–1881), ideological and strategic differences emerged within it. At the beginning of 1881, the possibility of legal action was glimpsed in view of the possibility that the Liberal Party of Práxedes Mateo Sagasta, who had promised recognition of freedom of association. So the Catalan anarcho-syndicalist group led by Josep Llunas i Pujals, Rafael Farga, Antoni Pellicer and Eudald Canivell i Masbernat tried to take advantage of the opportunity offered to put an end to the period of secrecy and proposed to change the policy of the Federal Commission, which "had moved away from the idea of large labor movements, in favor of secret groups, supporters of direct action."

For this purpose, he convened an Extraordinary Regional Conference that was held from February 6 to 9, 1881 in Gràcia which was attended by a "regional" delegate of the FRE and during which the Commission —composed by Anselmo Lorenzo, José García Viñas, Trinidad Soriano, Nacher, and González Morago - was dismissed and replaced by a new one formed by the Catalan leaders, plus the Mallorcan bricklayer Francesc Tomàs Oliver. "The history of the FRE-AIT ended here, to give way to the reconstruction of a powerful trade union movement, something that the same men of the Alliance, the Barcelona anarcho-syndicalists, professional workers, who imposed themselves on the insurrectionary anarchists not very inclined to public union action." Almost simultaneously the celebration of the Extraordinary Conference the liberal government of Práxedes Mateo Sagasta approved freedom of association.

On July 10, some fifty workers 'societies in Catalonia - which had held a previous assembly in March - made public a manifesto, probably written by Farga Pellicer, in which they called a workers' congress of the Spanish Region in Barcelona for the end of September. Soon the "collectivist workers" from twenty-two towns in the rest of Spain joined the proposal.

That same month of July, a Congress of workers' societies from different countries was held in London in which an attempt was made to rebuild the Anarchist International, which was not achieved, but in which a resolution that said that "oral and written propaganda" should be joined "propaganda of the deed" and that illegalism was the only way "that leads to revolution", recommending resorting to the dynamite to reach it. As this resolution was totally contrary to the trade union and legal path advocated by the new management of the FRE, it decided not to disseminate the resolution in Spain.

== Development ==
Congress delegates declare that individual rights are by their nature imprescriptible and illegislable; that universal suffrage, right of association, freedom of the press, as well as autonomy of the individual, of the municipality, of the comarca and of the region, will not be a truth until individual property is transformed into collective property, so that, entering the workers' collectivities to take possession in usufruct of the factories, workshops, railways, machines and tools, as well as the raw materials, soil, subsoil, mines, etc., for this reason alone the economically emancipated individual remains, and therefore, in a position to agree with complete independence and to freely exercise all rights inherent to the human personality, provided that the individual fulfills the essential duty to produce. [...]
Our organization, purely economic, is different and opposed to that of all bourgeois political parties and workers' politicians, since just as they organize themselves for the conquest of political power, we organize ourselves so that the political and legal states currently existing, are reduced to purely economic functions, establishing instead a free federation of free associations of free producers.

— Manifesto approved at the Founding Congress of the FRTE (Barcelona, September 25, 1881)

The Congress was held between September 24 and 25, 1881 at the Teatro Circo de Barcelona on Montserrat Street, the same place where the Barcelona Workers' Congress of 1870 had been held. Its main agreement was the founding of the new Federation of Workers of the Spanish Region (FRTE), conforming to legality by suppressing the word "international", one of the reasons that had motivated the prohibition of its predecessor the FRE-AIT. 140 delegates attended representing 162 organizations from 72 localities, of which 35 were from Catalonia and 26 from Andalusia. Pablo Iglesias who had come to represent the Marxist socialist group in Madrid was not allowed to attend. In the "Manifesto to the workers of the Spanish Region" approved in Congress, and of which 28,500 copies were published, anti-politicalism and anarcho-collectivism were reaffirmed:

We are adversaries of all parliamentary politics and determined champions of the economic struggle, of the destructive politics of all privileges and all monopolies of this unjust organization of present society. [...] The Workers' Congress declares itself collectivist in terms of property, anarchist or autonomist in terms of social organization.

The anarchist newspaper Le Révolte, edited in Geneva by Peter Kropotkin, enthusiastically welcomed the emergence of the FTRE, a continuation of the FRE, even stating that the workers' movement was reborn in Europe.

The Federal Commission was established on October 7 and was formed by the Barcelona internationalist group that had taken the initiative to end the FRE - Josep Llunas i Pujals, Rafael Farga Pellicer and Antoni Pellicer - as well as Francesc Tomàs Oliver.

== Bibliography ==
- Avilés Farré, Juan (2013). La daga y la dinamita. Los anarquistas y el nacimiento del terrorismo (in Spanish). Barcelona: Tusquets Editores. ISBN 978-84-8383-753-5.
- Termes, Josep (1977). Anarquismo y sindicalismo en España. La Primera Internacional (1864-1881) (in Spanish). Barcelona: Crítica. ISBN 84-7423-023-3.
- Termes, Josep (2011). Historia del anarquismo en España (1870-1980) (in Spanish). Barcelona: RBA. ISBN 978-84-9006-017-9.
- Tuñón de Lara, Manuel (1977) [1972]. El movimiento obrero en la historia de España. I.1832-1899 (in Spanish) (2ª ed.). Barcelona: Laia. ISBN 84-7222-331-0.
