= Josep Llunas i Pujals =

Catalan anarchist (1852–1905)

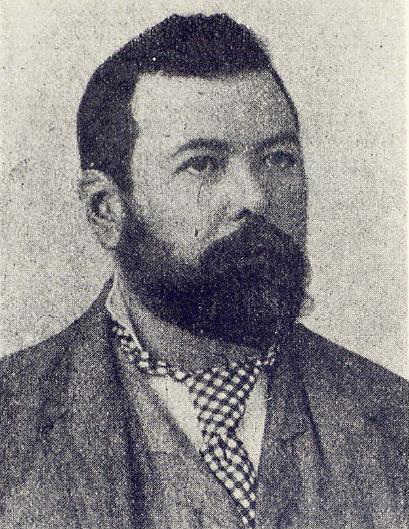
- Josep Llunas i Pujals c. 1900
- Born: 30 January 1852; Reus, Tarragona, Spain
- Died: 23 May 1905 (aged 53); Barcelona, Spain
- Occupations: Typesetter, journalist
- Years active: 1870–1905
- Organization(s): FRE-AIT (1870–1881); FTRE (1881–1888)
- Movement: Anarchism in Spain

Josep Llunas i Pujals (30 January 1852 – 23 May 1905) was a Catalan anarchist, journalist and trade unionist. He joined the Spanish Regional Federation of the International Workingmen's Association (FRE-AIT) in 1872 and, by the 1880s, became one of the leading exponents of anarcho-syndicalism in Spain. In 1881, he co-founded the Federation of Workers of the Spanish Region (FTRE), which he conceived of as an anarchist trade union federation capable of establishing a classless society. He was at the centre of a dispute between collectivist and communist anarchists, during which he took the side of the former. He left the labour movement after the anarchist movement adopted terrorist tactics, and spent the last year of his life in sports journalism.

== Biography ==
Josep Llunas i Pujals was born in the province of Tarragona in 1852. He worked as a typographer and moved to the Catalan capital of Barcelona, where he worked in the printing industry. Llunas began his political career as a member of the Federal Democratic Republican Party, before gravitating towards anarchism and a progressive approach to Catalan nationalism. In the early 1870s, he joined a printers' trade union and became secretary of a Catalan workers' social centre. Through these organisations, in 1872, he joined the Spanish Regional Federation of the International Workingmen's Association (FRE-AIT) and was elected as general secretary of its local federation in Barcelona. At this time, he came under the influence of the Russian anarchist Mikhail Bakunin.

By the 1880s, Llunas had become one the leading figures of the Spanish labour movement, alongside Rafael Farga Pellicer and Anselmo Lorenzo. From Barcelona, Llunas and Farga headed the syndicalist faction of the FRE-AIT. They upheld the central role of trade unions in creating a post-capitalist society and believed that the FRE ought to operate legally, rather than clandestinely, which put them in opposition to insurrectionary anarchist tendencies. Llunas himself became the main advocate of anarcho-syndicalism during the late 19th century in Spain.

In 1881, Llunas and Farga disbanded the rump FRE and established the Federation of Workers of the Spanish Region (FTRE) in its place. Under the leadership of the Catalan syndicalists, the FTRE was set up to be a specifically anarchist organisation. Llunas and Farga, along with their fellow syndicalists Antonio Pellicer Paraire, Francisco Tomás and Eudaldo Canibell, established a five-person commission to lead the new FTRE. The establishment of the FTRE provoked a fierce debate between communist and collectivist anarchists over both strategy and ideological goals. Llunas took the side of the collectivists, aligned with the newspaper El Productor. In September 1882, Llunas gave the keynote speech at the Second Congress of the FTRE in Seville. He convinced the congress to adopt a collectivist economic programme, despite vocal criticisms from the Andalusian communist Miguel Rubio.

By the time of the organisation's Third Congress, held in Valencia the following year, many Andalusian communists had already broken away from the FTRE, causing it to lose 20% of its members. The federal commission was moved to Valladolid and all of its members, including Llunas himself, were replaced. He subsequently turned his attention away from the FTRE and towards his new publication, La Tramontana, a Catalan language periodical which became famous for its anti-clerical and anarchist satire. He also contributed to a number of Spanish language anarchist publications, including Acracia and El Productor. In these publications he developed his collectivist theory on the role of the trade union in the establishment of a classless society, which he believed would be based on collective ownership, federalism and workers' self-management. He centred the FTRE in this analysis, holding it up as an example of an anarchist trade union, organised from the bottom-up, which brought together workers of different crafts into industrial unions and regional federations.

Internal antagonisms within the anarchist movement were exacerbated by the Mano Negra affair. Llunas travelled to Madrid to express his support for the syndicalist faction around Juan Serrano Oteiza, but they eventually succumbed to pressure and lost ground to the anti-syndicalists. In July 1885, he participated in the First Socialist Gathering in Reus. By the 1890s, communist anarchism and insurrectionary anarchism had supplanted collectivism as the leading tendencies of the Spanish anarchist movement. In 1893, Llunas attempted to protest the anarchist adoption of terrorism, writing critical articles on the issue in La Tramontana, but he was unable to stop it. In August 1895, Llunas joined the organising committee of the Catalan General Association of Freethinkers, which sought to defend nascent Spanish democracy against reactionary attacks. In 1896, Llunas was arrested and imprisoned as part of the Montjuïc trials. He was forced to close down La Tramontana and cease his political activism. By the turn of the 20th century, Llunas had lost his influence over the labour movement and turned instead towards sports journalism, contributing to Los Deportes and Barcelona Sport. He died in 1905.

== Selected works ==
- Estudios filosófico-sociales (1882)
- La revolució: poema en tres cants (1886)
- El Ariete Socialista Internacional (1887)
- Qüestions socials (1891)
- Los partits socialistes espanyols (1892)
- La Ley y la clase obrera (1893)

== Bibliography ==
- Abelló i Güell, Teresa (2010). "Anarchism in the Catalan-speaking countries: between syndicalism an propaganda (1868-1931)". Catalan Historical Review. 3 (3): 87–102. doi:10.2436/20.1000.01.41. ISSN 2013-407X.
- Arkinstall, Christine (2014). Spanish Female Writers and the Freethinking Press, 1879-1926. University of Toronto Press. ISBN 9781442647657.
- Esenwein, George Richard (1989). Anarchist Ideology and the Working-class Movement in Spain, 1868-1898. University of California Press. ISBN 978-0520063983.
- Gabriel, Pere (2002). "Red Barcelona in the Europe of war and revolution, 1914–30". In Smith, Angel (ed.). Red Barcelona: Social Protest and Labour Mobilization in the Twentieth Century. Routledge. pp. 44–65. doi:10.4324/9780203219379-3 (inactive 6 July 2025). ISBN 9780203219379.
- Pedret Otero, Gerard (2022). "Josep Llunas i Pujals". Historia Hispánica (in Spanish). Royal Academy of History.
