= Seville Congress =

- Native name: Congreso de Sevilla
- Date: September 24–26, 1882
- Location: Seville, Andalusia, Spain
- Also known as: 2nd Congress of the FTRE
- Type: Congress
- Organised by: Federation of Workers of the Spanish Region
- Outcome: Accession of the collectivist and legalist theses; Split of The Disinherited from the Federation

The Seville Congress was the Second Congress of the newly created Federation of Workers of the Spanish Region held in Seville in September 1882.

== Background ==
The Federation of Workers of the Spanish Region had been founded in the Barcelona Workers' Congress of 1881 after the Liberal government of Práxedes Mateo Sagasta recognized the right of association thus ending the period of forced secrecy of its predecessor, the Spanish Regional Federation of the IWA. The following year the FTRE already had about 60,000 members, which, as Clara Lida has highlighted, is still surprising since after almost ten years of persecution and in hiding the Spanish anarchist movement, far from disappearing, had re-emerged with such force, going from 30,000 members in 1873, with the FRE-AIT, to 60,000 in 1882, with the FTRE. Lida also highlighted that the "profile" of the new FTRE was very different from that of the FRE-AIT eight years earlier. "Unlike in 1873, when the manufacturing, industrial and urban areas of Barcelona, Valencia (including Alicante) and Madrid predominated, the profile of the new militants in 1882 was strongly Andalusian, with great weight of the agrarian organizations that for a decade they had united in the Union of Rural Workers (UTC), specifically aimed at organizing the agricultural proletariat within the Spanish Federation.”

== Development ==
The Congress was held between September 24 and 26, 1882 at the Cervantes Theater in Seville. 251 delegates attended representing 8 ex officio Unions - the most important being that of Rural Workers, which had 20,915 members, followed by Manufacturers, with 10,000 - and 218 local Federations, more than half of Andalusia - 130 that group to 38,000 affiliates, which represented almost two-thirds of the total - followed by Catalonia with 53 Federations that grouped 13,000 affiliates.

In Congress, the anarcho-collectivists and the "legalists", led by the Catalan Josep Llunas - who was elected a member of the Federal Commission - and the Galician Ricardo Mella, and the anarcho-communists and insurrectionalists, led by the Andalusian Miguel Rubio, faced each other for the first time. Llunas affirmed that to achieve the revolution it was necessary to fight "with the weapons of reason and intelligence, instructing and enlightening ourselves, in a word, by means of the scientific revolution, not in riots and revolts.” In direct relation to this issue, the legality or illegality of the movement was discussed. “While some, especially the Catalan trade unionists, wanted a public movement that would structure a labor movement as massive as possible and legal, others, especially in Andalusia, wanted it to maintain its secret and revolutionary character, and be willing to practice propaganda of the deed. The conflict in the Andalusian countryside would put the tensions and differences between the two models to the test.”

In the manifesto approved in Congress, the moderate anarcho-collectivist and legalist theses triumphed - it was proclaimed, for example, that strikes "when we cannot necessarily avoid them, we will do them regulation and solidarity" - which was applauded by the liberal press, such as the influential Madrid newspaper El Imparcial which highlighted that "the anarchist workers of Spain" - unlike what was happening in France where "the supporters of anarchy and of collectivism present themselves at their meetings as furious madmen demanding blood and extermination" - "they have just celebrated their annual congress with such correctness in the procedures, so much temperance in the forms and such unanimity in the agreements, that it could well serve as a lesson to many political assemblies of doctors in parliamentary customs".

However, "unanimity" within the FTRE was not such, as demonstrated by the fact that the illegalists shortly after the Seville Congress constituted a new federation under the name of Los Desinheredados. In their press organ The Social Revolution they denounced years later that the Federal Commission had not published the agreement of the London Congress of 1881 on "propaganda of the deed".

And on the other hand, it was not clear that the authorities and employers were going to tolerate the existence of an anarchist organization that advocated the social revolution. Thus, at the end of 1882, the FTRE newspaper The Social Magazine reported that in some places members of the organization were not hired or forced to leave if they wanted to be hired, and many others had lost their job for that reason. The newspaper also denounced that "to the demonstrations that mass workers make in front of the municipalities asking for 'bread and work'", especially in Andalusia, which was going through a serious agrarian crisis, they responded "by arresting the most determined and sending forces of the Army to maintain order”, or by sending the Civil Guard to investigate the affiliates' meetings. For this reason, the newspaper demanded that the "public powers" not resort to "reprobate and illegal means" to repress the workers - "take us to the courts of justice, and they, that they acquit us or condemn us; but do not inhibit the workers' spirits, do not outrage them, do not threaten them, do not raid their homes, do not apprehend them, do not take them to jail like common criminals."

== Bibliography ==
- Avilés Farré, Juan (2013). La daga y la dinamita. Los anarquistas y el nacimiento del terrorismo (in Spanish). Barcelona: Tusquets Editores. ISBN 978-84-8383-753-5.
- Lida, Clara E. (2010). "La Primera Internacional en España, entre la organización pública y la clandestinidad (1868-1889)". In Julián Casanova (ed.). Tierra y Libertad. Cien años de anarquismo en España (in Spanish). Barcelona: Crítica. pp. 33–59. ISBN 978-84-9892-119-9.
- Termes, Josep (2011). Historia del anarquismo en España (1870-1980) (in Spanish). Barcelona: RBA. ISBN 978-84-9006-017-9.
- Tuñón de Lara, Manuel (1977) [1972]. El movimiento obrero en la historia de España. I.1832-1899 (in Spanish) (2ª ed.). Barcelona: Laia. ISBN 84-7222-331-0.
