= Federation of Workers of the Spanish Region =

- Federación de Trabajadores de la Región Española
- Abbreviation: FTRE
- Predecessor: Spanish Regional Federation of the IWA
- Successor: Union and Solidarity Pact
- Formation: September 25, 1881; 145 years ago
- Founded at: Barcelona
- Dissolved: October 1888; 138 years ago
- Purpose: Anarcho-syndicalism
- Members: 60,000 (1882)

The Federation of Workers of the Spanish Region (Spanish: Federación de Trabajadores de la Región Española, FTRE) was a Spanish anarchist organization founded in the Barcelona Workers' Congress of 1881 by the initiative of a group of Catalan anarcho-syndicalists headed Josep Llunas i Pujals, Rafael Farga Pellicer and Antoni Pellicer, after the dissolution of the Spanish Regional Federation of the International Workingmen's Association founded in the Barcelona Workers' Congress of 1870. It only had seven years of life since it was dissolved in 1888. Its failure, in which the episode of La Mano Negra was key, opened a new stage in the history of anarchism in Spain dominated by propaganda of the deed.

== History ==
=== The dissolution of the FRE and the birth of the FTRE ===
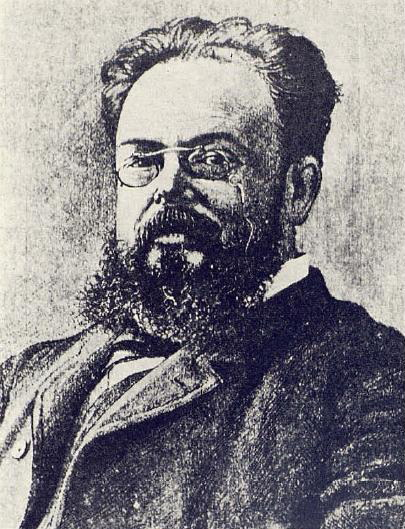
Rafael Farga Pellicer, one of the main promoters of the FTRE.

The ideological and strategic differences that arose within the Spanish Regional Federation led to its dissolution in 1881 as soon as the possibility of acting legally again was glimpsed. The initiative came from the Catalan anarcho-syndicalist group led by Josep Llunas i Pujals, Rafael Farga Pellicer, Antoni Pellicer i Paraire and Eudald Canivell i Masbernat who, tried taking advantage of the opportunity offered by the new liberal government chaired by Práxedes Mateo Sagasta that had promised the recognition of freedom of association —which would put an end to the period of secrecy—, they proposed to change the policy of the Federal Commission, which "had moved away from the idea of large labor movements, in favor of secret groups, supporters of direct action."

For this purpose, they convened an Extraordinary Regional Conference that was held from February 6 to 9, 1881 in Gràcia which was attended by one delegate per "region" and during which the dismissal of the Commission —integrated by Anselmo Lorenzo, José García Viñas, Trinidad Soriano, Nacher, and González Morago -, was dismissed and replaced by a new one made up of the Catalan leaders, plus the Mallorcan bricklayer Francisco Tomás Oliver. "The history of the Spanish Regional Federation of the AIT ended here, to give way to the reconstruction of a powerful union movement, something that the same men of the Alliance did, the anarcho-syndicalists from Barcelona, ex-officio workers, imposed themselves on the insurrectionary anarchists who were not very inclined to public union action." Almost simultaneously with the celebration of the Extraordinary Conference, the liberal government of Práxedes Mateo Sagasta approved freedom of association.

On July 10, some fifty workers 'societies in Catalonia - which had held a previous assembly in March - made public a manifesto, probably written by Farga Pellicer, in which they called a workers' congress of the Spanish Region in Barcelona for the end of September. Soon the "collectivist workers" from twenty-two towns in the rest of Spain joined the proposal.

The Congress, which was held between September 24 and 25, 1881 at the Teatro Circo de Barcelona on Montserrat Street, the same place where the Barcelona Workers' Congress of 1870 had been held, agreed to found the new Federation of Workers of the Spanish Region conforming to legality by suppressing the word "international", one of the reasons that had motivated the prohibition of its predecessor the FRE-AIT. In the "Manifesto to the workers of the Spanish Region" approved in Congress reaffirmed antipoliticism and anarcho-collectivism:

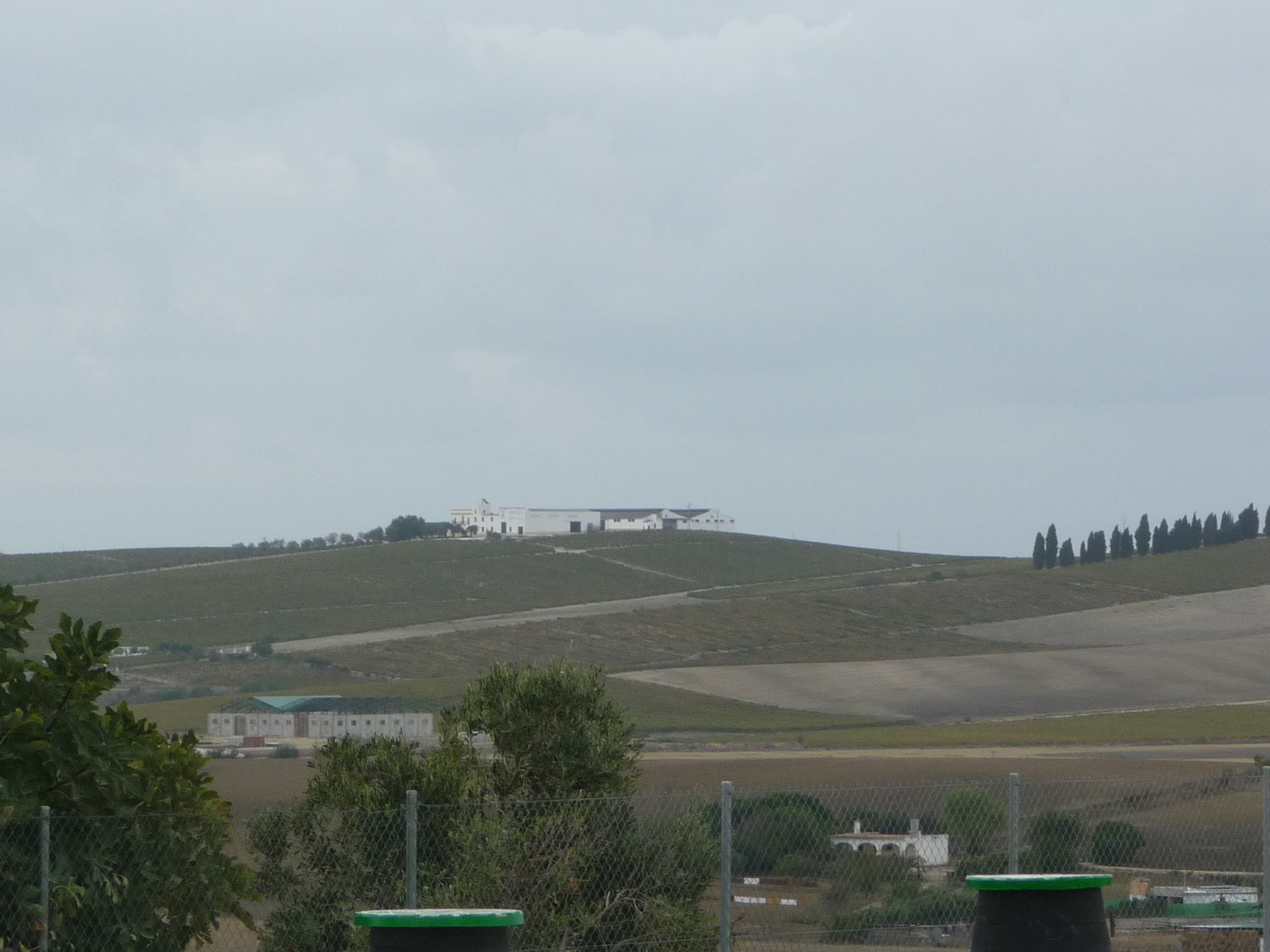
Vineyards in Jerez de la Frontera. In the FTRE, unlike its predecessor FRE-AIT, the federations that grouped Andalusian day laborers predominated.

We are adversaries of all parliamentary politics and determined champions of the economic struggle, of the destructive politics of all privileges and all monopolies of this unjust organization of present society. [...] The workers' Congress declares itself collectivist in terms of property, anarchist or autonomist in terms of social organization.

The Federal Commission was established on October 7 with the Barcelona internationalist group that had taken the initiative to end the FRE - Josep Llunas i Pujals, Rafael Farga Pellicer and Antoni Pellicer i Paraire - with Francisco Tomás Oliver.

One year after its founding, the FTRE already had about 60,000 members, which, as Clara Lida has highlighted, is still surprising since after almost ten years of persecution and in hiding the Spanish anarchist movement, far from disappearing, had resurfaced with such force, going from 30,000 affiliates in 1873 to 60,000 in 1882. Lida also stressed that the "profile" of the new FTRE was very different from that of the eight-year-old FRE-AIT before. "Unlike in 1873, when the manufacturing, industrial and urban areas of Barcelona, Valencia (including Alicante) and Madrid predominated, the profile of the new militants in 1882 was strongly Andalusian, with great weight from the agrarian organizations that for a decade they had united in the Union of Rural Workers (UTC), specifically aimed at organizing the agricultural proletariat within the Spanish Federation."

=== The Seville Congress of September 1882: anarcho-collectivism vs. anarcho-communism; legalism vs. illegalism ===
Between September 24 and 26, 1882, the 2nd FTRE Congress was held in Seville, in which the anarcho-collectivist and the "legalists" clashed for the first time, led by the Catalan Josep Llunas - who was elected a member of the Federal Commission— and the Galician Ricardo Mella, and the anarcho-communists and insurrectionalists, led by the Andalusian Miguel Rubio. The debate focused on maintaining the Federation in legality. "While some, especially the Catalan trade unionists, wanted a public movement that would structure a workers' movement as massive as possible and legal, others, especially in Andalusia, wanted it to maintain its secret and revolutionary character, and was willing to practice propaganda of the deed. The conflict in the Andalusian countryside would put the tensions and differences between the two models to the test."

In the manifesto approved in Congress, the moderate anarcho-collectivist and legalist theses triumphed - it was proclaimed, for example, that strikes "when we cannot necessarily avoid them, we will do them regulatory and solidarity". However, "unanimity" within the FTRE was not such, as demonstrated by the fact that the illegalists shortly after the Seville Congress constituted a new federation under the name of The Disinherited. In their press organ The Social Revolution they denounced years later that the Federal Commission had not published the agreement of the London Congress of 1881 on "propaganda of the deed".

And on the other hand, it was not clear that the authorities and employers were going to tolerate the existence of an anarchist organization that advocated the social revolution. Thus, at the end of 1882, the FTRE newspaper La Revista Social reported that in some places members of the organization were not hired or forced to leave if they wanted to be hired, and many others had lost their job for that reason. The newspaper also denounced that "to the demonstrations that the workers en masse make before the municipalities asking for bread and work", especially in Andalusia that was going through a serious agrarian crisis, they responded "by arresting the most determined and sending forces of the Army to maintain order", or by sending the Civil Guard to investigate the affiliates' meetings. For this reason, the newspaper demanded that the "public powers" not resort to "reprobate and illegal means" to repress the workers - "take us to the courts of justice, and they, that they acquit us or condemn us; but do not inhibit the workers' spirits, do not outrage them, do not threaten them, do not raid their homes, do not apprehend them, do not take them to jail like common criminals."

=== The episode of the "Black Hand" and the crisis of the FTRE (1882-1883) ===
At the beginning of November 1882, the chief colonel of the Civil Guard in Western Andalusia sent the government a copy of the "regulations" of a secret organization called the "Black Hand" that he had found and by which "the Socialists" in the region, which according to the report was proof that this secret organization was behind the "fires, felling of mountains and trees, injuries or murders" that were taking place in those months of agrarian crisis. Two weeks after receiving the documents, the government decided to send reinforcements to the province of Cádiz. On November 21, a group of 90 civil guards arrived in Jerez under the command of Captain José Oliver y Vidal who immediately, with the help of the head of the Jerez municipal guard, Tomás Pérez Monforte, proceeded to arrest hundreds of day laborers and affiliates of the FRTE, supposed members of the mysterious Black Hand. In a few weeks there were more than 3,000 day laborers and anarchists imprisoned — Josep Termes gives a much higher figure: 2,000 in Cádiz and 3,000 in Jerez. As Avilés Farré has pointed out, "in most cases the reason why they were detained was not for belonging to the Black Hand, but to the FTRE". The body of the FRTE La Revista Social protested the indiscriminate arrests of members of the organization.

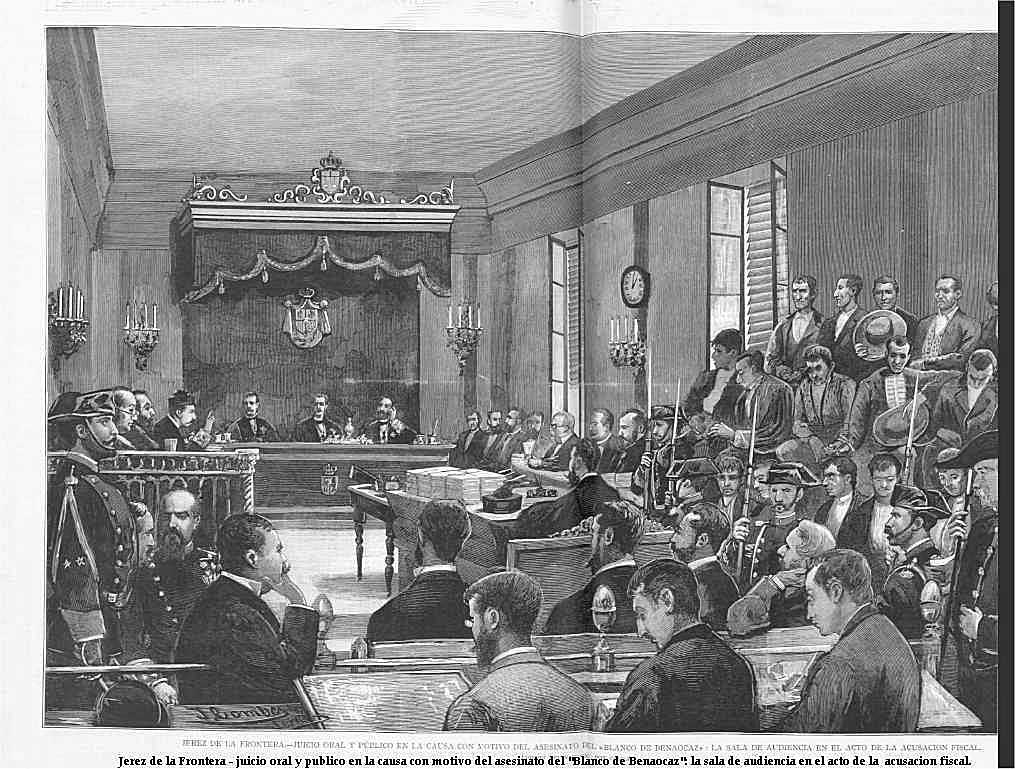
Trial held in 1883 in Jerez de la Frontera for the murder of Blanco de Benaocaz, attributed to La Mano Negra.

The press, both in Cádiz and in Madrid, dealt with the matter without questioning the existence of the Black Hand and creating an atmosphere of fear based on sensational articles on the "abominable association", "abortion of dementia and crime." It focused on the three crimes of which the Black Hand was accused. On December 4, two days after the first wave of arrests ordered by Captain Oliver, a couple of innkeepers were assassinated on the road to Trebujena, near Jerez de la Frontera. Two months later, on February 4, the corpse, buried in the open field, of a young peasant named Bartolomé Gago, better known as "El Blanco de Benaocaz", who later became known to have been assassinated the same day as the innkeepers. It was known as the crime of the Parrilla. At that time, it transpired that the death of the young ranch guard named Fernando Olivera, which occurred in August 1882, had not been an accident, but had been caused by the strong blows he had received in the belly. In February 1883 the government sent a special judge to Jerez to investigate the facts. And the matter also reached the Courts where it was debated on February 28.

The government supported by the owners and by the press - although there were exceptions such as the newspaper El Liberal - identified the Black Hand with the FTRE with a dual purpose, according to Clara Lida: "firstly, to drastically stop the growing force of the International in Spain. The second objective was more local: it was about making it impossible for the farm workers to organize and preventing an agrarian strike from making it difficult to harvest the crops." The Federal Committee of the FTRE, which had already reiterated that the propaganda could not be carried out "neither because of the robbery, nor because of the kidnapping, nor because of the murder," replied that it had no connection with the Black Hand, "nor with any secret association that has for its own sake an objective to perpetrate crimes of common law, refusing all solidarity with those who have committed or may commit criminal acts." It also condemned illegalism again, thus deepening "even more the differences between the Catalan anarcho-syndicalist nucleus and the Andalusian illegalists, as well as those who were beginning to be born in and around Barcelona, especially in Gràcia, also prone to direct action".

For the crime of La Parrilla, on June 18, 1883, the Jerez court sentenced seven people to death and another eight to seventeen years and four months in prison. Two of the accused were acquitted. But the prosecutor appealed the sentence to the Supreme Court which in April 1884 sentenced all but one to capital punishment. Nine had the death sentence commuted to prison but seven were executed by garrote on June 14, 1884, in Jerez - among them the school teacher Juan Ruiz. Regarding the crime of the landlords, four people were sentenced to death, but they were not executed. For the third crime, that of Fernando Oliveira, two people were tried, and one of them was sentenced to a long prison term.

Regarding the existence or not of the "Black Hand", Tuñón de Lara affirms that "nothing allows, in short, to speak of the "Black Hand" as an organization. This is not an obstacle to the existence of small "mafias" (groups influenced by anarcho-communism), on the frontiers of secular rebellion and common crime that, skillfully exploited by the organs of Power, served to justify a repression and a campaign that, despite their protests, would in some way break the FTRE." For his part, Josep Termes affirms that it was "a police setup", although he acknowledges that "it is undeniable that violence was present in agrarian Andalusia." According to Avilés Farré, "the regulations of the Black Hand and the People's Court were understood by some Civil Guard commanders as proof of a vast clandestine conspiracy, which would be behind all the acts of violence that had been taking place in the fields of western Andalusia. The ominous name of the Black Hand came to specify in something specific a diffuse fear and had an undoubted journalistic appeal, although ultimately in no process was any activity attributable to that mysterious organization ever proven."

The 3rd Congress of the FTRE held in Valencia from October 4 to October 1883, accused the impact of the "Black Hand" affair as fewer delegates and federations attended than the previous one held in Seville (152 delegates representing 88 local Federations; no the data of the total affiliates were given). On the "Black Hand", the Congress protested the confusion of "our public, legal and revolutionary organization, with other factions with objectionable objectives" and once again rejected any solidarity with those who organize "the perpetration of common crimes", also agreeing "to dissolve the Federation if it cannot act calmly in the law." The Manifesto of Congress concluded: "In order to redeem itself, the proletariat needs to be, in addition to being intelligent, honest, and honest to all tests."

=== The decline and final dissolution of the FTRE (1883-1888) ===
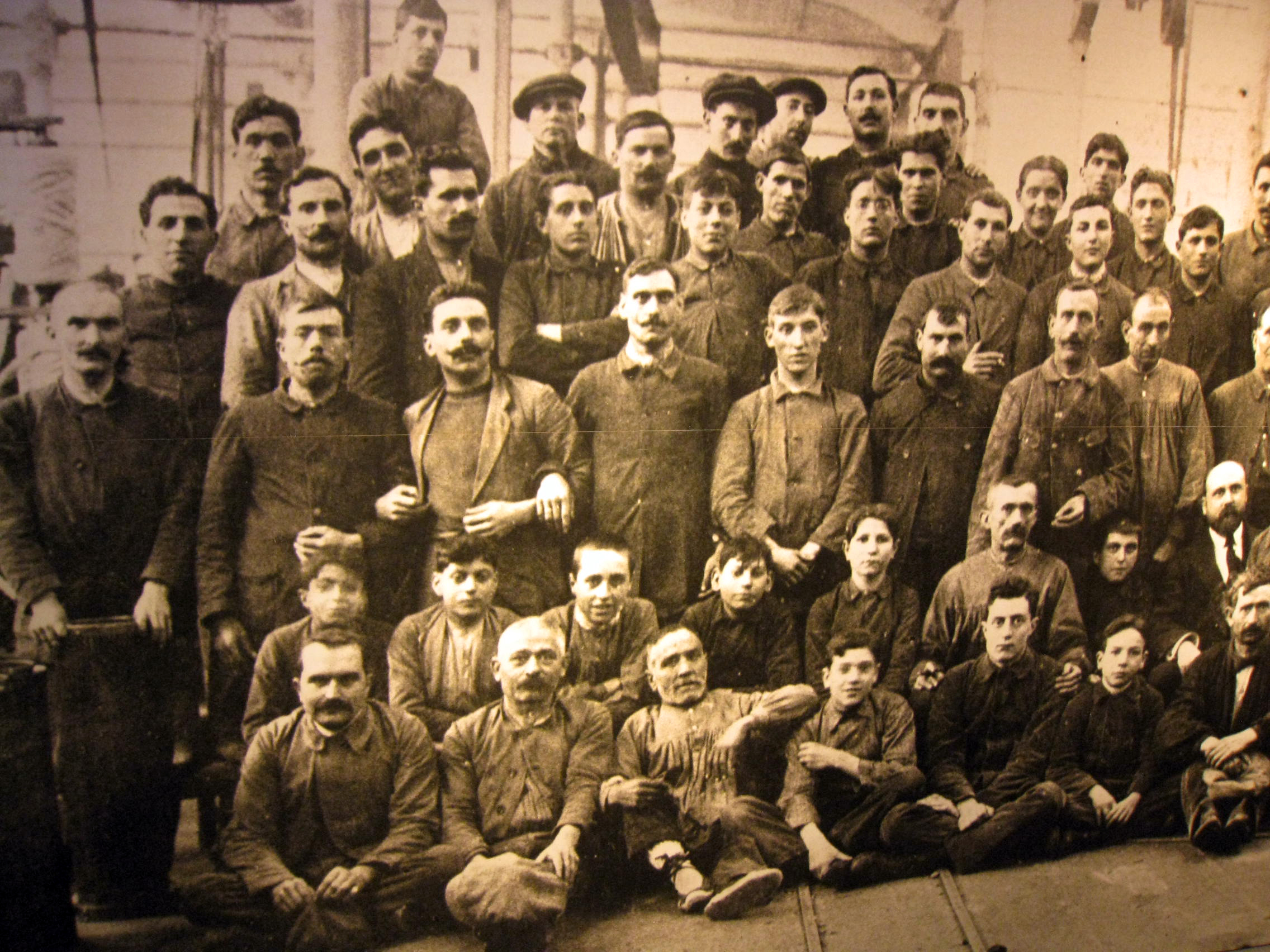
Workers of a Catalan textile factory

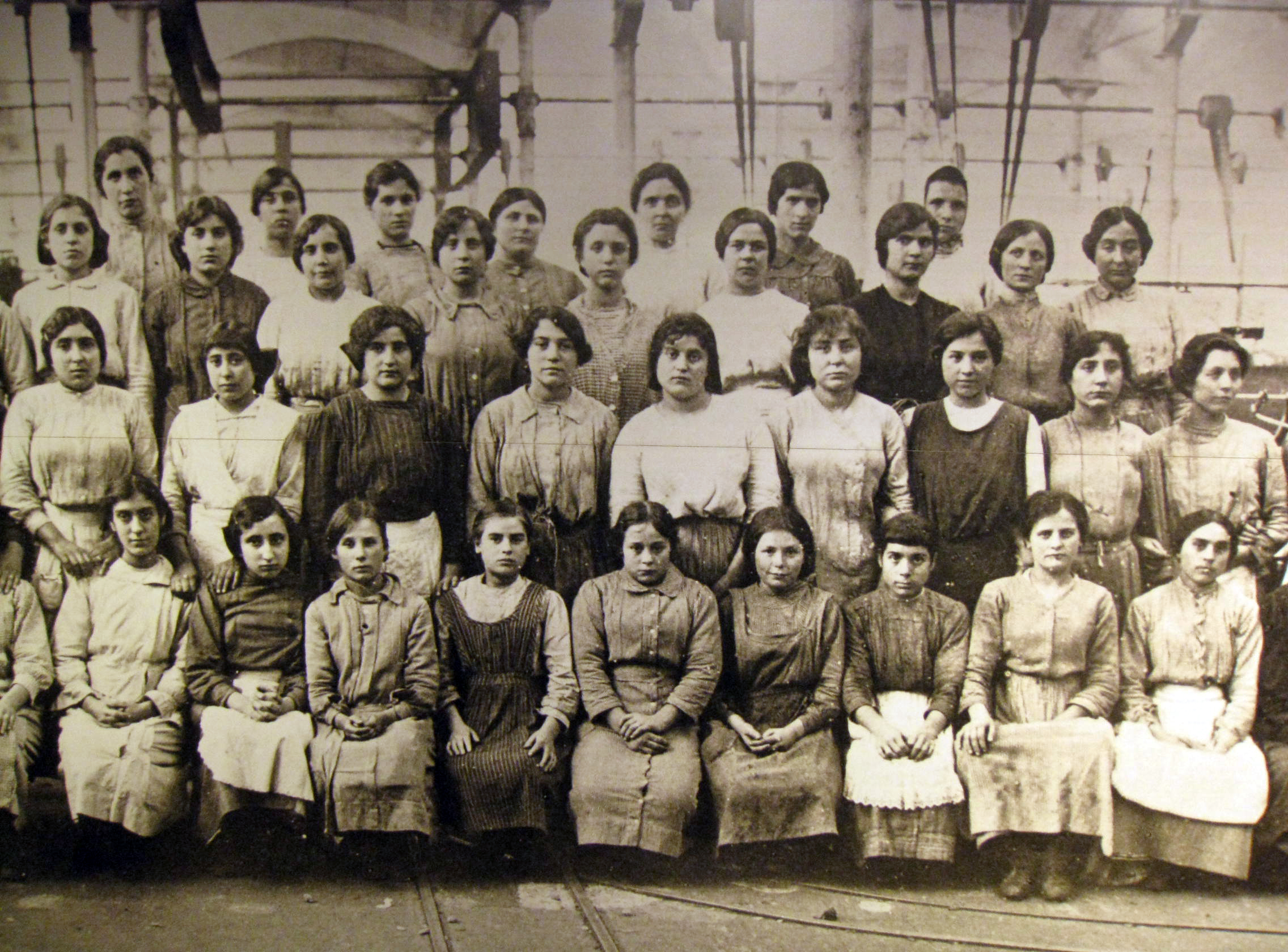
Workers of the same factory

The social impact that the Black Hand affair had and the fear that it would cause the FTRE to be outlawed, caused the Federal Committee, based in Barcelona, to distance itself from the Andalusian movement, accepting the version given by the government and by the press. The angry response of the Andalusian federations was immediate, opening an ever larger and insurmountable gap within the FTRE that led to the gradual decrease in the number of affiliates and its dissolution five years later.

Only 64 delegates attended the "Cosmopolitan Congress" meeting in Barcelona in September 1884, while the Andalusian anarcho-communist group of "The Disinherited" held another in Seville three months later, attended by 34 entities, of which 25 were from Andalusia. The Congress held the following year was a complete failure, as was the one held in Madrid between May 15 and 17, 1887, in which only 16 delegates attended.

Between May 18 and 20, 1888, an "expanded" Congress was held in Barcelona, which was not attended by the Andalusian federations already opting for anarcho-communism and "illegalism." The delegates, the vast majority Catalan, and the Federal Committee decided to create the Spanish Federation of Resistance to Capital, better known by the name of the "Union and Solidarity Pact", whose purpose was "to bring together in a common action the resistant force of the Spanish proletariat to direct it against the prevailing capitalism...". To this end, "unconditional support for any strike promoted by workers to safeguard their outraged dignity or to improve their working conditions" was approved, although it was recommended that strikes only be carried out "under favorable conditions." The new organization, according to Tuñón de Lara, "was halfway between anarchism and societarism". However, according to Josep Termes, was rather contrary to societarism, as the following statement would prove: "Understand well, we are talking about spontaneous and natural resistance, not that which presupposes a universal, patient and calculated organization, to get a few more cents in wages or an hour less work... This kind of resistance is as ineffective and impractical as cooperation."

In October 1888 the "Pact" held a Congress in Valencia in which it was decided to dissolve the FTRE, and separate union activity, which would be reserved for the newly created Federation of Resistance to Capital, from revolutionary activity, for which the Anarchist Organization of the Spanish Region was founded, "which was the least organization possible; the commission created had no other function than to act as a liaison. There were no statutes or disciplinary rules." But the new organization disappeared the following year.

== Evaluation ==
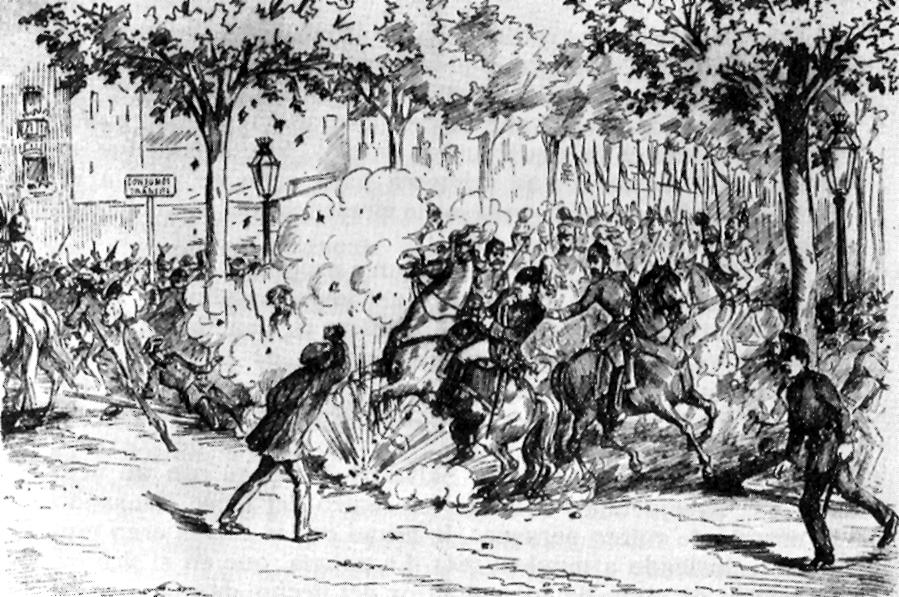
Illustration from a periodical newspaper about the attack against General Martínez Campos (Barcelona, 1893).

According to historian Carlos Dardé, the FTRE was dissolved in 1888 when the anarchist sector prevailed, which criticized the existence of a public, legal organization with a union dimension and which, on the contrary, defended the "spontaneism" — since any type of organization limited individual autonomy and could "distract" its components from the basic objective, the revolution, in addition to promoting their "gentrification" - and the "insurrectionalist" path - the workers' uprising would put an end to capitalist society. Faced with it, the "trade unionist" tendency advocated the strengthening of the organization so that, through strikes and other forms of struggle, it could wrest improvements in wages and working conditions from the employers. The brutal repression unleashed by the government on the Andalusian anarchists as a result of the murders and robberies attributed to the Black Hand, a mysterious and supposed underground anarchist organization that had nothing to do with the FTRE, contributed to the triumph of the "spontaneist" and "insurrectionalist" tendency in 1883.

Although the anarchist movement continued to be present through publications and educational initiatives, with the dissolution of the FRTE, "the way was opened for the predominance of individual actions of a terrorist character, for the propaganda of the deed that would proliferate in the following decade."

== Bibliography ==
- Avilés Farré, Juan (2013). La daga y la dinamita. Los anarquistas y el nacimiento del terrorismo (in Spanish). Barcelona: Tusquets Editores. ISBN 978-84-8383-753-5.
- Dardé, Carlos (1996). La Restauración, 1875-1902. Alfonso XII y la regencia de María Cristina (in Spanish). Madrid: Historia 16-Temas de Hoy. ISBN 84-7679-317-0.
- Lida, Clara E. (2010). "La Primera Internacional en España, entre la organización pública y la clandestinidad (1868-1889)". In Casanova, Julián (ed.). Tierra y Libertad. Cien años de anarquismo en España (in Spanish). Barcelona: Crítica. pp. 33–59. ISBN 978-84-9892-119-9.
- Termes, Josep (1977). Anarquismo y sindicalismo en España. La Primera Internacional (1864-1881) (in Spanish). Barcelona: Crítica. ISBN 84-7423-023-3.
- Termes, Josep (2011). Historia del anarquismo en España (1870-1980) (in Spanish). Barcelona: RBA. ISBN 978-84-9006-017-9.
- Tuñón de Lara, Manuel (1977) [1972]. El movimiento obrero en la historia de España. I.1832-1899 (in Spanish) (2ª ed.). Barcelona: Laia. ISBN 84-7222-331-0.
