= Anselmo Lorenzo =

Spanish anarchist author (1841–1914)

Abuelo Anselmo Lorenzo
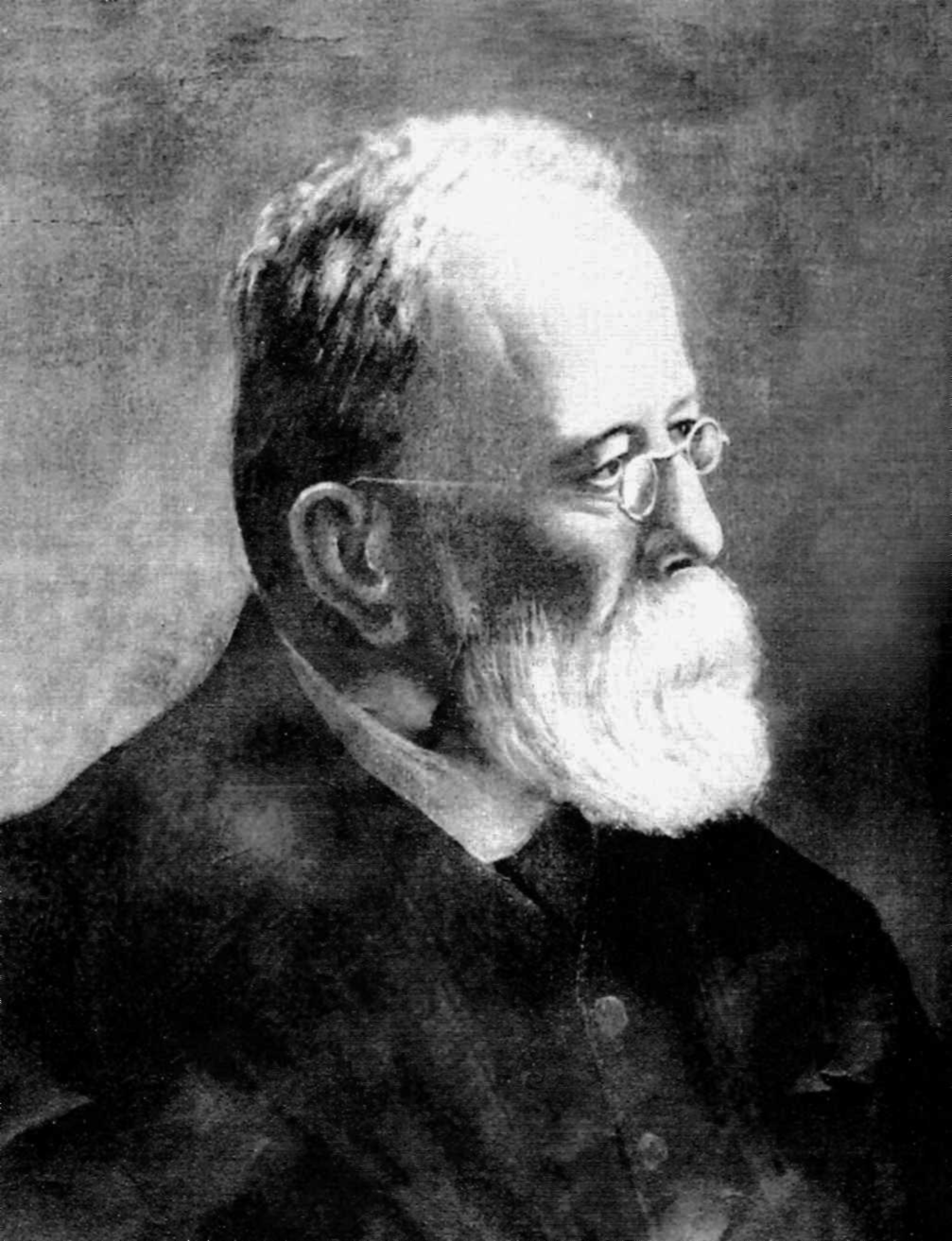
- Born: Anselmo Lorenzo Asperilla; 21 April 1841; Toledo, New Castile, Spain
- Died: 30 November 1914 (aged 73); Barcelona, Catalonia, Spain
- Resting place: Montjuïc Cemetery
- Occupation: Typographer
- Organisations: Spanish Regional Federation of the International Workingmen's Association (1870–1881); National Confederation of Labour (1910–1914)
- Movement: Anarchism in Spain

Anselmo Lorenzo Asperilla (21 April 1841 – 30 November 1914) was a Spanish anarchist activist and writer. He is known for his leading role in the early stages of the Spanish anarchist movement, for which he became known as "the grandfather of Spanish anarchism".

Lorenzo was first exposed to radical politics in the 1860s, when he was introduced to republicanism and federalism. Following the Glorious Revolution of 1868, he became a founding member of the Spanish Regional Federation of the International Workingmen's Association (FRE-AIT) and was elected to its federal council at the 1870 Barcelona Workers' Congress. He was at the centre of a split between the anarchist and Marxist factions of the AIT, which culminated in him resigning as the organisation's general secretary. He then established a number of clandestine cells of the AIT in Andalusia, which became the nuclei for revolutionary activity during the Cantonal Revolution. After the suppression of the revolution, he came into conflict with the AIT's moderate faction of syndicalists, who forced him out of the organisation before reorganising it into the Federation of Workers of the Spanish Region (FTRE).

During the 1880s, Lorenzo turned to writing and became an exponent of the theory of anarchism without adjectives, which advocated for an end to political infighting in the anarchist movement. In 1894, he launched his own newspaper, La Ciencia Social, but it was shut down during the Montjuïc trials and he fled into exile. Following the Spanish defeat in the Spanish-American War, Lorenzo called for anarchists to adopt a new strategy and formulated the tendency of anarcho-syndicalism. He also became involved in the Barcelona Modern School and observed the Tragic Week uprising. In 1910, Lorenzo participated in the foundation of the National Confederation of Labour (CNT), which went on to become the predominant anarchist organisation in Spain. He died following the outbreak of World War I.

== Biography ==
Anselmo Lorenzo Asperilla was born in 1841, in the Castilian city of Toledo, into a working-class family. At a young age, he went to live with his uncle in Madrid, where he went to work as a typographer. He attended events at the Fomento de las Artes cultural centre, where he was introduced to new ideas on progressive politics. Here, Lorenzo became interested in federal republicanism and read the works of Pierre-Joseph Proudhon and Francesc Pi i Margall. In the 1860s, Lorenzo attended a series of lectures by Juan Serrano Oteiza, who first introduced him to the idea of revolution.

=== Leadership of the FRE-AIT ===
Following the Glorious Revolution of 1868, Lorenzo attended a small meeting of federalists organised by the Italian anarchist Giuseppe Fanelli. Fanelli spoke to them in the French and Italian languages, neither of which Lorenzo understood, but he was nevertheless able to follow his expressive and animated speech about the exploitation of labour and revolution. Over the following weeks, Lorenzo continued to attend Fanelli's speeches and have conversations with him, gaining his favour. He would later become a subject of Lorenzo's works, along with Tomás González Morago, considered the first Spanish anarchist.

On 24 January 1869, the small group of painters, printers and shoemakers constituted the Madrid section of the International Workingmen's Association (AIT). Lorenzo attempted to convince Fanelli to stay with them, but he refused, telling Lorenzo that it was up to them to self-organise towards collective action. Their new organisation quickly grew, gaining 2,000 members during its first year of operations and publishing the newspaper La Solidaridad, which Lorenzo co-edited. As the Madrid AIT grew, Lorenzo sought to give it some organisational structure and recruited some Freemasons, who he described as the organisation's "auxiliaries". At the 1870 Barcelona Workers' Congress, delegates from throughout the country established a Spanish Regional Federation of the AIT (FRE-AIT) and elected Lorenzo to its federal council, alongside Morago, Enrique Borrel, Francisco Mora and Ángel Mora. By this time, all of them had already joined Mikhail Bakunin's International Alliance of Socialist Democracy (AIDS), which effectively controlled the new FRE-AIT. Lorenzo was disturbed by the alliance between anarchists and reformists in the Barcelona section of the FRE, and believed it would have been better if the AIDS had educated the trade unionists on how to obtain agreements through collective direct action.

Following the rise of Amadeo of Savoy to the Spanish throne in December 1870, AIT members were increasingly targeted for political repression by the new government. In June 1871, Lorenzo and Morago fled the country and took refuge in Lisbon, taking the records of the FRE-AIT with them. In the Portuguese capital, they helped establish a Portuguese Federation of the AIT, before returning to Madrid three months later. During their brief time in exile, divisions began to emerge between the anarchist and the Marxist members of the federal council, respectively led by Morago and Mora. The federal council of the FRE-AIT subsequently collapsed and Lorenzo found himself doing most of the organisational work. In September 1871, the Valencia Conference of the FRE-AIT reorganised the fractured federation into a decentralised federation of trade unions and regional groups. This caused the organisation to break down into bureaucracy, with Lorenzo estimating that 7,500 people would have been required to staff all its committees and councils. That same month, Lorenzo travelled to London for an AIT conference, where he met Karl Marx and witnessed the first signs of a coming split between the anarchists and Marxists. When he returned to Spain, he failed to inform the FRE what was happening in the AIT, which allowed the French Marxist Paul Lafargue to begin inculcating the FRE-AIT with Marxist doctrine. Lafargue established a Marxist grouping within the Madrid section of the FRE, which attracted printworkers such as Pablo Iglesias, José Mesa and briefly Lorenzo himself. Together they used the newspaper La Emancipación to advocate for Marxism in the Spanish labour movement.

In April 1872, the FRE-AIT held its Zaragoza Congress, where delegates made attempts to mend the divide between the anarchists and Marxists, and elected Lorenzo as the general secretary of a new federal council. In the weeks after the congress, internal conflict between the two factions quickly resumed. Lorenzo came to believe that the AIDS had failed to organise the working class towards collective action, as Spanish workers did not yet have experience in mass organisation. Other anarchists on the federal council became suspicious of Lorenzo, due to his friendship with Paul Lafargue. When they went through Lorenzo's mail and questioned him about his allegiances, he resigned from the federal council. Despite this, he remained an anarchist and a member of the FRE-AIT. Later that spring, the federal council dispatched Lorenzo to Andalusia to establish clandestine cells of the organisation that could carry out an insurrection against the state and resist political repression. If they were to carry out a successful insurrection, Lorenzo directed them to establish revolutionary juntas, which he said should exclude "bourgeois elements" such as the liberals and federalists if it were possible. He reported back that the FRE-AIT had experienced rapid growth in the region, with viable groups having been established Cádiz, Carmona, Jerez, Málaga and Seville, and smaller groups in Aguilar and Córdoba. While he was in Seville, AIDS members brought him to the city's prison to meet the incarcerated local anarchist leader Nicolás Alonso Marselau. In 1873, these Andalusian FRE-AIT cells played a small part in the Cantonal rebellion, although this would ultimately be suppressed by the forces of Arsenio Martínez Campos and Manuel Pavía.

=== Repression and divisions ===
Following the suppression of the Cantonal rebellion, over the course of the 1870s, the FRE went into decline due to internal divisions and state repression. It became increasingly difficult to organise strike actions in Spain, which Lorenzo believed was partly due to the strict bureaucratic regulations imposed on FRE sections by the federal council. In the summer of 1875, the political repression in Spain forced Lorenzo into exile in France. He soon returned to Barcelona, where he made contact with the federal council and discussed how they could revive the FRE. He was informed by José García Viñas that the AIDS, which was widely believed to have disappeared after the 1872 Zaragoza Congress, had been resurrected and continued to function clandestinely. Lorenzo discovered that García Viñas himself had sustained it over the years, with Lorenzo later describing him as the "dictator" of the AIDS. He also found that the Catalan anarchists held strong regionalist sentiments and felt discriminated against for being Castilian.

By 1880, political repression against the FRE had calmed and the organisation's more militant members became isolated by a rising syndicalist faction, which argued for the organisation to abandon clandestine revolutionary struggle and reorient itself towards legal trade union activities. When Lorenzo, who opposed this move, was reelected to the federal council by a majority of votes, the syndicalists accused him of election fraud and expelled him from the FRE. In 1881, the FRE-AIT was dissolved and reorganised into the Federation of Workers of the Spanish Region (FTRE), a specifically anarchist organisation with a dominant syndicalist tendency. Lorenzo's expulsion provoked him to briefly retire from political activism, but by 1884, he had returned to a leading role in the anarchist movement. In 1886, he began contributing to Antoni Pellicer's weekly newspaper Acracia. He mostly wrote his articles during his spare time, while working full-time at his job. He was one of the few notable Spanish anarchist writers of the time, alongside Joan Montseny and Ricardo Mella. In contrast with Mella, who was a very private person, Lorenzo and Montseny often wrote about their own personal experiences. Lorenzo also mentored the young writer Fernando Tarrida del Marmol, who became a life-long friend. Lorenzo soon adopted Mella and Tarrida's theory of anarchism without adjectives, which called for an end to the ongoing conflict between collectivist and communist anarchists. These currents were respectively represented by the Pact of Union and Solidarity (PUS) and the Anarchist Organisation of the Spanish Region (OARE), which replaced the FTRE in 1888.

In 1894, Lorenzo launched the weekly newspaper La Ciencia Social, which took contributions from the French anarchists Augustin Hamon and Fernand Pelloutier, and the Spanish journalists Miguel de Unamuno and Pedro Dorado. Following the 1896 Barcelona Corpus Christi procession bombing, the authorities shut down La Ciencia Social and imprisoned Lorenzo as part of the Montjuïc trials. He was chained together with Tarrida, who managed to get word out about their treatment. The repression of the Montjuïc trials culminated in the disollution of the PUS and OARE, and forced Lorenzo himself to flee into exile. Lorenzo made his way to Paris, where he, along with Tarrida and Montseny, contributed to the newspaper La Campaña, edited by Luis Bonafoux. Lorenzo also met the anarchist educator Francesc Ferrer, whose philosophical anarchism was strongly influenced by Lorenzo.

=== Role in the anarchist revival ===
Following the collapse of the Spanish Empire after its defeat in the Spanish–American War, anarchism in Spain experienced a revival, with the Generation of '98 introducing the tendency of individualist anarchism to the movement. Lorenzo, along with Ricardo Mella and Josep Prat, considered the individualist tendency to be an illegitimate interpretation of anarchism. In a challenge to this new tendency, Lorenzo and Prat sought to formulate a "workable strategy for direct action". Together they synthesised anarchist philosophy with revolutionary syndicalist practice, establishing the tendency of anarcho-syndicalism in Spain. In September 1901, Ferrer established the Barcelona Modern School, where he employed Lorenzo as a translator. Together with Ferrer, Lorenzo edited the anarcho-syndicalist newspaper La Huelga General from 1901 to 1902. He also wrote and published his memoir, El Proletariado Militante, between 1901 and 1903. The Modern School was shut down in the wake of the Morral affair in 1906, when Mateu Morral attempted to assassinate the Spanish royal family; Morral had previously denounced Ferrer and Lorenzo for opposing assassination attempts.

In July 1909, Lorenzo witnessed the Tragic Week uprising in Barcelona. In a letter to Fernando Tarrida del Mármol, he described it as a spontaneous social revolution organised by the working class, and said no political faction had instigated it. The uprising was suppressed and many leading anarchists, including Francesc Ferrer, who had no direct involvement in the uprising, were imprisoned and executed. Over the subsequent year, Lorenzo issued calls for anarchists to participate in the labour movement in the anarchist communist newspaper Tierra y Libertad. This process culminated in October 1910, with the establishment of a new anarchist trade union federation: the National Confederation of Labour (CNT). Over the next four years, the organisation Lorenzo had helped found grew to count almost 15,000 members.

Following the outbreak of World War I, a number of leading anarchists, including Peter Kropotkin, expressed support for the Allied powers. According to Manuel Buenacasa, this defection hastened the decline of Lorenzo's ailing health. Anselmo Lorenzo died on 30 November 1914.

== Legacy ==
For his contribution to the spread of anarchism throughout Spain, particularly in Catalonia and Andalusia, Lorenzo became known as the "grandfather of Spanish anarchism". By the 1920s, the CNT was organising to reduce working hours, inspired by Lorenzo's argument that it would give people "the liberty in which to think, to study, to satisfy their moral instincts." His 1901 memoir, El Proletariado Militante, is considered a classic of the early Spanish anarchist movement and has been used as a key primary source on the history of the FRE-AIT. In his 1978 book The Spanish Anarchists, American historian Murray Bookchin listed Lorenzo alongside Fermín Salvochea and Buenaventura Durruti, as people who he thought "literally personified" aspects of anarchism.

== Selected works ==
- El Proletariado Militante (Barcelona, 1901–1903)
- Vía libre. El Trabajador, su ideal emancipador (Barcelona, 1905)
- El banquete de la vida (Barcelona, 1905)
- Justo Vives. Episodio dramático-social (Buenos Aires, 1914)
- Criterio libertario (Barcelona, 1978)

== Bibliography ==
- Bookchin, Murray (1978) [1977]. The Spanish Anarchists: The Heroic Years, 1868–1936. Harper & Row. ISBN 0-06-090607-3.
- Brenan, Gerald (2014) [1943]. The Spanish Labyrinth: An Account of the Social and Political Background of the Spanish Civil War, Canto Classics Edition (2nd ed.). Cambridge University Press. ISBN 978-1-107-43175-1.
- Esenwein, George Richard (1989). Anarchist Ideology and the Working-class Movement in Spain, 1868-1898. University of California Press. ISBN 0-520-06398-8.
- Roldan-Figueroa, Rady (2009). "Lorenzo, Anselmo (1841-1914)". In Ness, Immanuel (ed.). The International Encyclopedia of Revolution and Protest. p. 1. doi:10.1002/9781405198073.wbierp0923. ISBN 978-1-4051-8464-9.
- Steele, Tom (2007). Knowledge is Power!: The Rise and Fall of European Popular Educational Movements, 1848-1939. Peter Lang. ISBN 978-3-03910-563-2.
- Thomas, Paul (2010) [1980]. Karl Marx and the Anarchists (Reprint ed.). Routledge. ISBN 978-0-415-55602-6.
