= Antoni Pellicer =

Catalan writer and anarchist (1851–1916)

Antoni Pellicer i Paraire
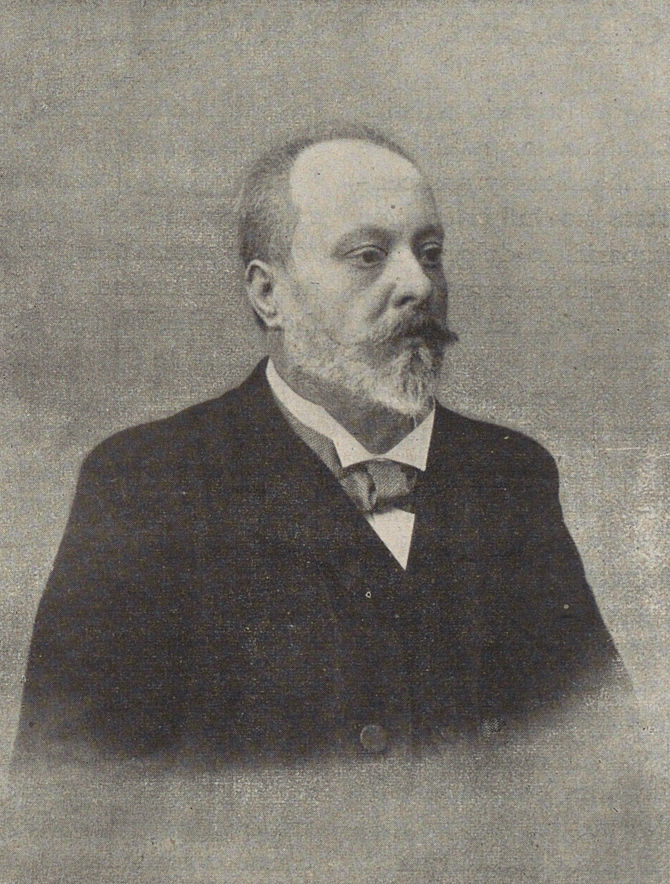
- Born: 23 February 1851; Barcelona, Spain
- Died: 14 April 1916 (aged 65); Buenos Aires, Argentina
- Occupations: Writer, typographer
- Era: Second Industrial Revolution
- Organization(s): FRE-AIT (1870–1881); FTRE (1881–1888); FORA (1901–1915)
- Movement: Anarchism in Spain
- Parents: Ramon Pellicer i Padrol (father); Antònia Peraire i Balart (mother)
- Relatives: Josep Lluís Pellicer i Fenyé (uncle); Rafael Farga i Pellicer (cousin)

Antoni Pellicer i Paraire (1851–1916) was a Catalan writer, typographer and anarchist activist.

== Biography ==
Antoni Pellicer was born on 23 February 1851 in Barcelona, the son of shoemaker Ramon Pellicer i Padrol, from Reus; and his wife, Antònia Peraire i Balart, from Balaguer. Having apprenticed as a typesetter, he worked as a printer throughout his life. Through the trade, which tended towards anti-industrialism and independence, Pellicer learned about anarchist thought, such as the philosophy of Mikhail Bakunin. His extended family met Bakunin and became some of the first Spanish anarchists.

In 1869, he was appointed secretary of the Barcelona Noògrafs Union. Between 1871 and 1875, he lived in Mexico, Cuba and the United States. Back in Barcelona in 1879, he participated in the foundation of the Typographic Society, but within two years, he had split from the society and established La Solidària. In September 1881, he assisted in the constitution of the Federation of Workers of the Spanish Region (FTRE), of which he was part of the federal commission. In 1882, he attended the Seville Congress of the FTRE as a member of the federal commission, siding with the Catalan collectivist anarchists around his cousin Rafael Farga i Pellicer.

As a writer, he wrote a number workerist theater plays in Catalan language: En lo ball, Celos, Jo vaig, La mort de la proletaria and Sense Esperança. He also co-wrote the play Garibaldi. Historia liberal del siglo XIX and wrote Conferencias populares sobre sociología.

From 1886 to 1888, he directed the weekly Acracia. From this publication, Pellicer formulated a perspective on anarchism that rejected any qualifying labels and respected a diversity of economic theories. This was developed into the theory of anarchism without adjectives by Anselmo Lorenzo.

In 1891, he emigrated to Buenos Aires, where he directed a professional magazine entitled Éxito Gráfico and was president of the Argentine Institute of Graphic Arts. In Argentina, he played an important role in the organization of the regional anarcho-syndicalist movement, specifically in the Argentine Regional Workers' Federation (FORA). There he also advocated for Argentine workers ought to reject dogmatism and embrace "anarchism without adjectives".

He died in Buenos Aires, in 1916.

== Bibliography ==
- Baer, James A. (2015). Anarchist Immigrants in Spain and Argentina. University of Illinois Press. ISBN 978-0-252-09697-6.
- Esenwein, George Richard (1989). "Anarquismo sin adjectivos". Anarchist Ideology and the Working-class Movement in Spain, 1868-1898. University of California Press. pp. 134–154. ISBN 978-0520063983.
- Iñiguez, Miguel; Gómez Perín, Juan (2001). Esbozo de una enciclopedia histórica del anarquismo español (in Spanish). Madrid: Fundación de Estudios Libertarios Anselmo Lorenzo. ISBN 978-84-86864-45-3. OCLC 490984440.
- Zaragoza, G. (1978). "Antoni Pellicer i Paraire i l'anarquisme argentí". Recerques (in Catalan) (7): 99–115. ISSN 0210-380X.
