= Barcelona Workers' Congress =

The Barcelona Workers' Congress may refer to:

- Barcelona Workers' Congress of 1865
- Barcelona Workers' Congress of 1868
- Barcelona Workers' Congress of 1870
- Barcelona Workers' Congress of 1881
- Barcelona Workers' Congress of 1888
