= La Federación =

Periodical published in Barcelona, 1869–1874

- Type: Weekly newspaper
- Publisher: Spanish Regional Federation of the IWA
- Editor: Rafael Farga i Pellicer
- Founded: 1 August 1869
- Ceased publication: 3 January 1874
- Political alignment: Federal republicanism, Socialism, Anarchism
- Language: Spanish
- City: Barcelona
- Country: Spain
- Sister newspapers: La Solidaridad
- ISSN: 2604-2983
- OCLC number: 1201058064
- Website: https://arca.bnc.cat/arcabib_pro/ca/consulta/registro.do?id=2189

La Federación (English: The Federation) was a periodical publication published in Barcelona during the Sexenio Democrático.

== History ==
The newspaper arose from a group of people originally linked to federal republicanism, who promoted it based on an agreement at the 1868 Barcelona Workers' Congress to create a press organ of the Federal Center of Workers' Societies of Catalonia. Its first issue appeared on 1 August 1869, presenting itself as a weekly publication, which would appear every Sunday. From 23 July 1870, it became the organ of the Barcelona federation of the International Workingmen's Association (IWA) and had a socialist ideology, close to the thought of the Russian anarchist Mikhail Bakunin, whose ideas the paper diffused throughout Spain, in addition to publishing texts by Pierre-Joseph Proudhon. It reached 229 numbers — the last one appeared on 3 January 1874 — and included authors such as Rafael Farga i Pellicer, Gaspar Sentiñón, José García Viñas, Trinidad Soriano, Emili Hugas and Teobaldo Nieva.

Publication of La Federación was suspended following Manuel Pavia's coup by the dictatorial government of Francisco Serrano, due to the ideological stance of the weekly against the political and social system of the time. Between May and June 1872, the paper was briefly replaced by El Trabajo, which was subtitled Periódico socialista.

== Bibliography ==
- Abelló i Güell, Teresa (2010). "Anarchism in the Catalan-speaking countries: between syndicalism and propaganda (1868-1931)". Catalan Historical Review (3): 87–102. ISSN 2013-4088.
- Cazottes, Gisèle; Rubio Cremades, Enrique (1997). "El auge de la prensa periódica". In Víctor García de la Concha (dir.); Guillermo Carnero (coord.) (eds.). Historia de la Literatura española. Siglo XIX (I) (in Spanish). Vol. 8. Madrid: Espasa Calpe. pp. 43–59.
- Gabriel Sirvent, Pere (2001). "Anarquismo y anarcosindicalismo en la España del siglo XIX". In Ortiz Heras, Manuel; Ruiz González, David; Sánchez Sánchez, Isidro (eds.). Movimientos sociales y Estado en la España contemporánea (in Spanish). Cuenca: Universidad de Castilla-La Mancha. pp. 127–152. ISBN 84-8427-137-4.
- Morales Muñoz, Manuel (1989). "Propaganda doctrinal y difusión de la prensa internacionalista (1869-1873)". Baética: Estudios de arte, geografía e historia (in Spanish) (12). Universidad de Málaga: 299–314. ISSN 0212-5099.
- Orobon, Marie-Angèle (2001). "La Commune de Paris en Espagne: L'épiphanie prolétarienne". In Aymes, Jean René; Salaün, Serge (eds.). Le métissage culturel en Espagne (in French). Presses Sorbonne Nouvelle. pp. 103–118. ISBN 2878542053.
- Tavera i García, Susanna (1978). "La premsa anarco-sindicalista (1868-1931)". Recerques (in Catalan) (8). Universitat Pompeu Fabra: 85–102. ISSN 2385-4588.
- Tuñón de Lara, Manuel (1977) [1972]. El movimiento obrero en la historia de España. I.1832-1899 (in Spanish) (2ª ed.). Barcelona: Laia. ISBN 84-7222-331-0.
