= La Solidaridad (Madrid) =

- Type: Weekly newspaper
- Founder: Anselmo Lorenzo
- Publisher: Spanish Regional Federation of the IWA
- Founded: January 15, 1870
- Ceased publication: January 21, 1871
- Political alignment: Collectivist anarchism
- Language: Spanish
- City: Madrid
- Country: Spain
- Sister newspapers: La Federación
- OCLC number: 901004297

La Solidaridad (English: The Solidarity) was an anarchist weekly newspaper from Madrid, founded by Anselmo Lorenzo in 1870.

== History ==
It was the first newspaper to defend the International Workingmen's Association (IWA), as the official organ of the Madrid section. It supported collectivist anarchist ideas, disseminated the resolutions, statutes and communiqués of the workers' congresses, and addressed issues related to the labor movement. Its editors and collaborators included Tomás González Morago, Enrique Simancas, Máximo Ambau, Francisco Mora Méndez and Víctor Pagés, in addition to publishing articles by Mikhail Bakunin and Pierre-Joseph Proudhon.

At the beginning of August 1870, La Solidaridad published an article opposed to the Franco-Prussian War entitled The War, which was signed by Pablo Iglesias, a young typographer who had just arrived in Madrid and joined the International.

== Bibliography ==
- Iñiguez, Miguel (2001). Esbozo de una enciclopedia histórica del anarquismo español (in Spanish). Madrid: Fundación de Estudios Libertarios Anselmo Lorenzo. ISBN 9788486864453. OCLC 464995163.
- Tuñón de Lara, Manuel (1977) [1972]. El movimiento obrero en la historia de España (in Spanish). Vol. I. 1832-1899 (2nd ed.). Barcelona: Laia. ISBN 84-7222-331-0. OCLC 802564348.
