= Rafael Farga i Pellicer =

Spanish anarchist (1844–1890)

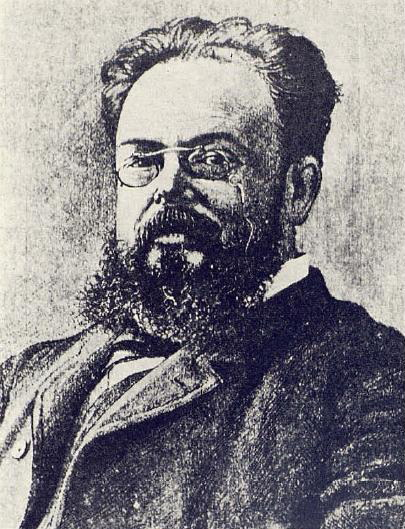
- Rafael Farga i Pellicer c. 1880
- Born: 12 August 1844; Barcelona, Spain
- Died: 14 August 1890 (aged 46); Barcelona, Spain
- Occupation: Typesetter
- Years active: 1868–1888
- Organization(s): FRE-AIT (1870–1881); FRTE (1881–1888)
- Movement: Anarcho-syndicalism

Rafael Farga i Pellicer (12 August 1844 – 12 August 1890) was a Catalan anarcho-syndicalist who led the establishment of the Spanish Regional Federation of the IWA (FRE-AIT). As a print worker, he became involved in the Barcelona workers' movement following the Glorious Revolution of 1868, when he was first introduced to anarchism by the Italian anarchist Giuseppe Fanelli. He then set about organising the Catalan workers' movement along anarchist lines, emphasising decentralisation and federalism, eventually affiliating the FRE-AIT with Mikhail Bakunin's Anti-Authoritarian International. He then came to uphold the precepts of anarcho-syndicalism, overseeing the establishment of the FRE-AIT's successor, the Federation of Workers of the Spanish Region (FTRE). Later in life, he lost interest in syndicalist organising and turned to journalism, penning a series of studies of political figures and movements of the 19th century.

== Biography ==
In the wake of the Glorious Revolution of 1868, workers' societies in Barcelona began organising around the Federal Democratic Republican Party, with the 1868 Barcelona Workers' Congress declaring its support for federal republicanism and cooperative economics. The declarations were openly supported by Rafael Farga i Pellicer, who at that time worked as a printer, and who began writing for the societies' newspaper La Federación. Farga had been influenced by the work of Francesc Pi i Margall, who had been the principal theorist of federalism in Spain.

By this time, the Italian anarchist Giuseppe Fanelli was travelling to Spain in order to establish a Spanish section of the International Workingmen's Association (IWA). In the Catalan capital, Fanelli met Josep Lluís Pellicer, who organised a meeting with a number of his fellow federal republicans. One of the attendees was his nephew Rafael Farga i Pellicer, who was quickly won over to Fanelli's anarchist principles. Together they set about organising a Catalan branch of the International, with Josep Lluís Pellicer as its president and Rafael Farga as its secretary. The internationalist nucleus soon came to include the physician Gaspar Sentiñon, medical student José García Viñas and engineering student Trinidad Soriano.

In May 1869, Farga's nucleus constituted itself as the official Barcelona section of the IWA, adding socialism to its federal republican platform. Before long, Farga and Sentiñon were engaged in active correspondence with the International's leading figure Mikhail Bakunin. In a letter to Bakunin, Farga elaborated the nucleus' strategy to defend socialism in La Federación and advocate for it at future workers' congresses, with the aim of increasing the influence of the international within the city's workers' societies. The strategy was successful, with internationalists being elected to prominent positions within the workers' societies, which subsequently became affiliated officially with the IWA.

In September 1869, Farga and Sentiñon were delegated to attend the IWA's Basel Congress, where they first became aware of the divisions between the Marxists and the anarchists. Although Farga and Sentiñon aligned themselves with Bakunin's anti-political and decentralist program, they were cautious about applying it in Catalonia, where socialism had not yet fully developed and where they wished to "avoid future divisions" over these issues. They joined Bakunin's International Alliance of Socialist Democracy before returning to Spain, where they endeavoured to establish an official Spanish section of the International.

Farga's nucleus went on to participate in the 1870 Barcelona Workers' Congress, which resulted in the establishment of the Spanish Regional Federation of the IWA (FRE-AIT). The Congress was opened by Farga, who declared:

Comrade delegates: those of you who gather here to affirm the great work of the International Workingmen's Association, which contains within itself the complete emancipation of the proletariat and the absolute extirpation of all injustices which have ruled and still rule over the face of the earth; those of you who come to fraternize with the millions of workers, white slaves and black slaves, under the red banner which covers us; dear brothers, in the name of the workers of Barcelona, peace and greetings!

As the congress continued, Farga continued to make explicitly anarchist speeches against capitalism, the state and the church, to the rapturous applause of the attending delegates. He declared that the FRE-AIT's aim to be "to end the rule of the capital, of the state and of the Church by constructing on their ruins Anarchy — the free federation of free associations of workers." With its center in Barcelona, the FRE-AIT quickly extended its influence throughout the country, gaining particular prominence in Andalusia.

Following the expulsion of the anti-authoritarians from the International by the Marxist delegates to the Hague Congress, the Spanish delegates that were due to attend the congress instead went to Switzerland. At the subsequent St. Imier Congress, Farga and his fellow delegate Tomás González Morago decided to formally affiliate the FRE-AIT with Bakunin's Anti-Authoritarian International. On Christmas Day of 1872, they convened the Córdoba Congress in order to reorganize the FRE-AIT along anarchist lines, establishing a more decentralised federation. Within the Anti-Authoritarian International, Farga became associated with the syndicalist wing, which advocated for the general strike as a means to bring about a social revolution that would result in anarchy.

The FRE-AIT subsequently went through a number of years of political repression, after which it became necessary to reorganise. At the 1881 Barcelona Workers' Congress, the FRE-AIT was officially dissolved and replaced by the Federation of Workers of the Spanish Region (FTRE), which took on a staunchly anarcho-syndicalist position. Farga and other veterans of the FRE ensured some continuity between the two organisations. The new organisation's Federal Commission, led by Farga, was composed entirely of syndicalists, including Farga's cousin Antoni Pellicer, as well as Francesc Tomàs, Josep Llunas and Eudald Canivell.

By 1883, Farga had largely lost interest in the activities of the FTRE. He instead began working on a series of literary works, including studies of Giuseppe Garibaldi and classical liberalism, while also working as editor of the journal La Asociación.

== Works and collaborations ==
- Garibaldi. Historia Liberal del Siglo XIX. Ideas, Movimientos y Hombres Importantes. Estudios Filosofico-originales de escritores italianos, franceses y espanoles. Bajo la direccion de Justo Pastor de Pellico. Barcelona, La Academia of Evaristo Ullastres, 1882, 2 vols.
- Prolegómenos de la composición tipográfica. Barcelona: La Academia, 188?
- Biografía de Miguel Bakunin with Miguel Bakunin sus ideales y tácticas & Bakunin's La escuela en el porvenir (The School of the Future). La Coruña, Aurora, (published posthumously c. 1916).
- With Josep Llunas, "La familia; Datos de estadística universal", "¿Qué es anarquía?" y "La cuestión política", in Josep Llunas, Estudios filosófico-sociales. Barcelona, La Academia, 1882.

== See also ==
- International Anarchist Congresses
- Anarchism in Spain

== Bibliography ==
- Bookchin, Murray (1978). The Spanish Anarchists. New York: Harper & Row. ISBN 0-06-090607-3.
- Esenwein, George Richard (1989). Anarchist Ideology and the Working-class Movement in Spain, 1868-1898. University of California Press. ISBN 978-0520063983.
