= Anarchism in Spain =

Anarchism in Spain (Spanish: Anarquismo) has historically gained some support and influence, especially before Francisco Franco's victory in the Spanish Civil War of 1936–1939, when it played an active political role and is considered the end of the golden age of classical anarchism.

There were several variants of anarchism in Spain, namely expropriative anarchism in the period leading up to the conflict, the peasant anarchism in the countryside of Andalusia; urban anarcho-syndicalism in Catalonia, particularly its capital Barcelona; and what is sometimes called "pure" anarchism in other cities such as Zaragoza. However, these were complementary trajectories and had many ideological similarities. Early on, the success of the anarchist movement was sporadic. Anarchists would organize a strike and ranks would swell. Usually, repression by police reduced the numbers again, but at the same time further radicalized many strikers. This cycle helped lead to an era of mutual violence at the beginning of the 20th century in which armed anarchists and pistoleros, armed men paid by company owners, were both responsible for political assassinations.

In the 20th century, this violence began to fade, and the movement gained speed with the rise of anarcho-syndicalism and the creation of the huge anarchist trade union, the Confederación Nacional del Trabajo (CNT). General strikes became common, and large portions of the Spanish working class adopted anarchist ideas. There also emerged a small individualist anarchist movement based on publications such as Iniciales and La Revista Blanca. The Federación Anarquista Ibérica (FAI) was created as a purely anarchist association, with the intention of keeping the CNT focused on the principles of anarchism.

Anarchists played a central role in the fight against Francisco Franco during the Spanish Civil War. At the same time, a far-reaching social revolution spread throughout Spain, where land and factories were collectivized and controlled by the workers. All remaining social reforms ended in 1939 with the victory of Franco, who had thousands of anarchists executed. Resistance to his rule never entirely died, with resilient militants participating in acts of sabotage and other direct action after the war, and making several attempts on the ruler's life. Their legacy remains important to this day, particularly to anarchists who look at their achievements as a historical precedent of anarchism's validity.

== History ==
=== Beginning ===
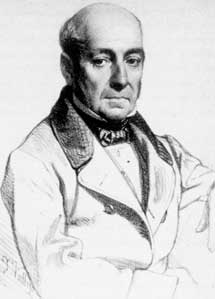
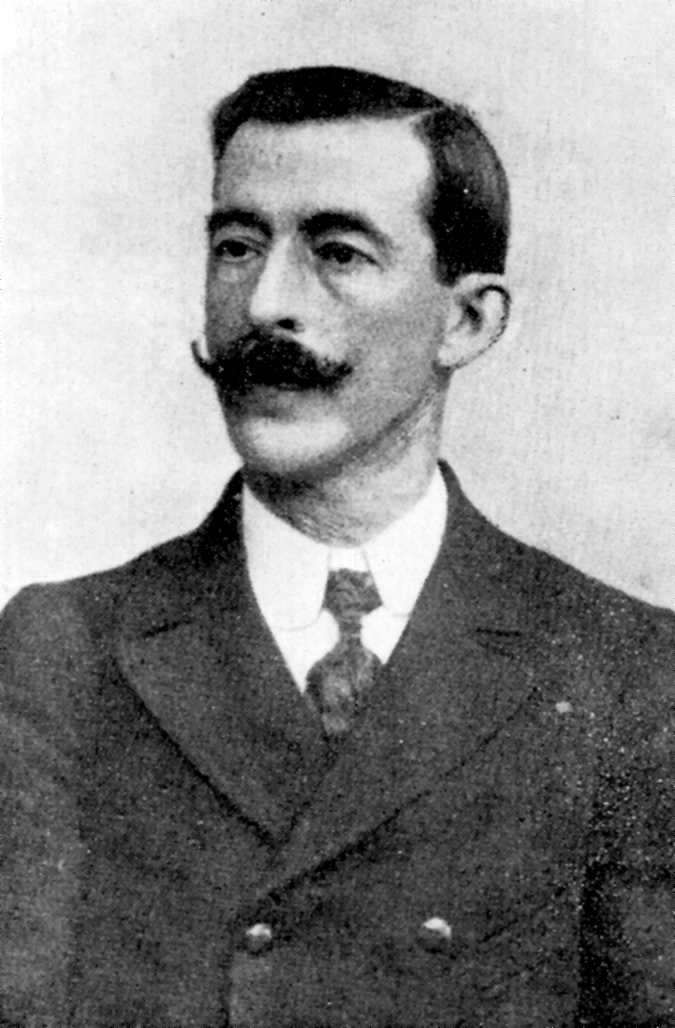
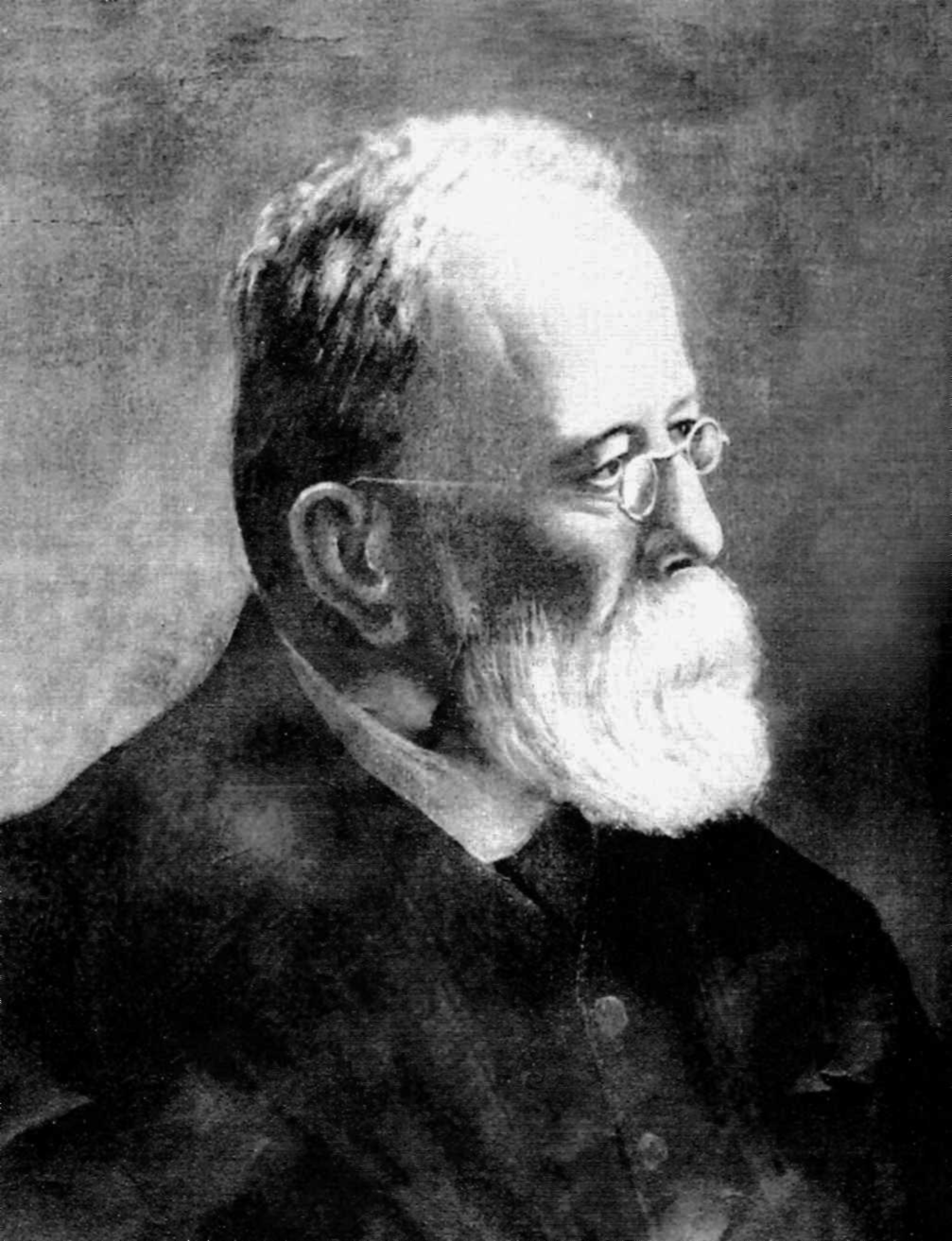
Ramón de la Sagra, Ricardo Mella and Anselmo Lorenzo

The closest thing to a radical movement in 19th century Spain was found amongst the followers of the ideas laid out by the French anarchist Pierre-Joseph Proudhon. Mutualism had a considerable influence on the Spanish cooperativist movement, which advocated for a peaceful and gradualist approach to defeating capitalism, as well as the federalist movement, which envisioned a society of local municipalities joining and coordinating without any need for a centralized government. The most influential proponent of mutualism in Spain was the federal republican Francesc Pi i Margall (named, upon his death, "the wisest of the federalists, almost an anarchist" by anarchist thinker Ricardo Mella), who in his book Reacción y Revolución wrote that "every man who has power over another is a tyrant" and called for the "division and subdivision of power". Another disciple of Proudhon was Ramón de la Sagra, who founded the world's first anarchist journal El Porvenir, which was published for a brief time in Galicia. Mutualism subsequently gained widespread popularity throughout Spain, becoming the dominant tendency within the Spanish federal republican movement by the 1860s. It was around this time that the revolutionary socialist ideas of Mikhail Bakunin, based in collectivism, a focus on direct action and a militant anti-clericalism, also began to rise to prominence in Spain.

The earliest successful attempt to introduce anarchism to the Spanish masses was undertaken by a middle-aged Italian revolutionary named Giuseppe Fanelli. An early partisan of the Young Italy movement, during the Italian Revolution Fanelli had given up his career to participate in the Risorgimento under the command of Giuseppe Garibaldi and Giuseppe Mazzini. After the proclamation of the unified Kingdom of Italy in 1861, Fanelli was elected to the Italian Parliament as part of Mazzini's far-left coalition, before meeting Bakunin and becoming an anarchist.

Following the Glorious Revolution and the beginning of the Sexenio Democrático in 1868, the new Provisional Government declared the right to freedom of association, allowing Spanish workers' societies to begin re-emerging from the secrecy that they had previously lived under. Bakunin took this as an opportunity to sponsor Fanelli on a journey to Spain in order to recruit members for the International Workingmen's Association (IWA), an international organization that aimed to unify groups working for the benefit of the working class. Arriving in Barcelona on a shoestring budget, Fanelli met with and borrowed money from Élie Reclus, in order to finance his trip to Madrid, where he met with the owner of the federal republican newspaper La Igualdad and was put in touch with a group of radical workers.

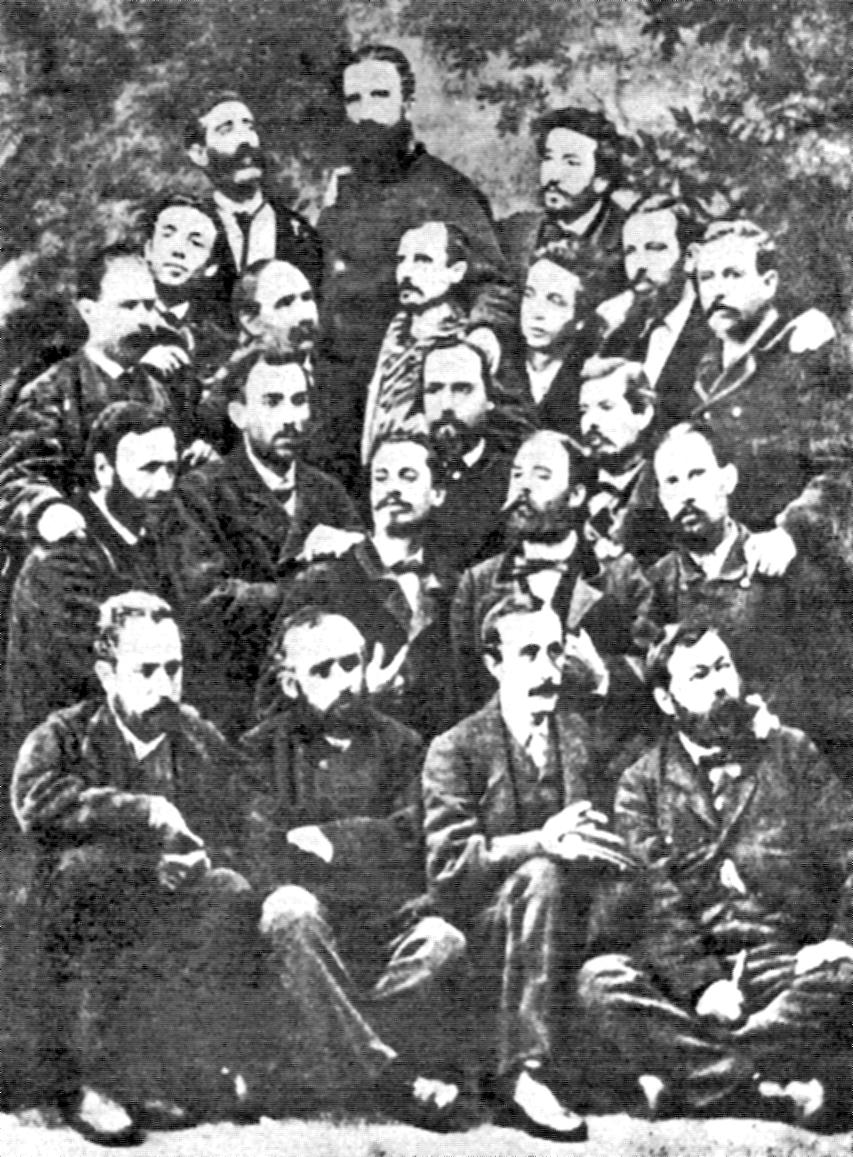
Giuseppe Fanelli and the Spanish internationalist núcleo which was to form the Madrid section of the International Workingmen's Association (IWA).

Fanelli spoke in French and Italian, so those present could only understand bits of what he was saying, except for one man, Tomás González Morago, who knew French. Nevertheless, Fanelli was able to convey his libertarian and anti-capitalist ideas to the audience. Anselmo Lorenzo gave an account of his oratory: "His voice had a metallic tone and was susceptible to all the inflexions appropriate to what he was saying, passing rapidly from accents of anger and menace against tyrants and exploiters to take on those of suffering, regret and consolation...we could understand his expressive mimicry and follow his speech."

As a result, all the workers that were present at the meeting declared themselves in support of the International and Fanelli subsequently extended his stay in the city, holding "propaganda sessions" with the nascent anarchist adherents - paying particular attention to Anselmo Lorenzo. On January 24, 1869, Fanelli held his last meeting with the anarchist workers of Madrid, in which they declared the establishment of the Madrid section of the IWA. Fanelli explained his decision to leave Spain was so that the anarchists there could develop themselves and their groups "by their own efforts, with their own values," in order to maintain spontaneity, plurality and individuality within the workers' movement. The anarchists of the Madrid section subsequently began to spread their ideas by holding meetings, giving speeches, and publishing their newspaper La Solidaridad. By 1870, the Madrid chapter of the International had gained roughly 2,000 members.

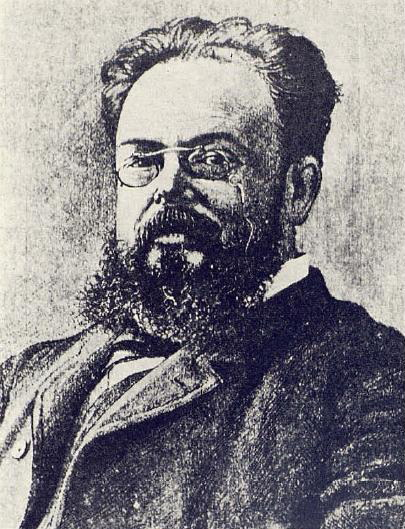
Rafael Farga i Pellicer, early leader of the Catalan anarchist movement and the Spanish Regional Federation of the IWA

Fanelli then returned to Barcelona where he held another meeting, attracting a number of more radical students such as Rafael Farga i Pellicer to the idea of anarchism, which subsequently gained a much larger following in Barcelona, already a bastion of proletarian rebellion, Luddism, and trade unionism. In May 1869, Farga i Pellicer spearheaded the establishment of the Barcelona section of the IWA, which began to advocate for socialism within the structures that had already been set up by the 1868 Barcelona Workers' Congress. The IWA's influence was thereby extended to a number of workers' societies and the federal republican newspaper La Federación, quickly bringing thousands of workers under the anarchist banner. Farga i Pellicer even went on to participate in the International's Basel Congress as a delegate for the Spanish sections, where he joined Bakunin's "International Alliance of Socialist Democracy".

Anarchism had soon taken root throughout Spain, in villages and in cities, and in scores of autonomous organizations. Many of the rural pueblos were already anarchic in structure prior to the spread of "anarchist" ideas. In February 1870, the Madrid section of the IWA published in La Solidaridad a call for all Spanish sections to convene a national workers' congress, which was eventually decided would be held in Barcelona.

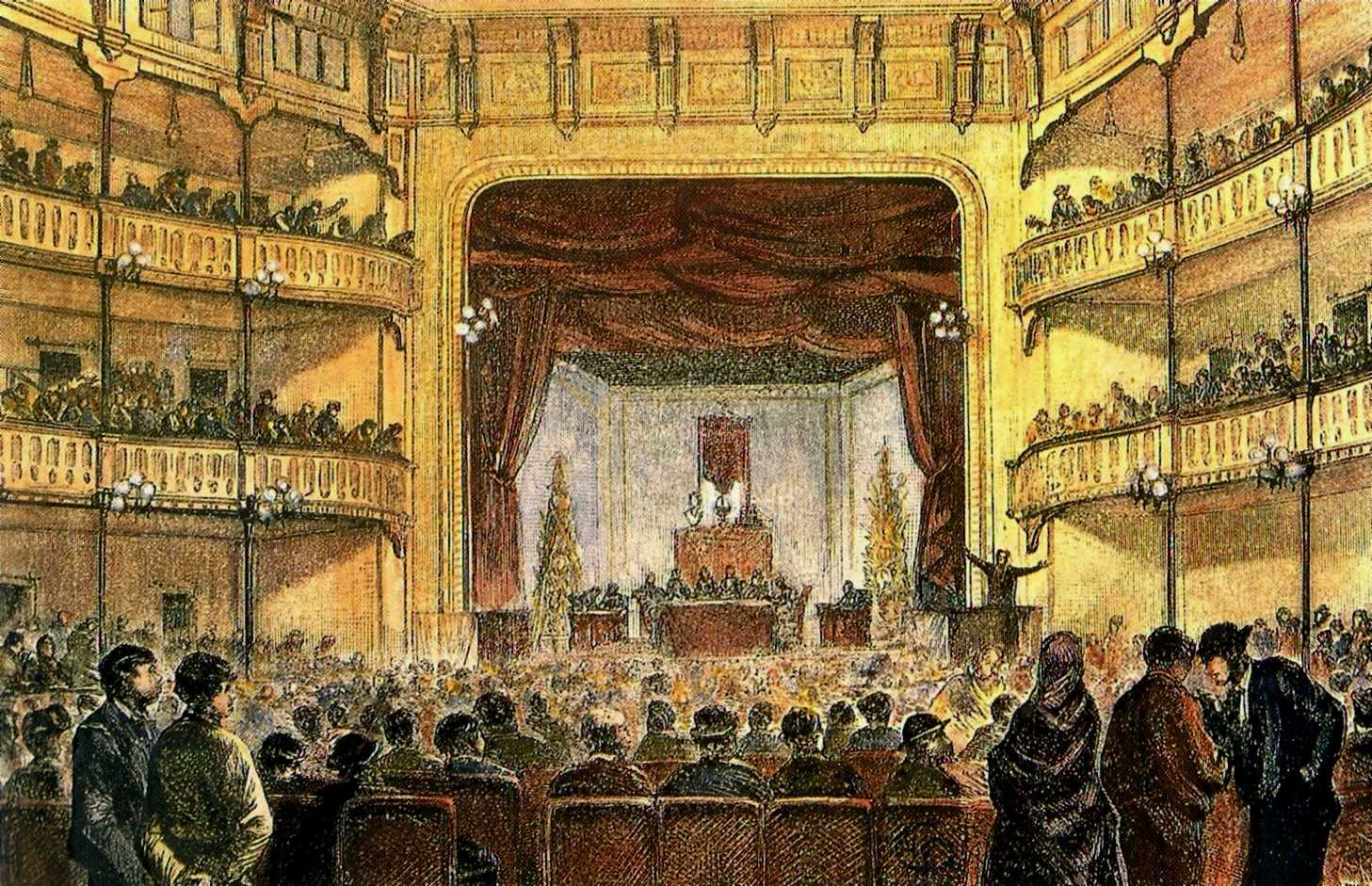
An etching of the 1870 Barcelona Workers' Congress

On June 18, 1870, the First Spanish Workers' Congress convened at the Teatro Circo Barcelonés, where delegates from 150 workers' associations met, along with thousands of common workers observing ("occupying every seat, filling the hallways, and spilling out beyond the entrance". The agenda was closely guided by the anarchists around Rafael Farga i Pellicer, who opened the congress with a declaration against the state and proposed an distinctly anarchist program for the Spanish Regional Federation of the IWA (Spanish: Federación Regional Española de la Asociación Internacional de Trabajadores, FRE-AIT). Despite the clear dominance of anarchism within the Congress, there also existed three other main tendencies: the "associatarians" that were interested in the cultivation of cooperatives, the "politicians" that wanted to mobilize workers to participate in elections, and the "pure-and-simple" trade unionists that were focused on immediate workplace struggles. There was a particularly sharp conflict between the anarchists, who advocated for abstentionism and direct action, and the "politicians", during which congress took a line of compromise regarding electoralism: allowing individual members to participate in elections if they wished, but also committing itself officially to abstentionism and anti-statism. Congress also adopted a "dual structure" for the FRE-AIT whereby workers would be organized into both trade unions based on their profession and local federations based on their location, which could then federate together from the bottom-up, laying an anti-bureaucratic and decentralist foundation for syndicalism in Spain.

=== Early turmoil of 1873–1900 ===
During the Cantonal rebellion, several independent cantons rose against the First Spanish Republic. Anarchism had a considerable influence in this series of insurrections especially in the Canton of Cartagena, which was the only canton to last more than a few days.

The anarchist idea was propagated by many periodicals like El Socialismo started by Fermín Salvochea. Salvochea is considered one of the earliest pioneers in the propagation and organization along anarchist lines.

=== Rise of the CNT ===
The anarchist movement lacked a stable national organization in its early years. Anarchist Juan Gómez Casas discusses the evolution of anarchist organization before the creation of the CNT: "After a period of dispersion, the Federation of Workers of the Spanish Region disappeared, to be replaced by the Anarchist Organization of the Spanish Region.... This organization then changed, in 1890, into the Solidarity and Assistance Pact, which was itself dissolved in 1896 because of repressive legislation against anarchism and broke into many nuclei and autonomous workers' societies.... The scattered remains of the FRE gave rise to Solidaridad Obrera in 1907, the immediate antecedent of the [CNT]."

=== Prelude to revolution ===
An uprising took place in December 1933. Aside from a prison break in Barcelona, no gains were made by revolutionaries before the police quelled the revolt in Catalonia and most of the rest of the country. Zaragoza saw ephemeral insurrection in the form of street fighting and the occupation of certain buildings.

=== Individualist anarchism ===
Spanish individualist anarchism was influenced by American individualist anarchism but it was mainly connected to the French currents. At the start of the 20th century people such as Dorado Montero, Ricardo Mella, Federico Urales, Mariano Gallardo and J. Elizalde translated French and American individualists. Important in this respect were also magazines such as La Idea Libre, La Revista Blanca, Etica, Iniciales, Al margen, Estudios, and Nosotros. The most influential thinkers there were Max Stirner, Émile Armand and Han Ryner. Just as in France, Esperanto, anationalism, anarcho-naturism and free love were present as philosophies and practices within Spanish individualist anarchist circles. Later Armand and Ryner started publishing in the Spanish individualist press. Armand's concept of amorous camaraderie had an important role in motivating polyamory as realization of the individual.

Historian Xavier Diez wrote on the subject in El anarquismo individualista en España: 1923-1938. Utopia sexual a la prensa anarquista de Catalunya. La revista Ética-Iniciales (1927–1937) deals with free love thought in Iniciales. Diez reports that the Spanish individualist anarchist press was widely read by members of anarcho-communist groups and by members of the anarcho-syndicalist trade union CNT. There were also the cases of prominent individualist anarchists such as Federico Urales and Miguel Giménez Igualada who were members of the CNT and J. Elizalde who was a founding member and first secretary of the Iberian Anarchist Federation.

In the 1930s, Miguel Giménez Igualada edited the individualist anarchist magazine Nosotros, in which many works of Han Ryner and Émile Armand appeared, and also participated in the publishing of another individualist anarchist magazine Al Margen: Publicación quincenal individualista. In his youth he engaged in illegalist activities. Igualada's thought was deeply influenced by Stirner, of which he was the main popularizer in Spain through his writings.

=== Anarchist presence in the Spanish Civil War ===
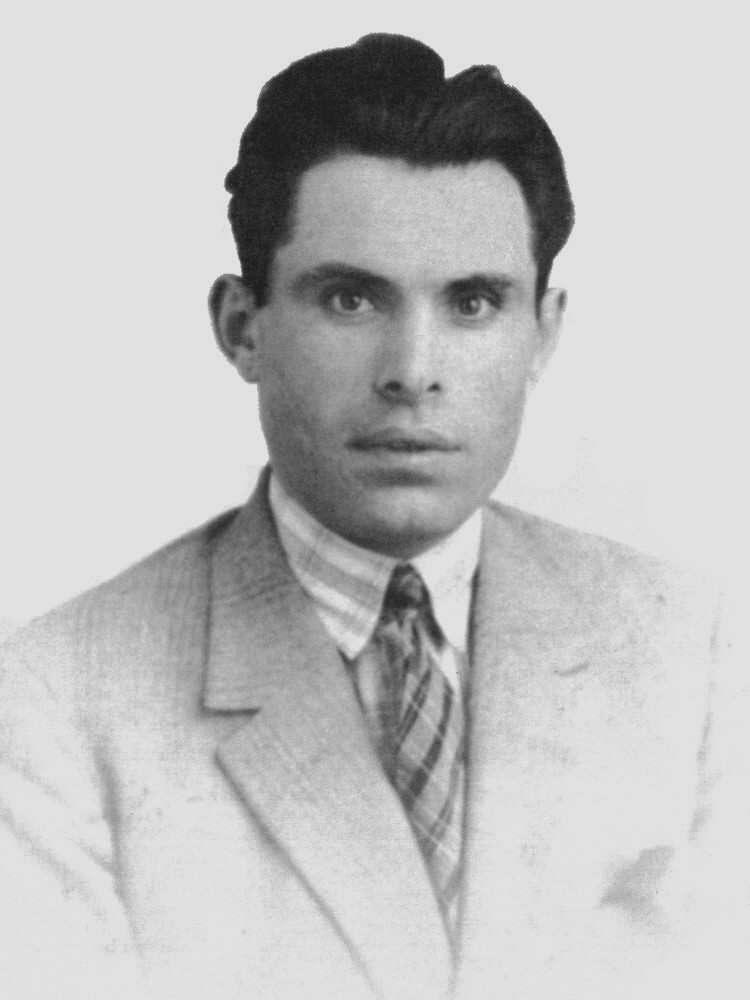
Buenaventura Durruti

The most effective anarchist unit in the Civil War was the Durruti Column, led by militant Buenaventura Durruti. It was the only anarchist unit which managed to gain respect from otherwise fiercely hostile political opponents. In a section of her memoirs which otherwise lambasts the anarchists, Dolores Ibárruri states: "The war developed with minimal participation from the anarchists in its fundamental operations. One exception was Durruti..." (Memorias de Dolores Ibarruri, p. 382). The column began with 3,000 troops, but at its peak was made up of about 8,000 men. They had a difficult time getting arms from a fearful Republican government, so Durruti and his men compensated by seizing unused arms from government stockpiles. Durruti's death on 20 November 1936, weakened the Column in spirit and tactical ability; they were eventually incorporated, by decree, into the regular army. Over a quarter of the population of Barcelona attended Durruti's funeral. It is still uncertain how Durruti died; modern historians tend to agree that it was an accident, perhaps a malfunction with his own gun or a result of friendly fire, but widespread rumors at the time claimed treachery by his men; anarchists tended to claim that he died heroically and was shot by a fascist sniper. Given the widespread repression against anarchists by the Soviets, which included torture and summary executions, it is also possible that it was a USSR plot.

==== CNT–FAI collaboration with government during the war ====
During the Spanish Civil War, many anarchists outside of Spain criticized the CNT leadership for entering into government and compromising with communist elements on the Republican side. Those in Spain felt that this was a temporary adjustment, and that once Franco was defeated, they would continue in their libertarian ways. There was also concern with the growing power of authoritarian communists within the government. Montseny later explained: "At that time we only saw the reality of the situation created for us: the communists in the government and ourselves outside, the manifold possibilities, and all our achievements endangered."

=== Franco years ===
When Francisco Franco took power in 1939, he had tens of thousands of political dissidents executed. The total number of politically motivated killings between 1939 and 1943 is estimated to be around 200,000.

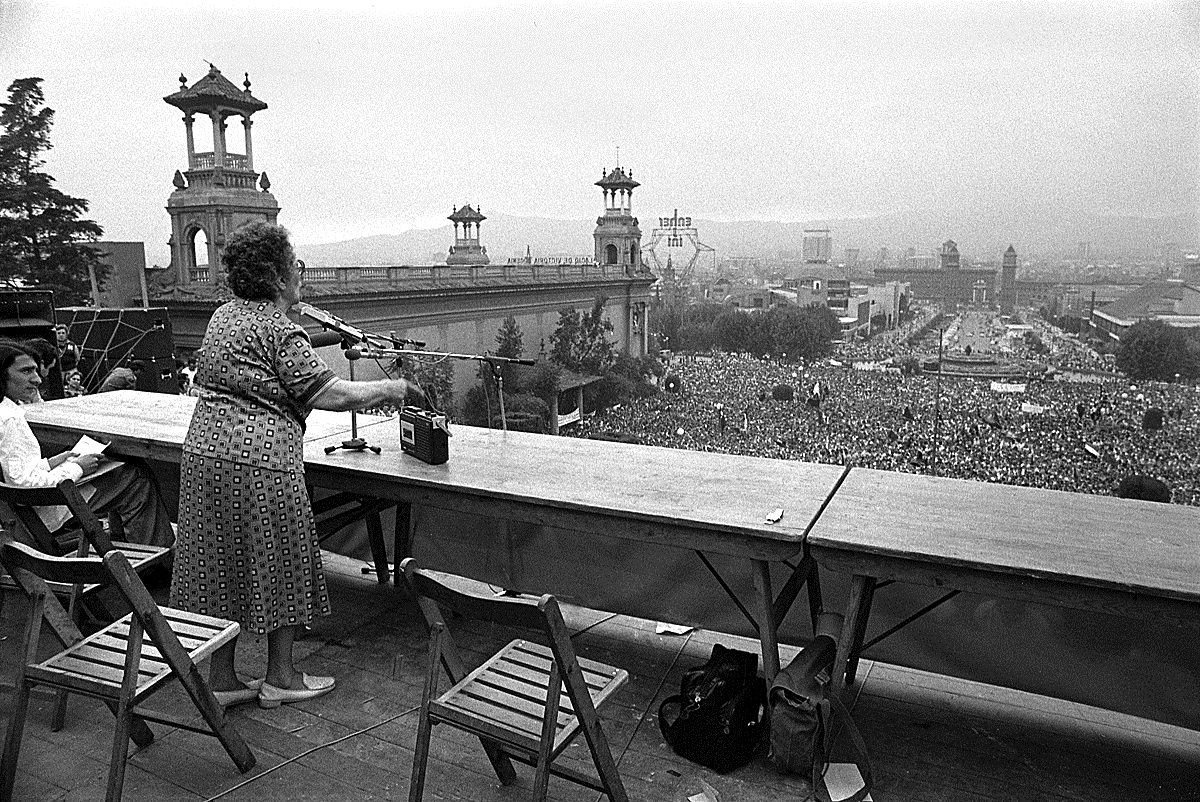
Federica Montseny speaks at the 1977 historical meeting of the CNT in Barcelona, the first one after thirty-six years of dictatorship in Spain

== See also ==
- Category:Spanish anarchists
- List of anarchist movements by region
- La Mano Negra, an alleged violent anarchist secret society operating in Andalusia around 1880
- Vivir la Utopia, a movie about anarchism in Spain by J. Gamero
- Iron Column
- Spanish maquis
- Pistolerismo
- Petroleum Revolution
- Scala case
- Spanish Revolution of 1936
- Squatting in Spain

== Bibliography ==
- Bookchin, Murray (1978). The Spanish Anarchists: The Heroic Years, 1868–1936. New York: Harper & Row. ISBN 0-06-090607-3. OCLC 4604735.
- Díez, Xavier (2001). Utopia sexual a la premsa anarquista de Catalunya: la revista Ética-Iniciales, 1927-1937 (in Catalan). Lleida: Pagès. ISBN 978-84-7935-715-3. OCLC 469334328.
- Díez, Xavier (2006). "La insumisión voluntaria. El anarquismo individualista español durante la dictadura y la segund arepública (1923-1938)". Germinal: Revista de Estudios Libertarios (in Spanish) (1). Madrid: 23–58. ISSN 1886-3019. OCLC 756095520.
- Díez, Xavier (2007). El anarquismo individualista en España 1923-1938. Barcelona: Virus Editorial. ISBN 978-84-96044-87-6. OCLC 914865324.
- Gómez Casas, Juan (1986). Anarchist organisation : the history of the F.A.I. Montréal: Black Rose Books. ISBN 0-920057-40-3.
