= Juan Serrano Oteiza =

Spanish anarchist writer (1837–1886)

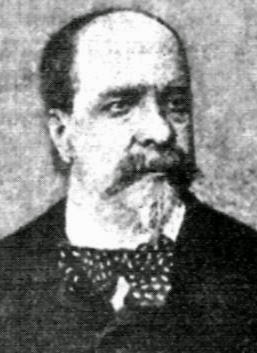
Juan Serrano Oteiza (date unknown)

Juan Serrano Oteiza, or Juan Serrano y Oteyza (6 May 1837, Madrid – 26 March 1886, Madrid) was a Spanish jurist, writer and politician; one of the most prominent anarchists in 19th century Spain.

== Life and career ==
His father taught him the craft of fan making, but he devoted his life to political activism. It is not known if he received any formal legal training. He may have been a notary, but this has not been firmly established.

He began his political involvement with the Federal Democratic Republican Party. Later, he joined "Fomento de las Artes", a center for popular education, becoming its First Secretary and one of its most influential members.

In 1869, under the influence of Giuseppe Fanelli, he became one of the first members of the new provisional section of the First International (AIT) in Madrid, Following the dissolution of that organization in 1873, he and Tomás González Morago established El Orden (The Command), a clandestine journal that was published from 1875 to 1878.

In 1881, the "Federación de Trabajadores de la Región Española" (FTRE), a legal organization, was established. It operated until 1888. Serrano represented Madrid at the group's meetings from 1882 to 1885. From 1881 to 1884, he was also the manager of the Revista Social; considered to be the voice of the FTRE.

In addition to his journalistic work, he was a prolific writer on social and legal issues. His best work is generally considered to be the utopian novel Pensativo (roughly, "Thinkable") which was widely distributed and, in 1885, won first prize at the "Primer Certamen Socialista"; a promotion of the FTRE in Reus. Its narrative involves a group of people who explore and settle an inhospitable valley; transforming it into the "promised paradise" by employing collectivist principles.
