= Josep Lluís Pellicer =

Spanish painter

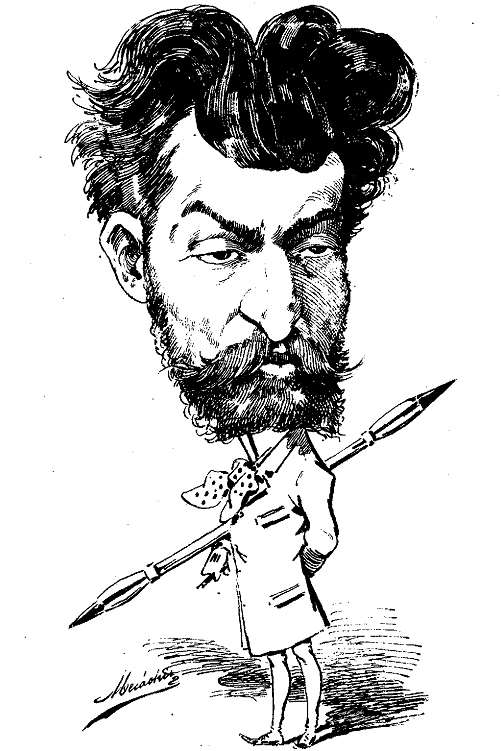
- Caricature by Eduardo Sáenz Hermúa, from Madrid Cómico, 1884
- Born: Josep Lluís Pellicer i Fenyé; 12 May 1842; Barcelona, Catalonia, Spain
- Died: 15 June 1901 (aged 59); Barcelona, Catalonia, Spain
- Education: Ramón Martí Alsina
- Known for: Painter, sketcher, illustrator, caricaturist

Josep Lluís Pellicer i Fenyé (12 May 1842 – 15 June 1901) was a Catalan painter, illustrator and cartoonist.

== Biography ==
He was born in Barcelona, and originally studied to be a surveyor, but switched to studying art with Ramón Martí Alsina, who later became his father-in-law. In 1865, he went to Rome to complete his studies. He combined his painting with drawings designed for publication by the press, including political cartoons, which were often signed with his pseudonym "Nyapus".

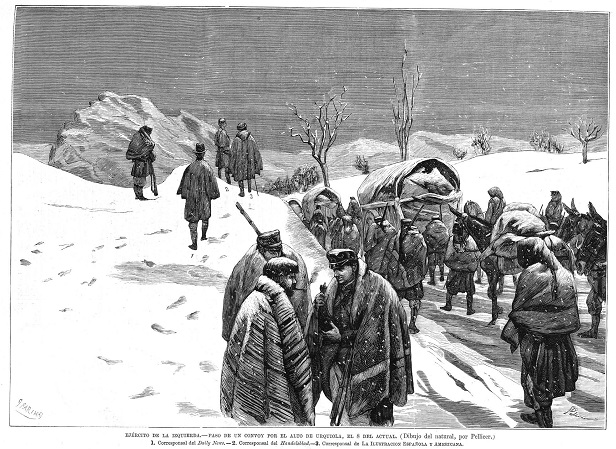
Convoy Crossing the Urquiola Range.

In that regard, he was a supporter of Republican causes and, in 1869, his studio served as a meeting place for high-level organizers from the IWA; a meeting arranged by Pellicer's cousin, Rafael Farga i Pellicer, a prominent anarchist. That same year, he was elected as a City Councillor for Barcelona and was one of the signers of the Tortosa Pact. He was also a pioneer in comics.

His drawings also chronicled the Third Carlist War and, during the Russo-Turkish War, he was a correspondent for La Ilustración Española y Americana, L'Illustration and The Graphic. His work was highly detailed and was often done on the battlefield; sometimes on the front line. He also worked for Le Monde Illustré and L'Esquella de la Torratxa.

As a painter, he won medals during his stay in Rome and at the 1871 exposition in Madrid, where he presented his best-known painting, "Zitto, Silencio...que pasa la ronda" (Shut Up! Silence! The Patrol is Passing!). After helping to organize in the 1888 Barcelona Universal Exposition, he was named Director of the newly created "Museo de Reproducciones".

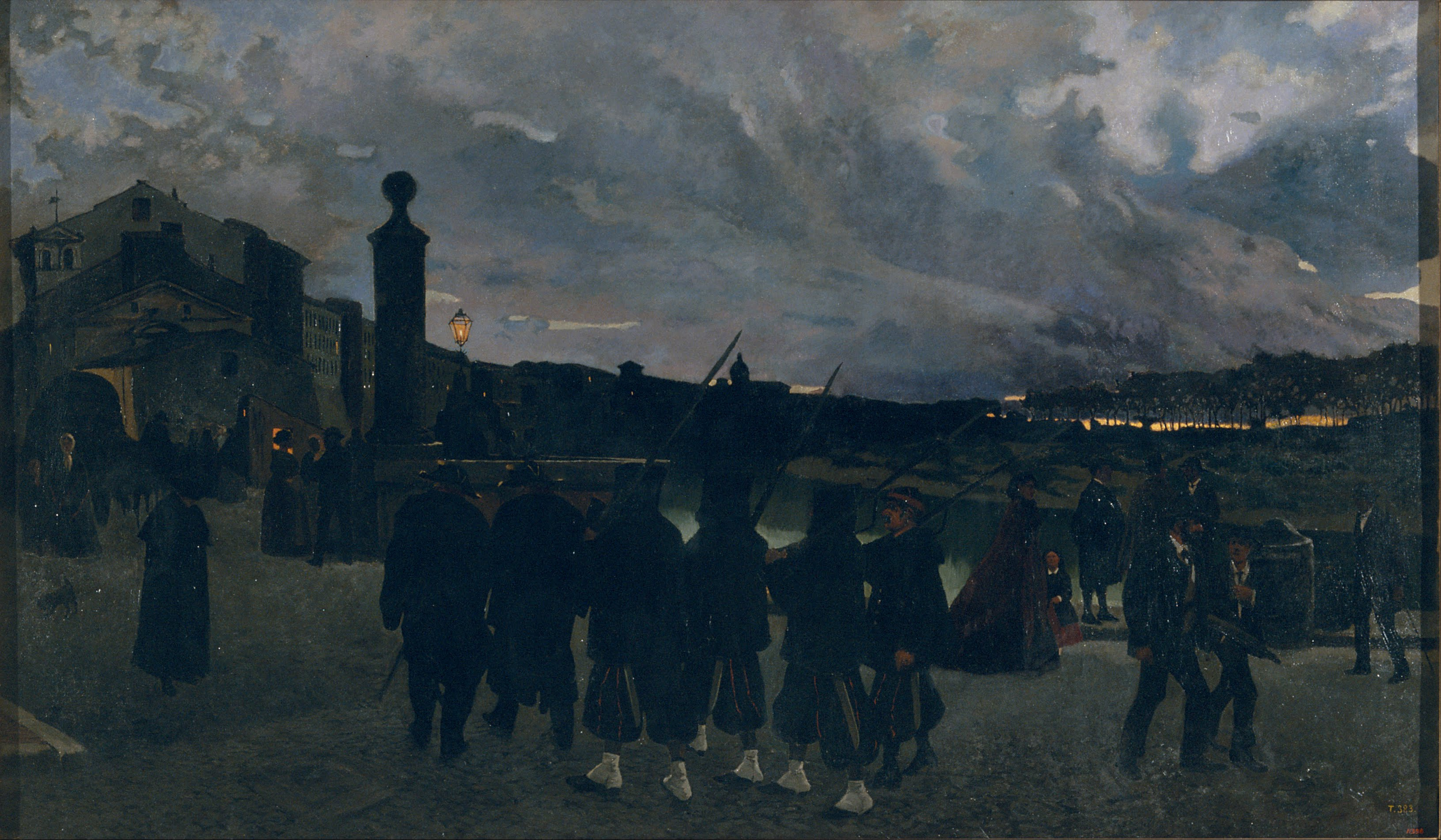
Shut up! Silence! The patrol is passing! (1871)

He was also one of the founders of the "Institut Català de les Arts del Llibre" (a society of illustrators) and twice served as its president. He also wrote articles on various artistic subjects for La Vanguardia, La Renaixensa and the Diari Català, and was the artistic director for "Editorial Montaner i Simón", where he illustrated Don Quixote, The Legend of the Cid by José Zorrilla and some of the Episodios Nacionales by Benito Pérez Galdós.

He served as President of the Reial Cercle Artístic de Barcelona on three occasions and, in 1894, he became a professor at the Reial Acadèmia Catalana de Belles Arts de Sant Jordi, now part of the Faculty of Arts at the University of Barcelona. He died in Barcelona.
