= José García Viñas =

Spanish medical doctor (1848–1931)

- Born: 3 December 1848; Málaga, Andalusia, Spain
- Died: 7 September 1931 (aged 82); Melilla, Morocco, Spain
- Occupation: Medical doctor
- Years active: 1868–1880
- Era: Sexenio Democrático; Restoration
- Organization: FRE-AIT (1870–1881)
- Movement: Anarchism, Illegalism

José García Viñas (3 December 1848 – 7 September 1931) was an Andalusian anarchist, medical doctor, member of the Spanish Regional Federation of the International Workingmen's Association (FRE-AIT, 1870–1881) and of Mikhail Bakunin's International Alliance of Socialist Democracy (1869–1872).

== Biography ==
José García Viñas was born on 3 December 1848 in Málaga. When he was studying medicine in Barcelona, José García Viñas joined the Barcelona nucleus of the International Workingmen's Association, formed at the beginning of 1869 as a result of the trip of the Italian anarchist Giuseppe Fanelli to Spain. He was one of the delegates of the 1870 Barcelona Workers' Congress from which the FRE-AIT emerged and participated in the drafting of several opinions. He adopted the anarchist these and joined the International Alliance of Socialist Democracy. He was also a delegate to the Córdoba Congress of the FRE-AIT held in late 1872 and early 1873. He was also one of the three representatives of the FRE-AIT at the Geneva Congress of the Anarchist International held in September 1873. After the Congress, he traveled to Bern together with the other two Spanish delegates to visit Mikhail Bakunin.

In July 1874, together with Rafael Farga Pellicer, he joined the Federal Commission of the FRE-AIT when it moved from Madrid to Barcelona, at a time when it was operating clandestinely, as the International was banned in January 1874 after the triumph of Manuel Pavía's coup d'état that put an end to the First Spanish Republic. From that moment on, García Viñas, according to Josep Termes, “because of the free time he had as he was not a worker [he was a doctor] and not being tied to a rigorous working day, ended up becoming the axis of the organization and drafting all, or almost all, the projects, reports or resolutions of these years. And for this reason, the documents of the International (in full decomposition, abandoned by the working masses and led by a small sector of the Alliance) have at this time, of forced secrecy, a so clear insurrectionalist nuance, detachment from union work and confidence in the leading role of the secret and minority group". He also assumed the direction of the newspaper La Revista Social, the organ of the FRE-AIT.

In 1876 he translated the Swiss anarchist James Guillaume's pamphlets Ideas on Social Organization and Historical Sketches, of which he wrote the foreword, signing as "D. G. Omblaga, doctor of science." That year he attended the Bern Congress of the Anarchist International as a delegate of the FRE under the pseudonym of "Antonio Sánchez", together with Trinidad Soriano who adopted the name "Francisco Portillo".

At the Verviers Congress of the Anarchist International held in August 1877 he attempted to rebuild the Bakuninist "Alliance" together with Peter Kropotkin and James Guillaume, but the project failed. When Kropotkin visited Barcelona the following year, he was a guest of García Viñas, although he was considered a "Jacobin".

According to Anselmo Lorenzo, during the clandestine years of the FRE-AIT García Viñas behaved like a dictator of the organization and for this reason he described him as an "autocratic anarchist". Guillaume, on his part, considered him "very authoritarian."

When at the end of 1880 the debate on the return to legality of the FRE-AIT was raised in view of the prospect that the new liberal government of Práxedes Mateo Sagasta would recognize the right of association, García Viñas defended illegalism and, as his position was defeated, he left the organization and direction of La Revista Social. According to the historian Juan Avilés Farré, "José García Viñas withdrew from the organization when he considered that a public organization would be counterproductive, because by participating in it, the best militants would make themselves known to the police and would be invalidated for secret action, which he considered the only effective one for revolutionary purposes." Shortly afterwards, he returned to his native Málaga, abandoning anarchist activism.

García Viñas himself explained his withdrawal as follows:

[I saw that a] public and legal organization was going to be created, which I judged pernicious for the objectives of an effective revolutionary action, because it [the public organization] would absorb the activity of the best to the detriment of the secret action, pointing out to the police: because of the fact of being known and the surveillance that would result from this, they would be canceled for the secret action, which I considered then the only effective one to achieve our aspirations ...
After eleven years of activity ... some distrusted me, and considering that, with the public organization, the suspicions of those who sowed distrust with respect to those who were not manual workers, invoking that the emancipation of the workers should be their own work, they should increase.

In 1902, he moved to Melilla, where he practiced medicine, becoming director of a relief center and then of a health center from 1923 to 1927. He died there on 7 September 1931, following the proclamation of the Second Spanish Republic.

== Works ==
- Breves nociones geográficas de Europa y en particular de España (1867)

== Bibliography ==
- Avilés Farré, Juan (2013). La daga y la dinamita. Los anarquistas y el nacimiento del terrorismo (in Spanish). Barcelona: Tusquets Editores. ISBN 978-84-8383-753-5.
- Termes, Josep (1977). Anarquismo y sindicalismo en España. La Primera Internacional (1864-1881) (in Spanish). Barcelona: Crítica. ISBN 84-7423-023-3.
