= Teatro Circo Barcelonés =

Teatro Circo Barcelonés (Catalan: Teatre Circ Barcelonès) was a theater in Barcelona between 1853 and 1944.
