= Legalism (Western philosophy) =

Ethical attitude

Legalism, in the Western sense, is the ethical attitude that holds moral conduct as a matter of rule following. It is an approach to the analysis of legal questions characterized by abstract logical reasoning focusing on the applicable legal text, such as a constitution, legislation, or case law, rather than on the social, economic, or political context. Legalism has occurred both in civil and common law traditions. It underlines both natural law and legal positivism. In its narrower versions, legalism may endorse the notion that the preexisting body of authoritative legal materials already contains a uniquely predetermined right answer to any legal problem that may arise.

Legalism typically also claims that the task of the judge is to ascertain the answer to a legal question by an essentially mechanical process rather than some Schmittian modality of sovereignty.

== See also ==
- Legalism (Chinese philosophy)
- Interpretivism (legal)
- Legal positivism
- Natural law
