= The Spanish Anarchists =

1976 book by Murray Bookchin

- Cover of the first edition
- Author: Murray Bookchin
- Language: English
- Subjects: History of anarchism, anarchism in Spain
- Publisher: Free Life Press
- Publication date: November 1976
- Publication place: United States
- Media type: Print (Hardcover and Paperback)
- Pages: 242
- ISBN: 187317604X

The Spanish Anarchists: The Heroic Years, 1868–1936 is a history of anarchism in Spain prior to its late 1930s civil war and social revolution written by anarchist Murray Bookchin and published in 1976 by Free Life Press.
