= Juan Avilés Farré =

Spanish historian (1950–2023)

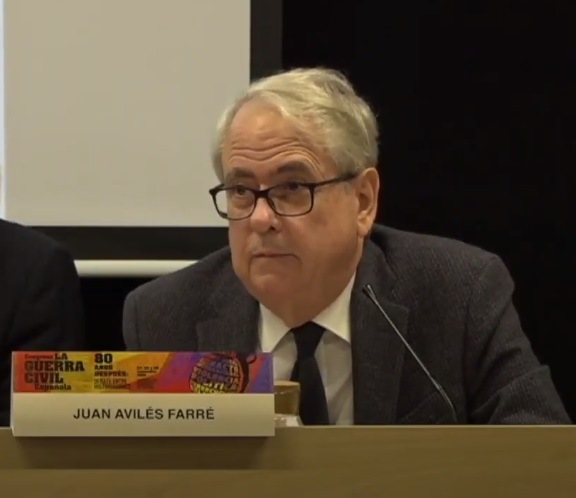
- Avilés in 2019
- Born: 1950; Mataró, Spain
- Died: 14 April 2023 (aged 73)
- Occupation: Historian

Juan Avilés Farré (1950 – 14 April 2023) was a Spanish historian and professor at the Spanish National University of Distance Education.

Avilés was born in Mataró in 1950. He died from cancer on 14 April 2023, at the age of 73.

== Works ==
- Pasión y farsa. Franceses y británicos ante la Guerra Civil Española. Eudema. 1994.
- Las grandes potencias ante la guerra de España. Arco Libros. 1998.
- La fe que vino de Rusia. La revolución bolchevique y los españoles. Biblioteca Neuva. 1999.
- Francisco Ferrer y Guardia. Pedagogo, anarquista y mártir. Marcial Pons. 2006.
- La izquierda burguesa y la tragedia de la II República. Consejería de Educación. 2006.
- La daga y la dinamita. Los anarquistas y el nacimiento del terrorismo. Tusquets. October 2013.
