= Tomás González Morago =

Spanish anarchist

- Born: Madrid, Spain
- Died: 1885; Granada, Spain
- Occupations: Revolutionary, activist, engraver

Philosophical work
- School: Collectivist anarchism

Tomás González Morago (n/a-1885) was a Spanish anarchist. Morago, who was an engraver, was also a prominent member of the labor organization Primera Internacional in Spain. Accounts cite him as the first and greatest of the Spanish anarchist movement.

== Biography ==
González Morago was the son of a Carlist in Andalusia. He became drawn to anarchism due to his religious beliefs. In his view, it realized the teachings of the Gospel. He is recognized for possessing brilliant qualities, prompting peers such as Ericco Malatesta to call him as the greatest Spanish anarchist. However, he was described as unstable, spending days in bed with bouts of depression.

Court documents showed that he was imprisoned by a district court in 1884 for forging bank notes. González Morago died as a young man in a Granada prison in 1885. An account stated that cholera was the cause of his death.

== Works ==
In Madrid, González Morago owned an engraving shop, which also served as location for political meetings. By 1865, he was active in the Casino or Artistic Athenaeum of Madrid. Three years later, he was associated with the Castilian republicanism and became a follower of Emilio Castelar.

Together with the typographer Anselmo Lorenzo and the shoemaker Francisco Mora, González Morago formed the nucleus of Madrid Federation, which was the local section of the Primera Internacional. Morago used the Geneva Alliance (Revolutionary Socialist Alliance) program as the basis for the group's propaganda. He established Solidaridad, the group's publication, on January 15, 1879. This organ published González Morago's manifesto that resulted in the significant expansion of the federation in Spain. In the manifesto, he cited the role of internationalists in exploiting workers. He identified these as individuals who have scant knowledge of the people they exploit but have the capital to benefit from the works of other human beings.

González Morago was expelled from the International on May 30, 1873. This decision was executed by the organization's General Council. González Morago was one of those who wanted to abolish the council after it expelled Mikhail Bakunin and James Guillaume without fair hearing. Bakunin promoted the socialist democratic ideal and opposed the position adopted by the Primera Internacional Council, which was viewed by Spanish symphatizers as Marxists and authoritarian. In a confrontation at the headquarters of the Madrid Federation, González Morago, who also opposed the Marxists theses of the Internacional, countered the arguments of the so-called authoritarians leading to the expulsion of the Marxists by the Madrid Federation. Along with Francesc Tomàs i Oliver, González Morago is considered instrumental in the spread of Bakunin's ideas in the Iberian peninsula.
