= Origins of the labor movement in Spain =

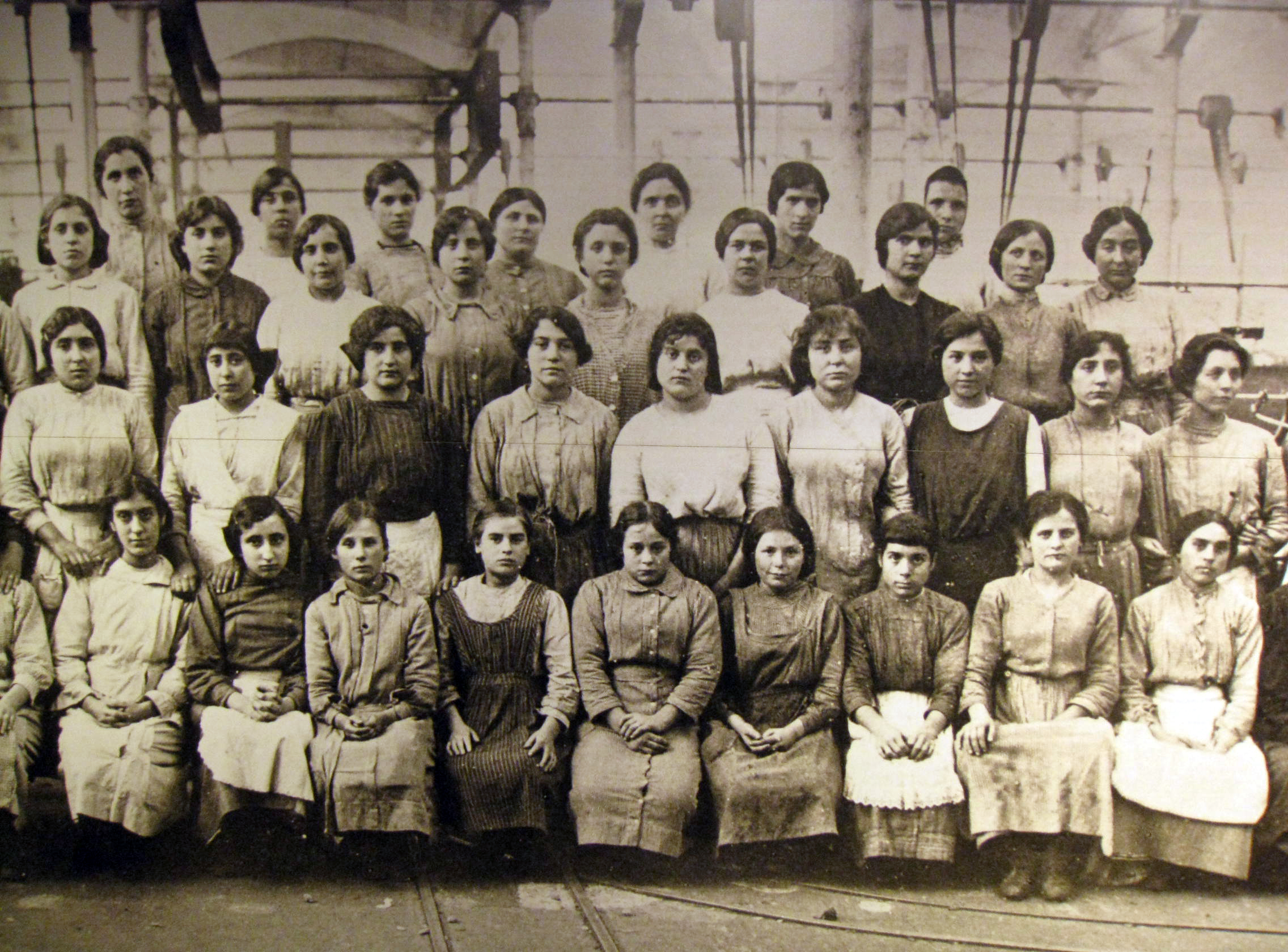
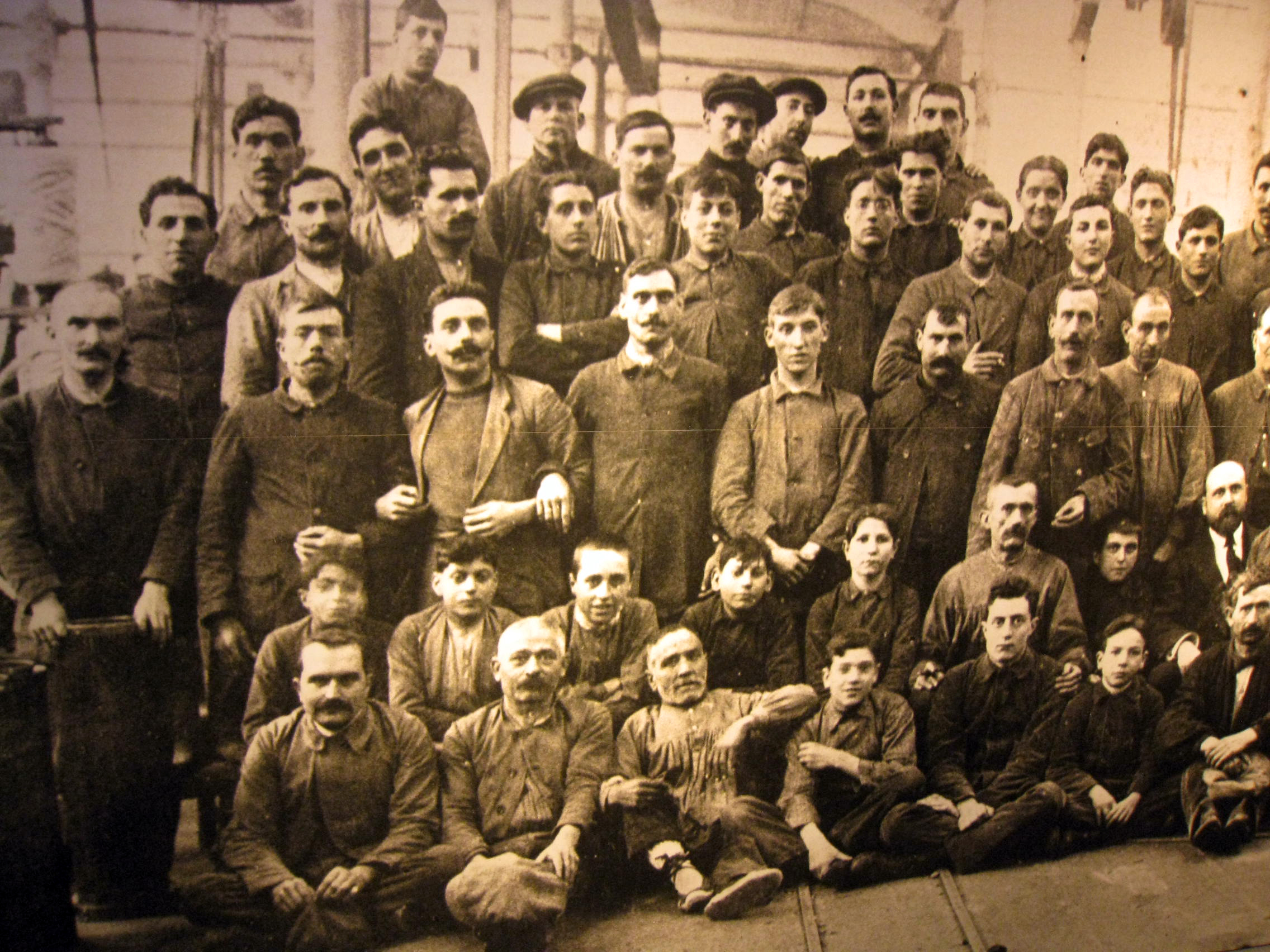
Workers of a Catalan textile factory.

The origins of the labor movement in Spain are located in Catalonia in the 1830s and 1840s, since it was the only place in Spain where there was a modern industry: the textile industry. There the first conflicts between workers and employers took place and there the first trade union — called "resistance societies" at the time — in the history of Spain, the Barcelona Weavers Association, was founded in 1840. The first general strike took place during the progressive biennium - a period of extension of the movement to other areas of Spain. By 1865, the first Workers' Congress was held in Barcelona. After the triumph of the Glorious Revolution, the right to freedom of association was recognized for the first time, which put an end, at least momentarily, to the persecutions and prohibitions that the incipient labor movement had suffered during the previous forty years.

With the formation in Spain of the first two groups of the International Workingmen's Association in 1869, one in Madrid and the other in Barcelona, a new stage in the history of the labor movement in Spain began, during which, as Manuel Tuñón de Lara said: "for the first time class consciousness was expressed at a level where the entire system of relations of production, institutions and values was called into question."

== Last years of the reign of Fernando VII and regency of María Cristina (1821–1840) ==
On March 2, 1821, there was a mutiny at Alcoy, during which 17 wool carding and spinning machines were burned. The rebels, some 1,200 men, also demanded that the remaining machines be dismantled. It was the first sample of Luddism in Spain, one of the first in continental Europe, and marked the first conflict of the new "industrial era". In 1823, several spinning and carding machines were destroyed in Camprodon, which led to the promulgation the following year of a Royal Order to prevent actions of this type.

The first modern labor disputes took place in Catalonia, as it was the only place where a modern industry existed: the textile industry. As early as 1827, workers complained that their employers lengthened the fixed length of the pieces to be woven, which forced the authorities to intervene. The same complaints were repeated in 1831, to which the employers replied that the workers did not have a day off on Mondays and thus they would earn more per week. Again the authority intervened, which set the maximum length of each piece at 35 canas.

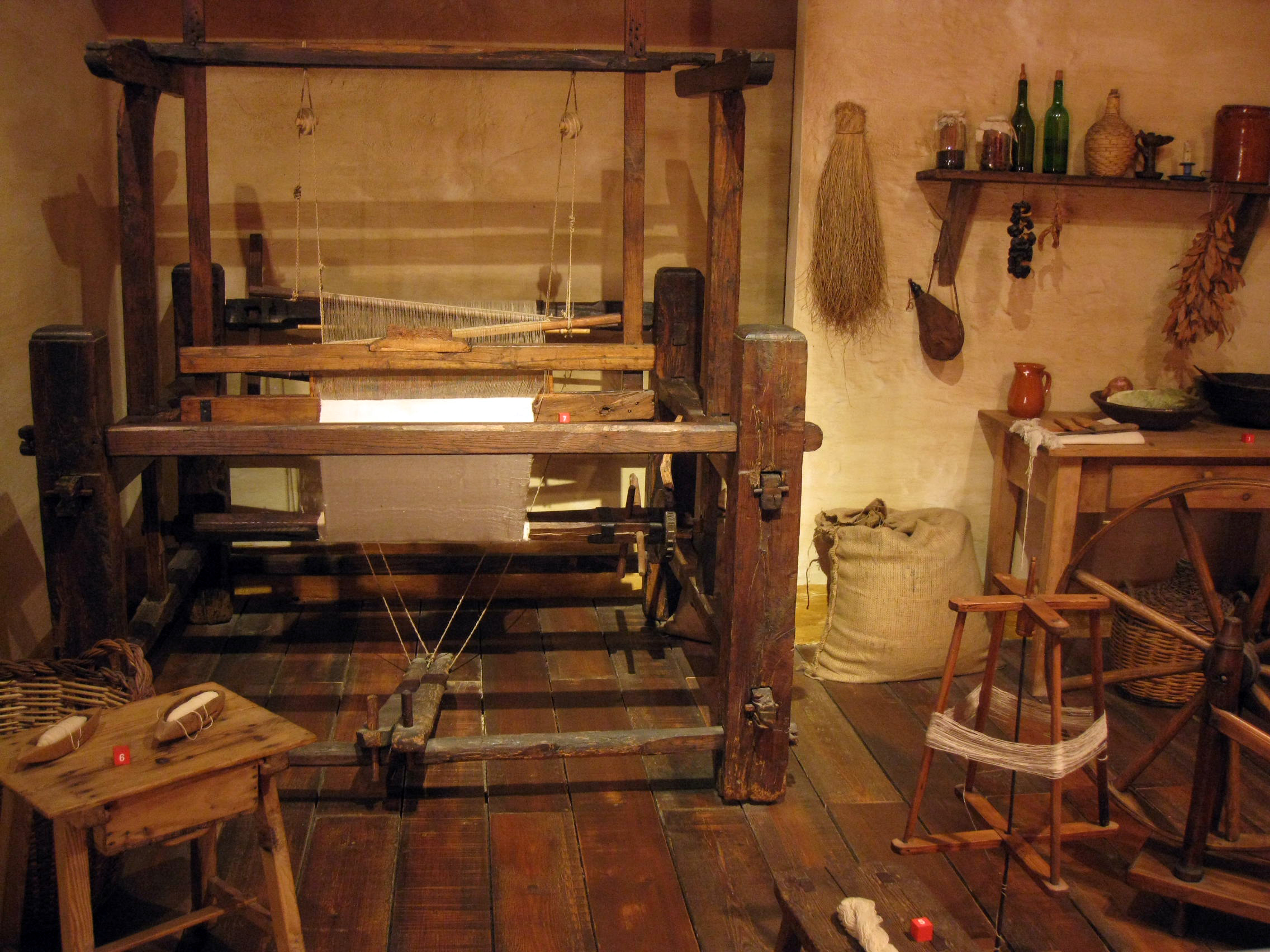
A Catalan manual loom.

In 1834 the workers in the textile sector complained again to the captain general of Catalonia about the employers' practice of lengthening the length of the pieces or reducing their wages. The Factory Commission responded that the workers "loaf", waste time eating sandwiches and drinking wine, in addition to denying that the bosses were cutting wages "at least in general." The captain general brought together two representatives from the Factory Commission and two from the Board of Commerce to recommend that instead of lengthening the length of the pieces when there was a crisis, they reduce the working days per week. The same demand was repeated in 1835 although this time the Board of Trade, after insisting on the principle of "freedom of contract" between the "manufacturer" and the "operator", recognized the low wages and that "indeed, a few manufacturers have demanded greater draft of the current to the fabrics". During the Burning of the Monasteries in July and August, the Bonaplata Factory was burned by the rioters, "convinced that the mechanical looms decreased the production of manual labor," according to the governor, General Pastor. Four workers were shot as alleged perpetrators and many others were sentenced to prison terms. In addition, the civil governor established work bases that included a factory inspection commission to which the workers should direct their complaints, suffering "the penalty of eight days of arrest" for workers who instead of going to it "moved a question in the field, factory or outside of it on the pretext that the manufacturer does not comply with what was ordered" in the work bases, and that if they repeated "they will be expelled from this city as a wayward man and harmful to society, notice will be circulated to all manufacturers so that they do not admit them to their factories, and if their actions give rise to a riot or riot, they will be handed over to the competent court as a disruptor of public order." After the fire at the Bonaplata factory, there were other cases of machine destruction, such as in Sabadell in 1836.

In those years the first attempts to form workers societies took place, as evidenced by the repeated complaints to the Factory Commission by employers against "unruly workers" or "ungrateful workers" and against "a kind of plot to ask for a wage hike" — a reference to what will later be called a strike - which showed according to Manuel Tuñón de Lara, "a new state of consciousness, characterized in that the worker feels the need to associate in order to achieve their labor or salary goals." At first they were temporary in nature with a specific purpose, but the workers' commissions formed to discuss demands with the employers asked the captain general of Catalonia to authorize them to become permanent associations. They also addressed the trustees of the Barcelona City Council. Thus, a commission made up of three workers interviewed them: "They spoke of the ease that the main manufacturers have of being able to join together in a banquet at the inn in Gràcia or elsewhere, due to their small number, dragging their opinion that of others, while the day laborers only needed the largest amount of publicity to understand each other."

== Regency of Espartero (1840–1843) ==
In February 1839 a Royal Order was promulgated authorizing the formation of mutual aid societies and charities and subsequently the Barcelona Weavers Association was established, the first union in Spain.

The Weavers Association spread outside Barcelona, reaching 15,000 members, 7,000 from the capital and 8,000 from the towns of the province, and served as an example for the constitution of companies in other trades, such as spinners and dyers. As Josep Termes has pointed out, from the foundation of the Weavers Association "a social labor movement was born, based on the so-called societies of resistance, which trace the structure of the old trade guilds, but reject their organizational form based on the existence of teachers, officers and apprentices, all of them replaced by the new category of factory and trade worker, who is a salaried worker."

However, the government of Baldomero Espartero prohibited the Association on December 9, 1841 however it was reauthorised "on condition that it was apolitical and local." On January 16, 1843, it was again declared dissolved following the Barcelona uprising in November 1842 and the bombardment of the city but continued to operate clandestinely.

== Moderate Decade (1844–1854) ==
In the following years some mutual aid societies appeared outside of Catalonia, such as so-called "Workshop" of Valencia or the "Mutual Aid Society among Weavers of Béjar". Likewise, workers' cultural associations were founded, such as "La Velada de Artistas, Artesanos, Jornaleros y Labradores", established in Madrid in 1847, which later adopted the name of "Fomento de las Artes" or the popular orfeón composed of workers founded in Barcelona by Anselmo Clavé in 1850. Adult schools were also organized, such as the one founded in Madrid by Antonio Ignacio Rivera, which had 400 students and published a newspaper, El Trabajador — where they published works by Francesc Pi i Margall and Sixto Cámara.

== Progressive biennium (1854–1856) ==
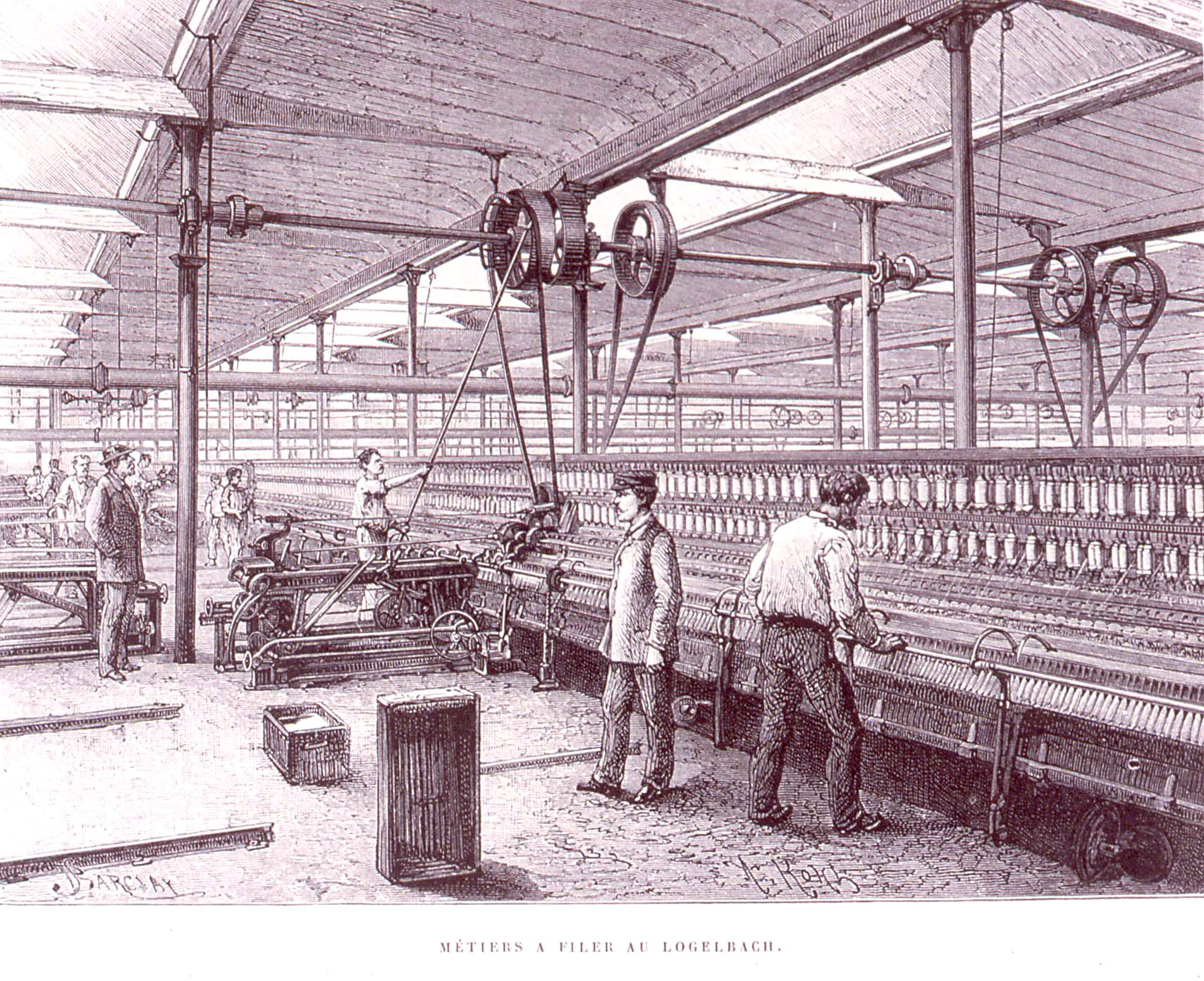
Factory with self-acting spinning machines in Logelbach, France.

On June 30, 1854, the pronouncement known as the Vicalvarada broke out, which began the progressive biennium. The first city to join was Barcelona, where on July 14 an uprising began in which the workers played a prominent role, who for the first time did so by declaring a strike. The outcomes was that the spinners got half an hour more time in the lunch break, which meant reducing the weekly hours from 75 to 72.

There was also an important labor participation in the uprising in Málaga, forcing the civil and military governors to leave the city. A Board elected by universal suffrage was then formed, and the workers went on strike for several days until they achieved the wage increases they were asking for.

The following year, labor unrest grew. On April 30, the civil governor of Barcelona prohibited both the closures of factories by employers and the "collective abandonment of work" by workers, in addition to establishing the requirement of government authorization so that workers' associations could continue to function. Three weeks later, on May 21, a Royal Order on "freedom of contract" annulled what the workers had achieved in the agreements of the previous summer. In this context, on June 6, took place the trial and execution of José Barceló - head of the Barcelona Spinners Association - as "instigator" of a crime committed at Mas de Sant Jaume, near Olesa de Montserrat, the court counting only on the evidence of a last minute statement of one of the perpetrators of the robbery and murder, when he was awaiting execution. On June 21, the captain general Juan Zapatero took the final step in the offensive against the workers' associations by prohibiting them. Eleven days later the first general strike in the history of Spain was declared in Barcelona. As the workers' delegate Juan Alsina said months later: "If Zapatero had not given the order to prohibit associations, the working class would have remained calm in their workshops awaiting the decision of the exhibition that dated May 11 of 1855 he had raised the Government asking for a remedy for his ills."

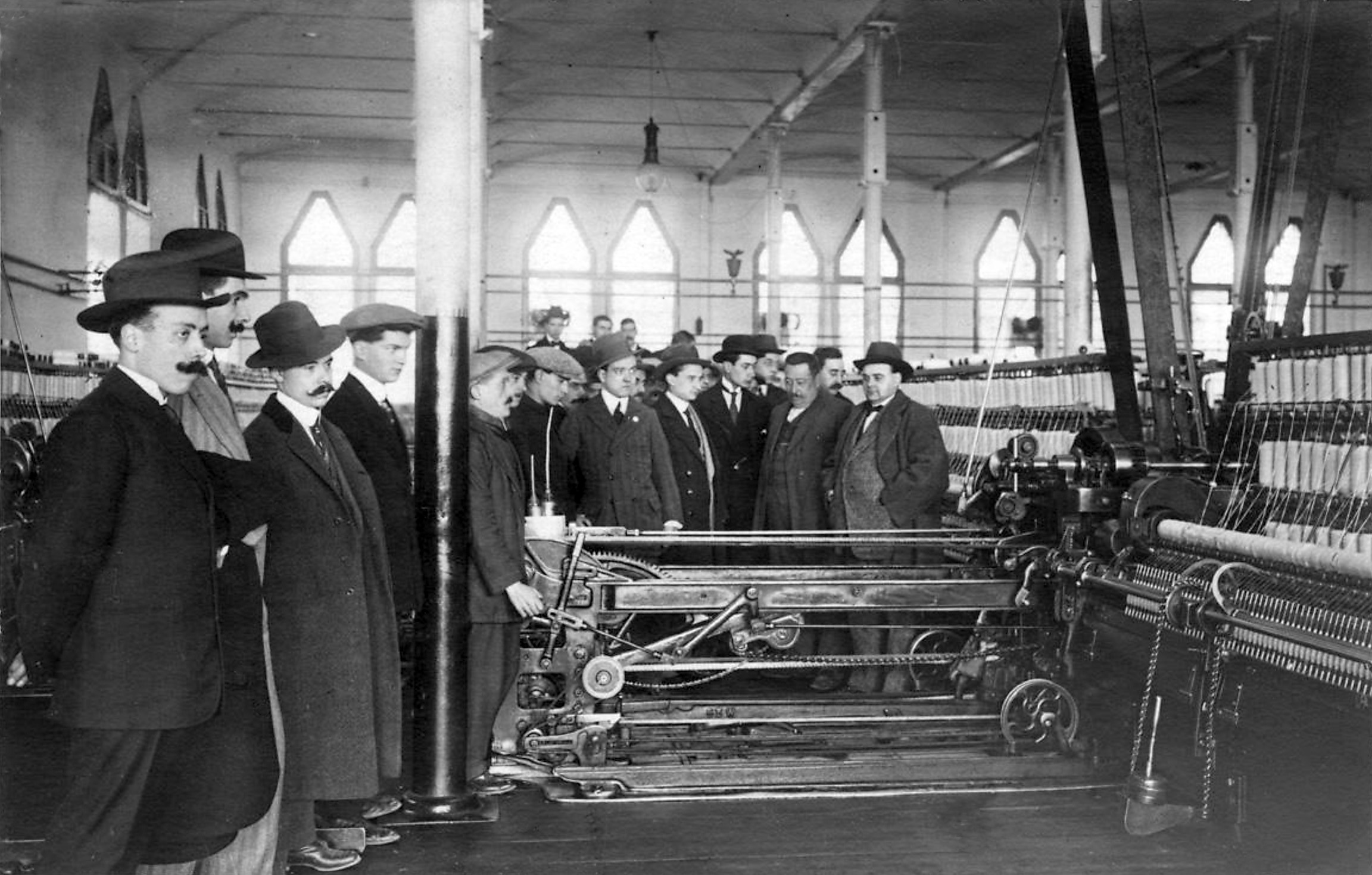
Students viewing a self-acting spinning machine at the Trinxet textile factory in Hospitalet de Llobregat in 1914. AFB3-117

The strike began at lunchtime on July 2, when workers from Barcelona, Gràcia, Badalona, Sants and other towns in the periphery - like Igualada - left the factories. Even the bishop of Vich joined in the calls made by the authorities to return to work: "If in your laborious life you have to subject yourself to some deprivation, religion teaches us resignation and suffering, religion consoles us, promising us more abundant happiness for a life to come, the greater the privations in the present." But the strike continued under the slogan written on a banner: "Long live Espartero! Association or death! Bread and work!"

On July 5, two commissions left for Madrid to meet with the president of the government, Baldomero Espartero, from whom they were going to ask for the recognition of the right of association, the ten-hour day, and the constitution of a jury made up of workers and employers. Espartero received them coldly saying to "the sons of the people, my favorites" that their demands would be met if they put an end to the strike. On July 8, Barcelona began to regain normalcy, by opening part of the business and resuming work in offices and courts. By then the repression had already begun: the frigate "Julia" left for Havana with seventy arrested workers on board. On July 9 there were demonstrations on the Ramblas and Army units took up positions in the working-class neighborhoods. The factories opened but almost no worker returned to work.

Then Colonel Saravia arrived in Barcelona, envoy of General Espartero, who maintained the support of the popular classes, who finally succeeded in bringing the strike to an end on July 11 by making vague promises and setting up a mixed jury. "Sarabia in his office to the Government, boasted that the principle of authority was unscathed, that the prisoners would serve their sentences and if they had not made concessions."

On September 7, an "Exhibition presented by the working class to the Constituent Cortes" was made public in Madrid, which was accompanied by an "Address to the Spanish workers" in which it was asked to support it - the fundamental request was the recognition of freedom of association - and instructions were given for collecting signatures. According to Manuel Tuñón de Lara, "it was probably the first great movement at the national level, which made workers leave their local casuistry and become aware of problems at the class level, in the category of what we have agreed to call the society's objectives." The presentation to the Cortes of the "Exhibition", drawn up by Francesc Pi i Margall and backed by 33,000 signatures, most of them collected in Catalonia, took place at the end of December.

At the time the "Exhibition" was delivered, the Congress of Deputies had already been discussing the bill presented on October 8 by the Minister of Public Works, Manuel Alonso Martínez, on "exercise, police, companies, jurisdiction and inspection of the manufacturing industry" which in principle responded to the promises made by Espartero's envoy to Barcelona to end the general strike, but which set aside the most important workers' demands. Two delegates of the Catalan workers, who were able to speak before the parliamentary commission to demand the right of association, responded to the argument that "you are already associated ... you are part of a nation", by saying: "This association does not guarantee, however, the value of our faculties against the demands of capital, nor does it assure our life from hunger." But both the bill and the "Exhibition" came to nothing because in July 1856 the Espartero government fell and the experience of the progressive biennium ended.

According to Tuñón de Lara, during this period there was a shift from some worker associations where "a simple mutualist spirit" prevailed to others where what was characteristic was "the spirit of the resistance society, what today we usually call a trade union." "The objective of a professional and solidarity nature were beginning to be fundamental; to achieve them there was already a trend towards a permanent organization. Around this associative structure, and partly thanks to it, movements were already taking place in which non-associates participated; major strikes, the signature campaign for the "Exhibition" ...".

== Second half of the reign of Elizabeth II (1856–1868) ==
After the progressive biennium, workers' societies were banned, although they continued to function in hiding, as demonstrated by the 1858 strike of "Industrial Spain" in Sants, which cannot be explained without the existence of some kind of organization. On June 10, 1861, the government of the Liberal Union chaired by Leopoldo O'Donnell approved a Royal Order allowing the formation of mutual aid societies called Montepíos, although with numerous restrictions — they could not have more than 1,000 members; a maximum quota was established; surplus funds were to be deposited in the capital's savings bank. In the Ordinance applied by the Royal Order in Barcelona, it was expressly forbidden that its directors may hold meetings or establish relationships for the settlement of any matter that affects the workers, and the infringement or non-compliance with the bases that are prescribed will cause the dissolution of Montepío alone, which the authority will have to order, on the spot, as a dangerous association for the preservation of public order, handing over the guilty to the courts so that they also suffer the punishment they deserve. Some fifteen thousand workers from Barcelona presented a document in the Cortes in which they requested "freedom of association to fight capital in a noble and peaceful way," but their request was rejected. There was some initiative to address the social issue by members and supporters of the Progressive Party in Catalonia such as the foundation in 1862 of the Catalan Athenaeum of the Working Class.

The situation changed in 1864 when the Captain General of Catalonia, Domingo Dulce y Garay, allowed the workers' societies to function in fact, which opened a period of freedom, during which two newspapers of some importance appeared, El Obrero and La Asociación, and the first Barcelona Workers' Congress could be held, all of them with the objective of achieving freedom of association. As Tuñón de Lara points out, "the essence of the process of social awareness was translated into the conviction that it was necessary to associate precisely as workers and to "resist capital", that is, with a social-professional purpose. On the other hand, there was a great demarcation between this socio-professional activity and politics, the latter charged with Democrats and Republicans, who were still influencing some workers' nuclei."

The first issue of El Obrero appeared on September 4, 1864, directed by Antoni Gusart i Vila, with the aim of defending "the interests of the proletariat" and obtaining the right of workers' association, both for "resistance to capital" and to form "workers' societies applied to production and consumption," that is, to form cooperatives, a movement that gained strength in those years and also provided legal coverage to resistance societies. El Obrero was published until its suspension in June 1866 by government order within the repression unleashed after the failed San Gil Barracks uprising in Madrid. The newspaper La Asociación, directed by Josep Roca i Galès, a great defender of cooperativism, was also a victim of repression and on July 8, 1866, it was closed, so it only published fourteen issues since it was released on April 1 of that same year.

El Obrero was the main promoter of the Workers' Congress that was held on September 25 and 26, 1865 in the Salón Universal in Barcelona and was attended by delegates from forty companies. The first important agreement that was reached was the formation of a federation of workers 'societies and workers' centers in those places where there was more than one society, of which El Obrero would be its official organ, and one of its objectives would be to propagate "the practice of cooperative societies." The second was to send a petition to the Government to recognize freedom of association, "since how many exhibitions have been addressed to the Cortes have been as many stones thrown into deep chasm." The exhibition was published in "El Obrero" on January 7, 1866, with Gusart as the first signer.

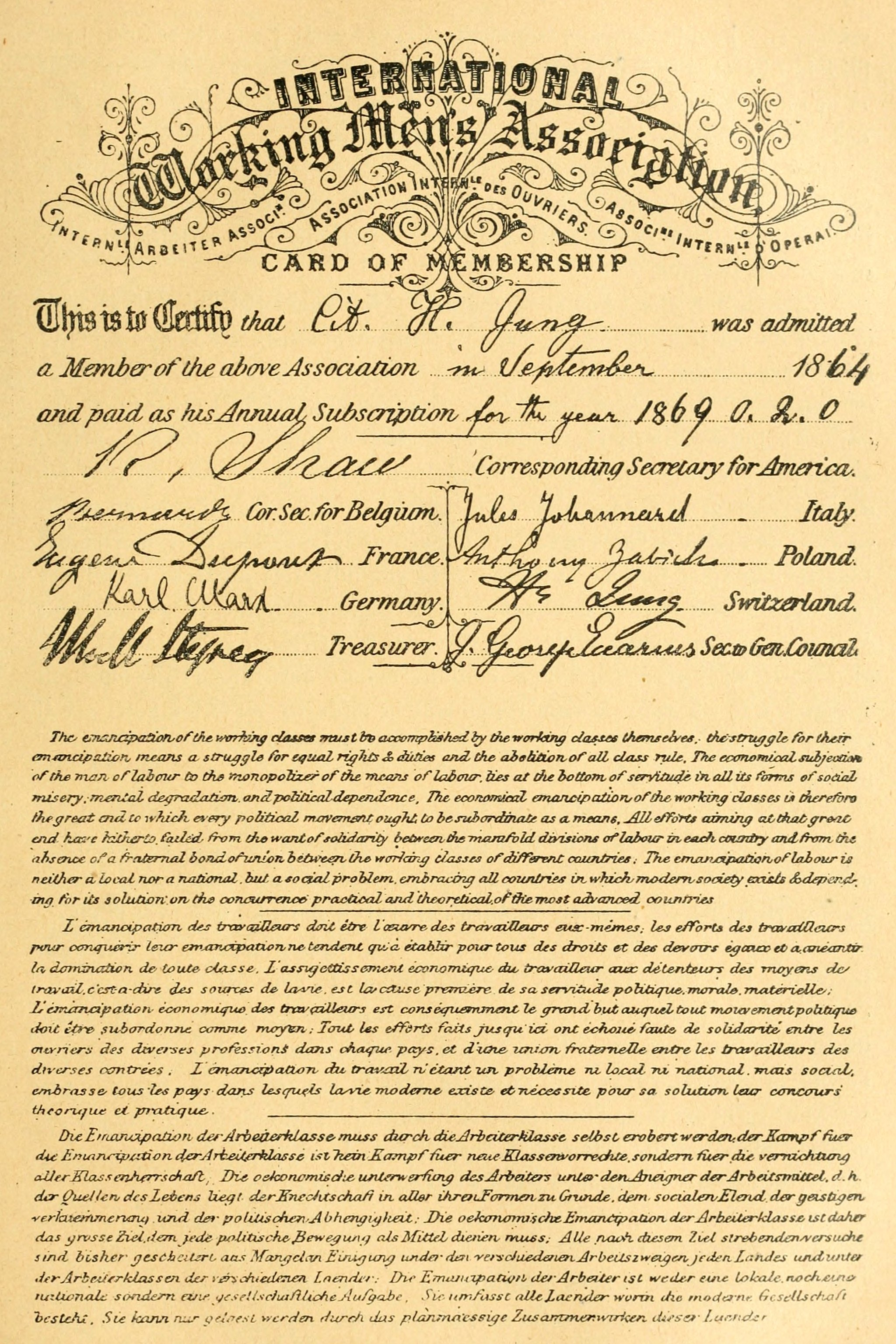
Certificate, issued in English, of membership in the International Workingmens Association (IWA).

Two years earlier, Father Antonio Vicent had founded the Catholic Workers' Circles in order to "remedy the apostasy of the masses, the individual and the nations" — the first circle was organized in Manresa. Employers also participated in them, as "protective partners." As Tuñón de Lara pointed out, it was "an organization for workers, created from abroad, in which religious, mutualistic and "conciliation" purposes concurred."

In those years, there was knowledge of the existence of the International Workingmen's Association (IWA) founded in London in September 1864. From the Conference that met the following year to prepare its first Congress - to be held in Geneva from September 3 to 8, 1866 - echoed El Obrero in its issue of November 1, 1865 - on March 18, 1866 Gusart wrote an article on the International. At the 2nd Congress of the IWA held in Lausanne from September 2 to 7, 1867, a message was read sent from Barcelona by a so-called "Social-Republican League" and Paul Lafargue, appointed by the council as secretary for Spain, read a letter sent from Madrid. The 3rd Congress, held in Brussels between September 6 and 13, 1868, was attended by a Spanish delegate, "Sarro Magallán", as a representative of the so-called "Iberian Labor Legion" and of "the workers' associations of Catalonia." His real name was Antonio Marsal Anglora, a worker from Barcelona. "Sarro Magallán" reported on the second day of the Congress of the existence of clandestine organizations in Catalonia and Andalusia. However, as Tuñón de Lara has pointed out, "the International's contacts with Spain, before the 1868 revolution, were as slight as they were ephemeral and nothing allows us to speak of a Spanish labor movement related to the IWA."

== Beginning of the Democratic Sexennium (1868–1870) ==
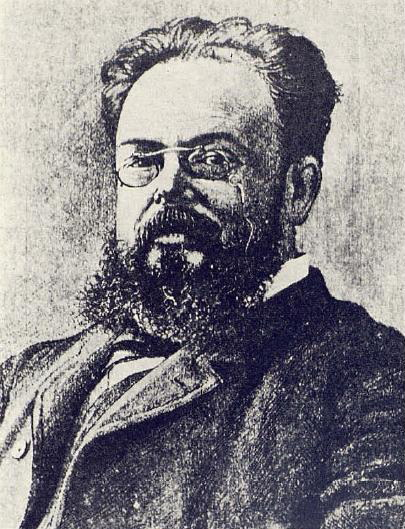
Rafael Farga Pellicer, general secretary of the Central Directorate of the Workers 'Societies who convened the 1868 Barcelona Workers' Congress. He participated in the Basel Congress of the International Workingmen's Association where he related to Mikhail Bakunin, whose influence he transferred to the Catalan labor movement.

The Revolution of September 1868 opened a period of freedom in which workers' societies - in their two variants of mutual aid societies and of resistance societies - were able to emerge from the secrecy in which they had lived for most of the reign of Isabella II. In October the Provisional Government decreed freedom of association and that same month the "Central Directorate of the Barcelona Workers' Societies" was founded, integrating those societies that had subsisted in hiding and new ones that were created then. The "Central Directorate" was formed by societies of hand weavers and mechanical weavers, bakers, stonemasons, locksmiths, printers, cabinetmakers, tailors, etc. The "Central Directorate" issued an appeal "To the workers of Catalonia" in which it summoned them to hold a Congress, because "in all countries where the institutions give enough guarantee for this, the working class meets, holds congresses, not only local but international."

In December 1868 the Second Barcelona Workers' Congress was held in which 61 societies were represented. There it was agreed to support the establishment of the Federal Republic and the participation of the working class in the elections and the publication of the weekly La Federación - which would become the most important internationalist newspaper. Cooperativism was also supported as a way to achieve social emancipation — in February 1869, the Central Directorate would be renamed the Federal Center of the Barcelona Workers' Societies. Among its leaders were men who would later become prominent figures of the FRE-AIT: Rafael Farga Pellicer and Antonio Marsal Anglora, appointed secretaries of the organization; and Juan Nuet, Jaime Balasch, Clement Bové and Juan Fargas. It was also agreed to form mixed commissions of employers and workers in which they would discuss their demands. One proof of the close relationship between the Catalan social movement and federal republicanism was that the worker Alsina, a member of the Veil Weavers Society, was elected by Barcelona in the federal republican candidacy during the 1869 Spanish general election. Baldomer Lostau i Prats, who would later join the Barcelona section of the International, was also elected.

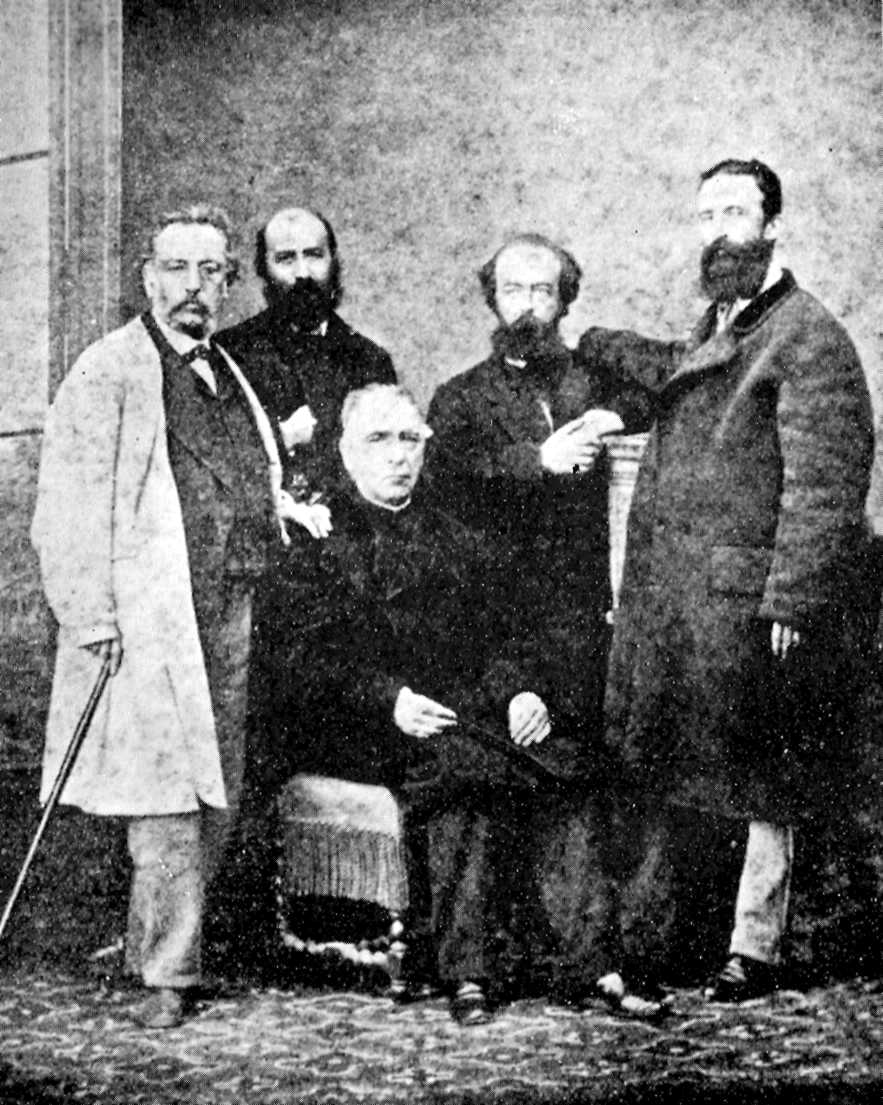
From left to right: Fernando Garrido, Arístides Rey, José María Orense (seated), Elie Reclus and Giuseppe Fanelli.

Although the AIT founded in London in 1864 was already known, direct contact with it came through the Italian Giuseppe Fanelli, sent by Mikhail Bakunin, who arrived in Barcelona at the end of October 1868 where he met with the leaders of the Central Directorate. After passing through Tarragona, Tortosa and Valencia, accompanied by Elie Reclus, Arístides Rey, Fernando Garrido and José María Orense, Fanelli went to Madrid where he arrived on November 4. There he held a first meeting at the home of the lithographer Julián Rubao Donadeu with the group of workers who frequented the cultural group "Fomento de las Artes". From there the initial nucleus of the International would emerge in Madrid, made up of twenty-one people: five construction painters, four typographers — one of them Anselmo Lorenzo, two tailors, two engravers — one of them Tomás González Morago, two shoemakers, a carpenter, a gilder, a lithographer, a rope maker, a horseman and a journalist. The group was formed on January 24, 1869, but it would not officially become the Madrid section of the AIT until December of that year.

Fanelli provided them with official documents from the International but also from the International Alliance of Socialist Democracy, the secret anarchist organization created in September 1868 by Bakunin, which, according to Tuñón de Lara, "was going to influence the subsequent development of the International in Spain already engender a far-reaching misunderstanding" — however Josep Termes considers that its importance has been magnified. In December the Alliance had seen his request for admission to the IWA denied but Fanelli was unaware of it when he formed the International group. Eight members of the Madrid group also joined the Alliance, unaware that what it was advocating was contrary to what was approved by the International, influenced by the ideas of Karl Marx. While the International had agreed at its 2nd Congress "that the social emancipation of the workers is inseparable from their political emancipation" and "that the establishment of political freedoms is a principal measure of absolute necessity", the Alliance rejected "all revolutionary action that does not have as an immediate and direct objective the triumph of the cause of the workers against capital" and advocated the disappearance of the State, replaced by the "universal union of free associations."

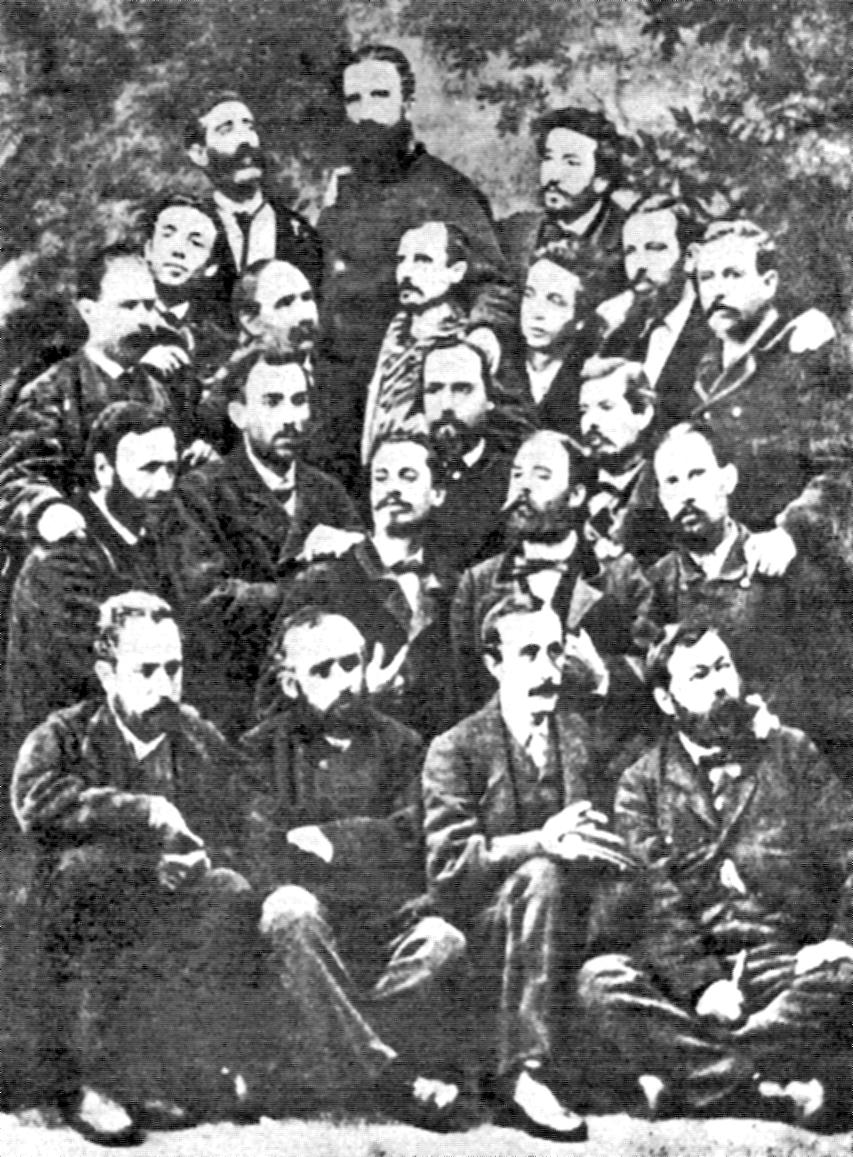
Group of founders of the International Workingmen's Association (IWA), in Madrid, in November 1868. Giuseppe Fanelli appears in the center, at the top, with a long beard.

At the beginning of 1869 Fanelli arrived in Barcelona where he gathered a group of more than twenty workers in the workshop of the painter José Luis Pellicer, uncle of the typographer Rafael Farga Pellicer, general secretary of the Federal Center for Workers' Societies and the Catalan Athenaeum of the Working Class. This group, as Tuñón de Lara has pointed out, "was going to act in a favorable "field of cultivation" facilitated by the plurality of workers' societies in the Barcelona city and the experience of corporate action that existed there." The group became the Barcelona section of the IWA in May 1869, seven months before the Madrid section. In both cases with the same confusion between the International and the Alliance, as if they were the same thing. "Thus, the first Spanish affiliates to the AIT believed that the program of the Bakuninist secret society (suppression of the State, rejection of parliamentary politics, abolition of social classes and collectivization of property) coincided with the principles of the First International."

This "sui generis combination of Alliance principles and the International" "would mark a particular course for anarchist socialism in Spain, providing it with an ideological amalgam that, strictly speaking, was not that of the International Workingmen's Association." In addition, these first groups were endowed with a double organizational level: one public and the other secret.

In September 1869, two representatives of the Barcelona nucleus, Rafael Farga Pellicer and the doctor Gaspar Sentiñón, attended the 4th Congress of the IWA that was held in Basel. The first was as representative of the Federal Center of Workers' Societies, and the second of the section of the International and the Alliance. The Madrid group only sent a greeting, as they did not have enough money to pay for the trip. In the Farga and Sentiñón Congress they proposed that the next one be held in Barcelona, "the industrial capital of the Iberian federative Republic." They also presented a report on the situation in Spain after the triumph of the Revolution of September 1868 in which they said:

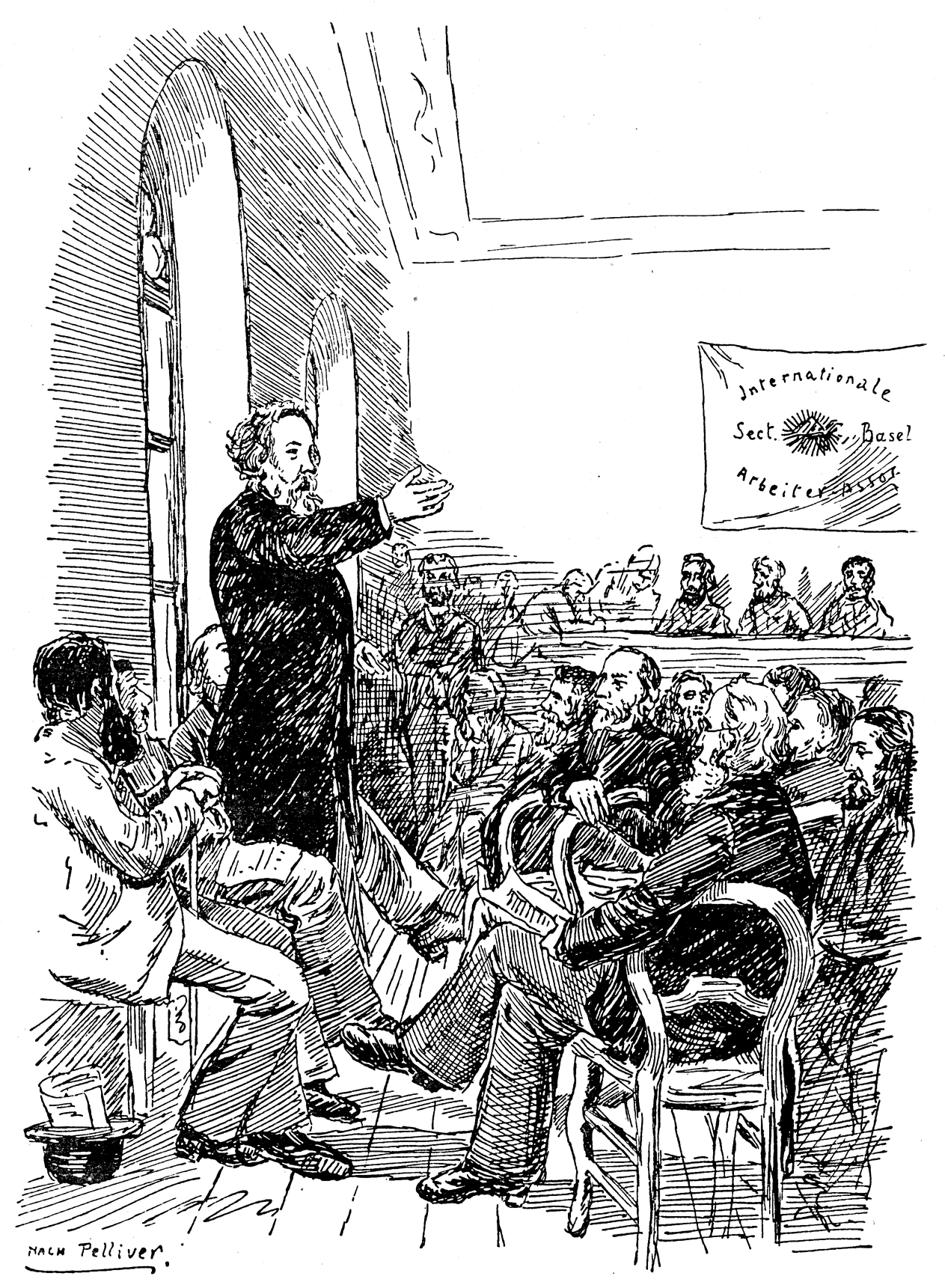
Mikhail Bakunin at the Basel Congress of the IWA in 1869. Drawing by Rafael Farga Pellicer.

Taking advantage of a military movement, the people have overthrown the throne, which always oppresses the living forces of labor. The beneficial effects of freedom have given great solidarity and great strength to the few societies that have been able to resist this long period of oppression. First, all kinds of societies were formed, not only in the large labor centers, but also in the localities of small industries. […]
The organization of the country is such that, acting intelligently, it can give extraordinary results in a short time. the International. Barcelona is one of the most important cities for this, because the number of organized corporations is already 38, with 8,080 members ... The Federal Center for Workers' Societies, established after the "evolution" of September–October 1868, has managed to organize and federate some of the workers' societies in many places in Spain. Thirty-four Barcelona societies work in the Iberian labor organization… Many of these labor societies have come together to cooperate with the same purpose. It is enough to verify that in Spain we know of the existence of 195 companies with more than 25,000 members.

In Basel, Farga Pellicer and Sentiñón established a close relationship with Mikhail Bakunin, with whom they had already contacted by letter, which led to a change in their conceptions that would later be transferred to the Catalan labor movement.

However, the majority of the workers' movement continued to support federal republicanism, although the failure of the insurrection of September and October 1869, as well as the failure to fulfill the promises of the Provisional Government to suppress consumption and the fifths increased the "anti-political" sentiment, which led the internationalists to intensify their propaganda campaign against the Republican Party and against workers' participation in the elections. The harsh police repression that was unleashed on the occasion of the "mutiny against the quintas" in Barcelona in April 1870 also helped to spread antipoliticism. "In this environment, it was possible for the Barcelonian Bakuninist leadership nucleus to make some of its proposals triumph in the first Spanish workers' congress, which took place in Barcelona in June of that year."

In January 1870, the Madrid group, which already had 23 office sections, brought out the newspaper La Solidaridad, whose writers included Vicente López, Hipólito Pauly, Máximo Ambau, Juan Alcázar, Anselmo Lorenzo, Francisco Mora and Tomás González Morago. In its February 12 issue, La Solidaridad proposed holding a workers' congress in Madrid on the first Sunday of May, but the Barcelona section claimed that the capital had few workers' societies, and the newspaper La Federación proposed that federal centers be consulted, organizing a vote in which affiliates from 26 towns throughout Spain participated. Barcelona won, which obtained 10,030 votes, while Madrid obtained 3,370, with Zaragoza (694 votes), Valencia (648), Reus (20) and Alcázar de San Juan (8) far behind. Barcelona was therefore designated to celebrate the first workers' congress at a state level in the history of the labor movement in Spain and the date set was June 19. A few days before the Congress, the Madrid IWA Section approved the following resolution, clearly Bakuninist: "it is advised that the International completely separate itself from everything that could have a middle class political character."

== Bibliography ==
- Lida, Clara E. (1973). Antecedentes y desarrollo del movimiento obrero español (1835-1888). Textos y documentos (in Spanish). Madrid: Siglo XXI. ISBN 84-323-0098-5.
- Termes, Josep (1977). Anarquismo y sindicalismo en España. La Primera Internacional (1864-1881) (in Spanish). Barcelona: Crítica. ISBN 84-7423-023-3.
- Termes, Josep (2011). Historia del anarquismo en España (1870-1980) (in Spanish). Barcelona: RBA. ISBN 978-84-9006-017-9.
- Tuñón de Lara, Manuel (1977) [1972]. El movimiento obrero en la historia de España. I.1832-1899 (in Spanish) (2ª ed.). Barcelona: Laia. ISBN 84-7222-331-0.
