= 1868 Barcelona Workers' Congress =

- Native name: Congrés Obrer de Barcelona de 1868
- Date: 1868
- Location: Barcelona
- Also known as: Second Barcelona Workers' Congress
- Type: Congress
- Cause: Glorious Revolution
- Motive: Federal republicanism
- Organised by: Central Directorate of Workers' Societies of Barcelona
- Participants: Catalan workers' societies
- Outcome: Support for the Federal Democratic Republican Party in the 1869 Spanish general election; Establishment of the newspaper La Federación.

The 1868 Barcelona Workers' Congress was convened on December 13, 1868, by the Central Directorate of Workers' Societies of Barcelona, which had been created two months earlier thanks to the freedom achieved after the triumph of the Glorious Revolution of September 1868. Sixty-one Catalan workers' societies attended. Its most immediate antecedent was the 1865 Barcelona Workers' Congress - the first in the history of the labor movement in Spain, although it was also limited to Catalonia. It wasn't until 1870 that the first state-level workers' congress was held, which also had its headquarters in Barcelona, and from which the FRE-AIT would emerge.

== Background ==
The September Revolution of 1868 opened a period of freedom in which the workers' societies - in their two variants of mutual aid societies and of resistance societies - were able to emerge from the secrecy in which they had lived for most of the reign of Isabella II. In October the Provisional Government decreed freedom of association and that same month the "Central Directorate of the Barcelona Workers' Societies" was founded, which united those that had survived underground and newly created societies. Societies of hand weavers and mechanical weavers, bakers, stonemasons, locksmiths, printers, cabinetmakers, tailors, etc. joined it.

The "Central Directorate" issued an appeal "To the workers of Catalonia" in which it summoned them to hold a Congress, because "in all countries where the institutions give enough guarantee for this, the working class meets, holds congresses, not only local but international". It was proposed that three representatives for each workers' society in Barcelona and five for each locality where there were workers' societies would attend. In Congress, it would be especially about the form of government that would replace the overthrown Kingdom of Spain.

The first issue that embraces them all today is the reconstitution of our homeland, which must be born from the system of government that the nation accepts as the most advantageous ... This must be the fundamental basis of the deliberations of the congress, to determine which is the form of government that can best protect the interests of the working class, in order to support it with the efforts of all, voting in the elections for deputies who undertake to defend within the national representation the approach of the system of government that has seemed most advantageous.

== Development ==
61 Catalan workers' associations were represented at the congress, 34 from Barcelona and the remaining, of the 45 that have been identified, from Roda, Tiana, Mataró, Igualada, Sallent, Moyá, Manlleu, Sabadell, Estany, Martorell and Tarragona. Among the agreements that were adopted included the support for the establishment of a Federal Republic, the participation of the working class in the elections and the decision to publish a weekly newspaper under the name of La Federación - which would later become the most important internationalist newspaper. Cooperativism was also supported as a way to achieve social emancipation, as well as the formation of mixed commissions of employers and workers in which they would discuss their demands. Among its leaders were men who would later become prominent figures of the FRE-AIT: Rafael Farga Pellicer and Antonio Marsal Anglora, appointed secretaries of the organization; and Juan Nuet, Jaime Balasch, Clement Bové and Juan Fargas.

Those who defended the federal Republic argued that through it "we will obtain decentralization, that in vain we will wait for it from those who want a unitary Republic, which so much favors ... the courtiers who live at the expense of the other provinces." Farga Pellicer said "that the three political parties, absolutist, constitutional and democratic, that exist, represent the three classes in which society is currently divided: the nobility, the middle class and the working class" and that "if they do not want to commit suicide then they must vote for and defend the Republic ... The working class, despite being more ignorant, will solve the problem of freedom, equality and brotherhood of the peoples." He also stated that "the cooperative societal system is the only one that will emancipate the worker from the tyranny of capital, the federative Republic will be the one that will emancipate the people from the tyranny of despots." In its first issue La Federación proclaimed its support for the Federal Republic, "a form of government that best suits the class interests of the workers, a political form necessary for their emancipation".

== Consequences ==
In January 1869, the "Central Directorate of the Barcelona Workers' Societies" asked the workers to vote for the candidacies of the Federal Democratic Republican Party "because [political] indifference among you would be a crime ...; because we would give place to that despotism and other plagues attached to it were once again enthroned in our poor country. The proclamation was signed by Farga Pellicer.

The worker Pablo Alsina, a member of the Veil Weavers Society, and Baldomer Lostau i Prats were elected by Barcelona, who would later join the Barcelona section of the International Workingmen's Association (IWA).

After the celebration of the elections, the "Central Directorate" organized a "political tea", on February 5, to honor the deputies of the Federal Democratic Republican Party elected by the constituency from Barcelona, and in which Pablo Alsina took the floor. Two days earlier the "Central Directorate" had issued a manifesto "To the workers of all countries" in response to the message sent by the Geneva section of the IWA "to the Spanish workers" dated December 26, 1868, and in which it opposed their supporting the Republic, and to the one sent by the German section in which it set out the opposite position. To the Genevans, the manifesto said: "It is well enough that the freedom that the political revolution exclusively provides is unnecessary to lift the people from moral and material decay ... We all understand that freedom without political equality, and political equality without economic freedom, is nothing more than a hoax. But we came out of a despotic and prostrate situation, in which our rights to instruction, to science, to intellectual life did not exist. And to the Germans: "Today, that for freedom the Republic goes to the realization of the greatest social problems ... See [the working people] organize hundreds of COOPERATIVE SOCIETIES, well convinced that for them, and only for them, it must be well redeemed soon from the miserable condition of wage slavery ... See them ... compact ... go to the elections with the holy desire of the Republic."

As Josep Termes has pointed out, "in this period of integration between workerism and federalism", "prominent leaders of the Barcelona unions not only appeared in the ranks of federal republicanism, but they even reached leading positions in the party."

== Bibliography ==
- Termes, Josep (1977). Anarquismo y sindicalismo en España. La Primera Internacional (1864-1881) (in Spanish). Barcelona: Crítica. ISBN 84-7423-023-3.
- Termes, Josep (2011). Historia del anarquismo en España (1870-1980) (in Spanish). Barcelona: RBA. ISBN 978-84-9006-017-9.
- Tuñón de Lara, Manuel (1977) [1972]. El movimiento obrero en la historia de España. I.1832-1899 (in Spanish) (2ª ed.). Barcelona: Laia. ISBN 84-7222-331-0.
