= La Igualdad =

- Type: Daily newspaper
- Founder(s): Francisco García Padrós; José Guisasola; Alfredo Vega
- Founded: 11 November 1868
- Ceased publication: 30 December 1874
- Relaunched: 16 April 1880 — 3 November 1880
- Political alignment: Federal republicanism
- Language: Spanish
- City: Madrid
- Country: Spain
- ISSN: 2172-3672
- OCLC number: 733195298

La Igualdad (The Equality) was a newspaper published in the Spanish city of Madrid between 1868 and 1874, during the Sexenio Democrático, although it also saw a second period of publication in 1880.

== History ==
Edited in Madrid, it was printed in its own printing press, under the subtitle "democratic-republican newspaper". Its first number appeared on 11 November 1868, four pages long. Linked to federal republicanism and founded by Francisco García Padrós, José Guisasola and Alfredo Vega, the direction of the newspaper was entrusted to Eduardo Benot, Ramón de Cala, Estanislao Figueras, Francisco García López, Adolfo Joarizti, Carlos Martra, Andrés Mellado, José María Orense and José Paúl y Angulo. Its first period lasted at least until 30 December 1874. Its second period, which began on 16 April 1880, continued at least until 3 November that year, the day until which its file arrived in the Digital Newspaper Library of the National Library of Spain.

== Bibliography ==
- Hartzenbusch, Eugenio (1894). Apuntes para un catálogo de periódicos madrileños desde el año 1661 al 1870. Madrid: Establecimiento tipográfico "Sucesores de Rivadeneyra".
- Pérez Roldán, Carmen (1999). "La prensa republicana madrileña durante el siglo XIX: "La Igualdad" y "El Combate" como ejemplos de periódicos republicanos". Historia y Comunicación Social (4). UCM: 317–340. ISSN 1137-0734.
