= Libertà e Giustizia =

Italian political association founded in 1867

Libertà e Giustizia (English: Liberty and Justice) was an Italian democratic and socialist political association founded in Naples in early 1867 by the Italian associates of Mikhail Bakunin. Considered one of the earliest socialist organizations in southern Italy, it brought together various figures from the contemporary Neapolitan left, particularly those associated with Mazzinianism and the Garibaldian movement. The association contributed to the spread of libertarian socialism and federalism in Naples and its surrounding region. It also established and published a weekly newspaper of the same name, devoted to political and social issues, which played a role in the political development of the circles from which the first Neapolitan section of the International Workingmen's Association would later emerge.

== History ==
=== Origins and foundation ===
Saverio Friscia, president of the association.

The association emerged from the political activities undertaken by Mikhail Bakunin during his stay in Naples, which began in June 1865. During this period, the Russian revolutionary established relationships with several members of the local democratic left, encouraging their development towards socialist, federalist and internationalist positions. Bakunin's principal associates at the time included Giuseppe Fanelli, Carlo Gambuzzi, Saverio Friscia, Attanasio Dramis and Pier Vincenzo De Luca. Bakunin's ideas spread among the intellectual circles of the southern Italian left, which were marked by disappointment with the results of the unification of Italy, disagreements among the various currents of republican democracy and the weakening of the Action Party. Within this context, the social question acquired increasing importance, particularly in relation to the living conditions of the lower classes and criticism of the Italian state's administrative centralisation. However, the movement of part of the Neapolitan left towards socialism did not entail an immediate break with the traditions of the Risorgimento. Mazzinian, federalist and Garibaldian tendencies coexisted for a considerable period alongside socialist ideas, often united by the desire to continue political and revolutionary activity following national unification. It was from this heterogeneous combination of political ideas that Libertà e Giustizia was founded between January and February 1867, with the direct involvement of Bakunin, who nevertheless declined to assume its public leadership because of the risk of expulsion by the Italian authorities. The presidency was therefore entrusted to Saverio Friscia, while Attanasio Dramis became secretary. In addition to these two figures, the executive committee included Carlo Mileti, Giuseppe Fanelli, Carlo Gambuzzi, Antonio Piscopo, Pasquale Cimmino, Francesco Calfapetra, Raffaele Di Serio, Raffaele Mileti, Domenico De Martino, Pier Vincenzo De Luca, Stefano Caporusso, Ferdinando Manes Rossi and Gregorio Mayer. The composition of the executive committee reflected the diversity of political orientations within the Neapolitan democratic left. Members such as Fanelli and Gambuzzi were closely associated with Bakunin's revolutionary programme, whereas others, including Carlo Mileti, remained strongly attached to Giuseppe Mazzini and the Garibaldian movement. Consequently, membership of Libertà e Giustizia did not necessarily imply full acceptance of a common political doctrine.

=== The electoral manifesto of 1867 ===
As its first public initiative, the association published an electoral manifesto for the 1867 Italian general election. The document was approved on 27 February during an extraordinary meeting chaired by Friscia and published on 5 March in the Neapolitan daily newspaper Il Popolo d'Italia. Rather than presenting a list of candidates, the manifesto outlined an extensive political platform proposing a variety of political, economic and institutional reforms, ranging from military organization to taxation. It also advocated several democratic demands, including universal suffrage, the right of voters to recall elected representatives, the election of the Senate through provincial councils, and full freedom of association, religion, assembly and education. The programme was primarily addressed to the bourgeoisie, which held most voting rights at the time, and contained a number of contradictions and inconsistencies. These reflected the continued influence of the democratic-republican component of the association, which had not abandoned its own political positions in favour of those of the socialists. The programme was subsequently revised and became the association's political platform, with a new version approved in March 1867. The following month, the association underwent an internal reorganization, although its leadership remained unchanged.

=== Organization and political orientation ===
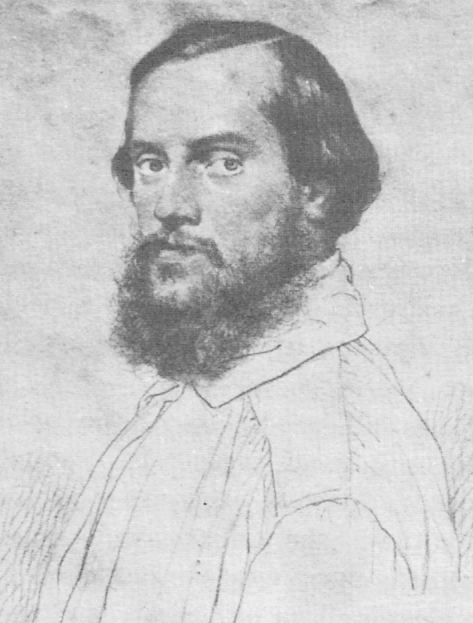
The ideas of Carlo Pisacane were among the influences on the association's political programme.

The association's objectives included the religious, political and social emancipation of the population and the improvement of its moral and material conditions. It identified the press, public lectures and associative activity as the principal means of achieving these aims. Its organizational structure included a general assembly of members, an executive committee and regular meetings. Admission was subject to strict conditions, including restrictions on the participation of employees of the state administration. The association also intended to establish connections with similar organizations in Italy and abroad that shared its aims and programme. These restrictions contributed to keeping the association relatively small, with no more than forty members, limiting its capacity for action in comparison with the political ambitions of its founders. The association's public programme contained radical democratic and social proposals, but never explicitly declared its adherence to revolutionary socialism. This approach reflected the intention to attract republican and democratic associations towards Bakunin's ideas and gradually encourage them to adopt a more advanced programme of social transformation. Nevertheless, the ideological character of Libertà e Giustizia remained heterogeneous. It was strongly influenced both by its anarchist component and by the development of socialist ideas in southern Italy, which some historians have connected to the influence of Carlo Pisacane. The association thus represented a point of convergence between different political tendencies, bringing together supporters of Bakunin and democrats who continued to regard the social question as an integral part of the programme of the Risorgimento, without considering either republicanism or Garibaldianism to have become obsolete. The appointment of Carlo Cattaneo as an honorary member, despite his considerable political differences with Bakunin, further demonstrated the diversity of political and intellectual influences within the association.

=== Activities in 1868 ===
The association remained active at least until 1868, even after its newspaper had ceased publication. In February of that year, its members discussed the possibility of reviving the weekly with a different administrative organization and a smaller print run, but the project was never implemented. In August 1868, ahead of the second congress of the League of Peace and Freedom, scheduled to take place in Bern the following September, the association decided to endorse the congress with a statement explaining its position. It also planned to publish a report on federalism, although there is no confirmation that the document was ever issued. These initiatives demonstrate the continuity of the Neapolitan group's political activities beyond the publication of its newspaper, although its capacity for propaganda remained limited and was further weakened by Bakunin's departure from Italy.

== The newspaper Libertà e Giustizia ==
=== Foundation and publication ===
Carlo Mileti, a member of the leadership of Libertà e Giustizia and an editor of Il Popolo d'Italia.

The principal propaganda initiative of Libertà e Giustizia was the publication of a weekly newspaper bearing the same name, conceived as a means of disseminating the political programme of the Neapolitan group. Publication began on 17 August 1867 and ended on 24 December of the same year, after sixteen issues, owing to the association's financial difficulties, which were exacerbated by seizures ordered by the police authorities. The newspaper was edited by Pier Vincenzo De Luca, who also wrote a substantial proportion of its articles. Its editorial orientation was heavily influenced by Bakunin's thought, and it published several of his writings. Among these was a letter addressed by the Russian revolutionary to Alexander Herzen, in which Bakunin rejected Pan-Slavism and other forms of nationalism, explicitly declaring his adherence to anarchism and federalism. In addition to disseminating Bakunin's ideas, the newspaper helped publicize the activities of the International Workingmen's Association, publishing documents issued by its General Council and one of the earliest Italian translations of a passage from Das Kapital by Karl Marx. The publication of Libertà e Giustizia developed alongside that of the Neapolitan democratic daily newspaper Il Popolo d'Italia, which had been owned by Carlo Mileti since 1863. Mileti had maintained a predominantly Mazzinian political orientation, while attempting to open his newspaper to the emerging social demands circulating within the democratic movement of southern Italy. During 1867, several of Mileti's collaborators associated with Libertà e Giustizia acquired increasing influence over the editorial direction of Il Popolo d'Italia, moving it towards more radical positions. This development caused tensions within Mazzinian circles.

== Relations with the First International ==
The association's activities encouraged closer ties between Neapolitan democrats and socialists and the International Workingmen's Association, which had been founded in London in 1864. During the congress of the League of Peace and Freedom, held in Geneva in September 1867, several members of the Neapolitan group established contacts with George Odger and William Randal Cremer, both members of the International's General Council. They discussed the possibility of establishing a Naples section of the IWA, an initiative that developed in the context of the gradual movement of Bakunin's intellectual circle towards internationalist socialism. Following these contacts, the first Naples section of the International was founded on 31 January 1869, after a period of preparation to which both Libertà e Giustizia and its newspaper had contributed. Much of the new section's leadership came from the circles associated with the earlier organization, alongside other activists, including Stefano Caporusso. The experiences of Libertà e Giustizia and the Naples section of the IWA were therefore closely connected through their membership, organizational networks and propaganda activities. The association represented one of the principal early organizational expressions of Bakuninist socialism in southern Italy and played an important role in the formation of the local section of the International.

== Bibliography ==
- Esposito, Enrico (1983). "Carlo Mileti e la democrazia repubblicana nel Mezzogiorno" (PDF). Archivio storico per la Calabria e la Lucania (in Italian). L: 19–98.
- Masini, Pier Carlo (1969). Storia degli anarchici italiani da Bakunin a Malatesta (1862–1892) (in Italian). Milan: Rizzoli.
- Nettlau, Max (1928). Bakunin e l'Internazionale in Italia dal 1864 al 1872 (in Italian). Geneva: Edizione del Risveglio.
- Pernicone, Nunzio (1993). Italian Anarchism, 1864–1892. Princeton: Princeton University Press. ISBN 9780691056920.
