= Stefano Caporusso =

Italian anarchist and trade unionist

- Born: 10 September 1817; Modugno, Italy
- Died: Unknown
- Occupations: Anarchist, trade unionist, tailor
- Known for: President of the Naples section of the International Workingmen's Association (1869–1870)

Stefano Caporusso (10 September 1817 – date of death unknown) was an Italian anarchist and trade unionist, among the principal organisers of the first Italian section of the International Workingmen's Association, which he presided over in Naples from 1869 to 1870. Initially associated with Giuseppe Mazzini's political ideas, he subsequently embraced the socialist and internationalist ideas of Mikhail Bakunin, representing the Neapolitan section at the International's 1869 congress in Basel.

== Biography ==
=== Early life and activities in the democratic movement ===
The son of Angelo Domenico Caporusso and Angela Maria D'Attolico, Caporusso worked as a tailor and at some point moved to Naples, where he participated in the activities of the democratic movement and Mazzinian workers' associations. He also took part in anti-Bourbon conspiratorial initiatives preceding the unification of Italy, although little is known about this period of his life. Although his identification is not certain, a person believed to be Caporusso appears to have held administrative positions in Modugno before and immediately after unification, serving as a municipal councillor in the town's first post-unification administration.

During the 1860s, Caporusso became a prominent figure in the Neapolitan labour movement, where he was known by the nickname operaio modello ("model worker"). In 1864 he was among the representatives who attended the congress of workers' societies in Naples. During the same period, he presided over the tailors' section of the Società operaia napoletana, one of the organisations represented at the congress, whose statutes reflected the influence of Giuseppe Mazzini's ideas and the federalism of Carlo Cattaneo. Between 1864 and 1865, he also helped establish the workers' association L'Umanitaria, becoming its president, while Giorgio Imbriani served as secretary. The association aimed to promote education and instruction among the lower classes, maintaining an outlook still closely associated with Mazzinian ideas. On 14 March 1865, as president of the association, Caporusso addressed a document to Mazzini entitled Indirizzo della Associazione umanitaria degli operai di Napoli a Mazzini, outlining the association's objectives and activities. The document was published on 26 March in the newspaper L'Unità Italiana. Mazzini replied on 29 June in the Neapolitan newspaper Il Popolo d'Italia, expressing appreciation for the initiative and its contribution to popular education.

In September of the same year, Caporusso was also among the promoters of the weekly newspaper Libertà e Lavoro, which was distributed free of charge and devoted to the education of the lower classes. During this period, he also frequented freethought circles that were emerging in Naples and other Italian cities. These circles would contribute to the anticlerical initiatives that culminated in the Anti-Council of Naples in 1869.

=== The approach to Bakunin and the Libertà e Giustizia circle ===
From the second half of the 1860s, Caporusso began to embrace the socialist and internationalist ideas of Mikhail Bakunin, the Russian anarchist philosopher who, during his stay in Naples, had established relationships with numerous representatives of the democratic left and workers' associations. Caporusso's movement towards Bakunin's ideas formed part of a broader transformation of the Neapolitan democratic movement, characterised by the emergence of political currents critical of Mazzini and increasingly concerned with the emancipation of the lower and working classes.

Within this context, on 3 April 1867, Caporusso was among the signatories of the founding declaration of the revolutionary circle Libertà e Giustizia, established in Naples by democratic and socialist activists, including Carlo Gambuzzi, Giuseppe Fanelli, Saverio Friscia, Attanasio Dramis and Carlo Mileti. Among the association's demands were universal suffrage, freedom of the press and religion, administrative decentralisation and improvements in the economic conditions of the lower classes, in a political environment where federalist ideas were accompanied by increasing attention to social issues. In August of that year, the circle began publishing a newspaper of the same name, to which Caporusso contributed until publication ceased in February of the following year. The newspaper promoted and disseminated ideas associated with various currents of European socialism.

=== Presidency of the First International ===
Between 1868 and 1869, Caporusso was among the promoters of the Neapolitan section of the International Workingmen's Association (IWA), which emerged from the Libertà e Giustizia circle and the city's workers' associations. An initial internationalist organisation developed in 1868, and the Naples section of the IWA was formally established on 31 January 1869. The organisation brought together workers and artisans, many of whom came from occupational associations, alongside representatives of revolutionary democracy. Owing to his previous organisational activities and influence among workers, Caporusso soon became one of the principal leaders of the Neapolitan internationalist movement and, following a meeting held in February 1869, was elected president of the section.

The organisation of the local IWA section attracted the attention of the city's authorities. A report issued by the prefect of Naples on 31 December 1869 stated that the section's establishment had been facilitated by Gambuzzi's activities and Caporusso's collaboration. However, Caporusso had prevailed over the Neapolitan lawyer in the selection of the president, confirming his considerable influence among workers and reflecting the authorities' growing concern about the association's activities.

The section expanded rapidly, reaching approximately 1,200 members in May 1869, according to a manifesto issued by the organisation. Under Caporusso's presidency, the association promoted internationalist propaganda, initiatives of solidarity among workers' societies and increasing mobilisation of Neapolitan workers. His role soon extended beyond the city, as he became a point of reference for the spread of the International in southern Italy.

=== The Basel Congress of 1869 ===
In September 1869, Caporusso represented the Neapolitan section at the fourth general congress of the International Workingmen's Association, held in Basel. The congress witnessed sharp disagreements between the International's various political currents, particularly over collective ownership and the abolition of inheritance rights, which brought the positions of Karl Marx and Bakunin into conflict.

On 10 September, Caporusso addressed the congress to report on the activities of the Neapolitan section, emphasising its growth among workers and its propaganda efforts in southern Italy. He expressed the need to strengthen international solidarity among workers and described the Naples section as one of the principal socialist organisations on the Italian peninsula. On 12 September, Caporusso proposed that the various sections examine the question of collectivisation more closely and identify practical means of transforming property relations. He also voted in favour of abolishing private ownership of the means of production and converting them into collective property.

In another speech, Caporusso described the economic and social conditions prevailing in Naples, focusing on inequalities between social classes, the poverty of the proletariat and the length of the working day, which could exceed fifteen hours. He also drew attention to the difficulties involved in organising strikes, owing to low wages and the lack of sufficient resources to support workers financially during industrial disputes.

Caporusso's statistical estimates concerning the population of Naples were subsequently considered unreliable by historians. During the congress, Bakunin nevertheless defended his description of the workers' conditions. The closeness between the two men was also noticed by Marx, who later referred polemically to the image of Bakunin walking arm in arm with the Neapolitan labour leader, highlighting the relationship between them during the congress.

Caporusso's participation in the congress marked an important moment in his political activity, increasing his popularity among Neapolitan workers while also causing concern to Mazzini. In September of the same year, Mazzini instructed one of his correspondents to monitor Caporusso's political development and attempt to bring him back towards his own political positions.

=== The strikes of 1869–1870 and the crisis of the Neapolitan section ===
Following his return from the Basel Congress, Caporusso resumed leadership of the Neapolitan section of the International, further developing its organisational and trade union activities. By early 1870, the section reportedly had 3,710 members, according to documents seized by the police in February of that year. Historians have not universally accepted this figure, with some proposing lower estimates, although generally still around 3,000 members.

On 5 November 1869, the newspaper L'Eguaglianza was established within the IWA under the editorship of Michelangelo Statuti, Caporusso's son-in-law. During this period, the association also became involved in organising labour disputes and providing financial support to striking workers. In 1869, Caporusso intervened in a dispute between leatherworkers and employers, helping to bring it to a conclusion. In the following December, he was also among the organisers of a strike by arsenal workers.

In February 1870, following the dismissal of 34 leatherworkers, the section called a new strike, in which approximately 200 workers participated. The organisation granted the strikers a daily allowance of two lire. The strike prompted the intervention of the public security authorities, who arrested Caporusso and several other internationalists on 5 February, including Gambuzzi, Francesco Forte and Statuti. The association's premises were also searched and several documents were seized. Caporusso and Forte were sentenced to one month's imprisonment, while Gambuzzi was acquitted. Caporusso was released from prison on 3 March 1870.

The episode aggravated tensions within the Neapolitan section. Caporusso was accused of having handled the strike ambiguously and of appropriating part of the money intended to support the imprisoned strikers, although the documents seized by the authorities did not substantiate this accusation. These tensions were also attributed to the authoritarian attitude Caporusso had adopted following his participation in the Basel Congress. He regarded himself as a representative of the International's General Council and claimed powers that had never been conferred upon him. The various controversies eventually led to his removal from the presidency and his expulsion from the section, announced in a statement dated 1 August 1870.

=== Political controversies and later years ===
Caporusso's conduct during his presidency of the Neapolitan section was strongly criticised by Marx, Friedrich Engels and members of the Italian International. Marx accused him of using the organisation for personal purposes, exercising unauthorised power and promoting the activities of his son-in-law Michelangelo Statuti, a former member of the clergy and contributor to L'Eguaglianza, whose political positions were considered incompatible with the International's objectives.

These accusations also appeared in the correspondence between Carlo Cafiero and Engels and in a report on the Neapolitan section compiled by Carmelo Palladino in November 1871. These documents criticised Caporusso's conduct following the Basel Congress, his management of the section and his relations with the General Council of the International. Cafiero's assessment of Caporusso was nevertheless more nuanced. In a letter to Engels dated 18 June 1871, he criticised Caporusso's submission to his son-in-law's influence while acknowledging the labour leader's essential personal honesty and considerable influence among Neapolitan workers. Caporusso thus appeared to be more inclined towards organisational confusion than dishonesty.

The accusations against Caporusso must also be understood in the context of the conflicts between the different currents of internationalism during those years, particularly the disputes between supporters of Bakunin and Marx. They were also intended to diminish the influence of the Bakuninist current and formed part of the political manoeuvring that would eventually contribute to the organisation's crisis.

Mazzini's attitude towards Caporusso was similarly ambivalent. Although the Genoese patriot criticised his adherence to Bakunin's ideas, he nevertheless recognised his organisational abilities and influence among Neapolitan workers.

Following his removal from the leadership of the IWA, Caporusso gradually disappeared from Neapolitan political life, with the last records of his activities dating from the early 1870s. In a polemical work published in 1872, Marx recalled that Caporusso had approached the General Council of the International to draw attention to a study on the social question prepared by his son-in-law Michelangelo Statuti, whose proposals he supported.

No further documents concerning his activities are known after this episode, and the place and date of his death remain unknown.

== Bibliography ==
- Boccolari, Giorgio (1975). "Caporusso, Stefano". Dizionario biografico degli italiani (in Italian). Vol. 18. Rome: Istituto dell'Enciclopedia Italiana.
- Macina, Raffaele (January 2015). "Alle origini del movimento operaio in Italia meridionale: Stefano Caporusso, seguace «fedele» di Bakunin". Nuovi Orientamenti (in Italian) (160 (supplement)).
- Masini, Pier Carlo (1969). Storia degli anarchici italiani da Bakunin a Malatesta (1862–1892) (in Italian). Milan: Rizzoli.
