= José María Orense =

Spanish politician and revolutionary

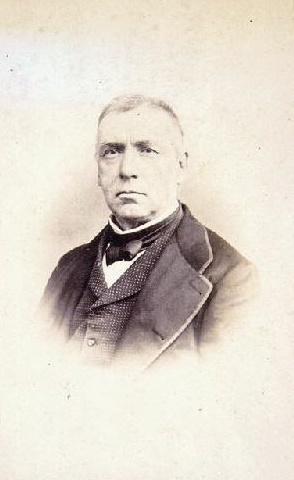
- Portrait circa 1863 by J. Laurent

President of the Congress of Deputies
- In office 7 – 12 June 1873

Personal details
- Born: 14 October 1803 Laredo, Spain
- Died: 29 October 1880 (aged 77) Astillero, Spain
- Party: Progressive Party; Democratic Party; Federal Democratic Republican Party
- Occupation: Politician, revolutionary

José María Orense de Milá de Aragón Herrero (1803–1880) was a Spanish politician and revolutionary, a prominent advocate of federal republicanism. He held the nobiliary title of Marquis of Albaida.

== Biography ==
Born in Laredo on 14 October 1803. He was a member of the Citizen Militia during the 1820–1823 Trienio Liberal. Having fought against the invading French army known as the Hundred Thousand Sons of Saint Louis, he exiled to England, returning to Spain after the death of Ferdinand VII, the Felon King. He was elected as deputy in 1844 in representation of Palencia. From then on, he became more salient in the radicalism of his proposals than the mainstream Progressive Party. He advocated the Iberian Union in his 1844 electoral platform.

He inherited the Marquisate of Albaida in 1847. He participated in the 1848 revolution and stood in the barricades in the Carrera de San Jerónimo. Also a participant in the 1854 revolution, he took part in the intentona of Los Basilios on 28 August, leading to his imprisonment.

He actively campaigned in favour of the abolition of slavery in the Cortes of 1854–1856.

He revolted against the O'Donnell-Ríos Rosas involutionary government in 1856, encouraging the general uprising. Yet again imprisoned, he exiled to France and Belgium.

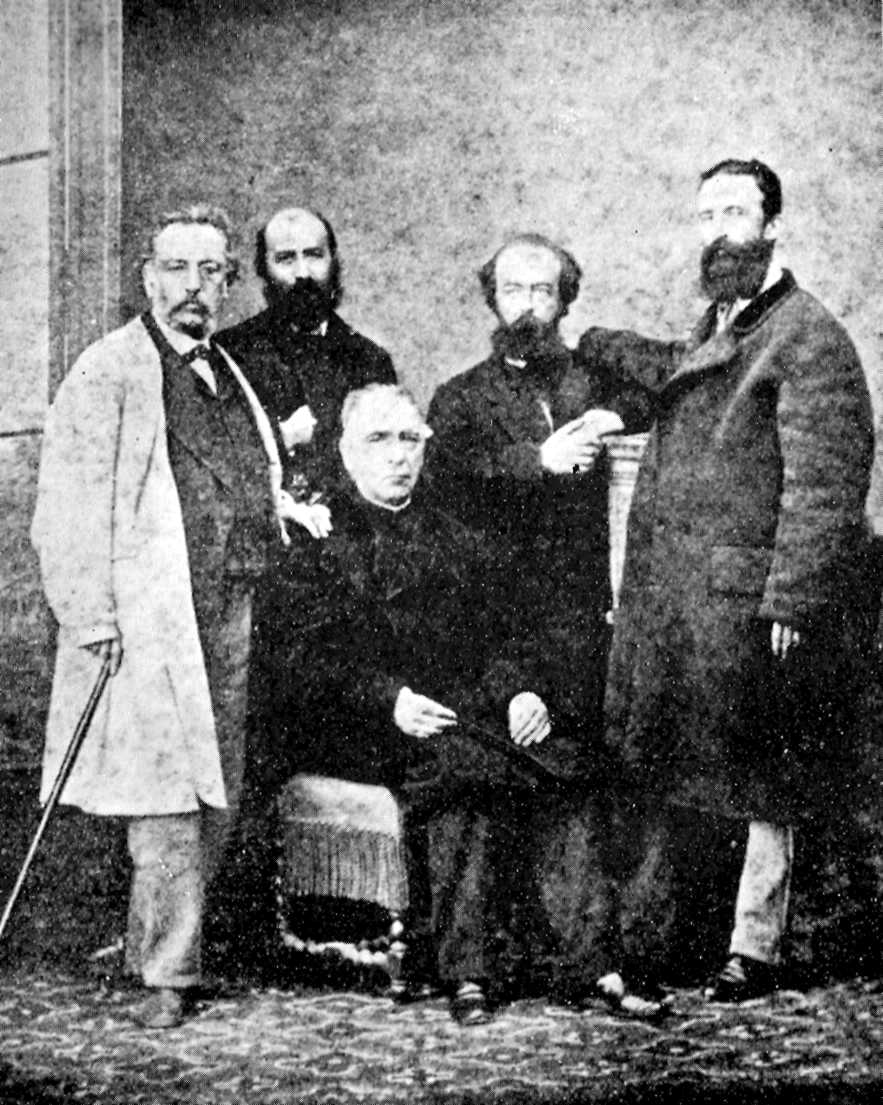
Picture taken in Early 1869 in Madrid, featuring (from left to right) Fernando Garrido, Aristide Rey, José María Orense (seated), Élie Reclus and Giuseppi Fanelli.

A proponent of Iberism, he argued again in favour of such prospect in 1858 in La Discusión, proposing a conception of the Iberian union based on a community of common interests, to be achieved extending the privileges of the Basque provinces to the rest of Spain, and then undergoing a progressive convergence with Portugal.

He returned to Madrid on the occasion of the September 1868 Glorious Revolution, and gave no pause to the provisional government. Following the September Revolution Orense became the president of the Spanish Abolitionist Society after the exit of Salustiano de Olózaga from the organization.

He also presided the meeting of the Democratic Party on 11 October 1868 at the Circo Price during which it was determined that the federal republic shall be the form of government of Spain, followed by the schism between the republicans and the accidentalist cimbrios. An active campaigner for the Republic, he was elected at the 1869 election to Constituent Cortes.

Within the stem of federal republicanism he embraced an individualist strand of workerism associated to romantic humanitarianism and social liberalism (differentiating from other leanings converging into the federal republicanism such as the socialist republicanism of Fernando Garrido and Pi y Margall or the trend represented by the Krausists), and in fact, similarly to Giuseppe Mazzini, he ultimately became weary of socialism, as he came to blame it for the demise of the Second French Republic.

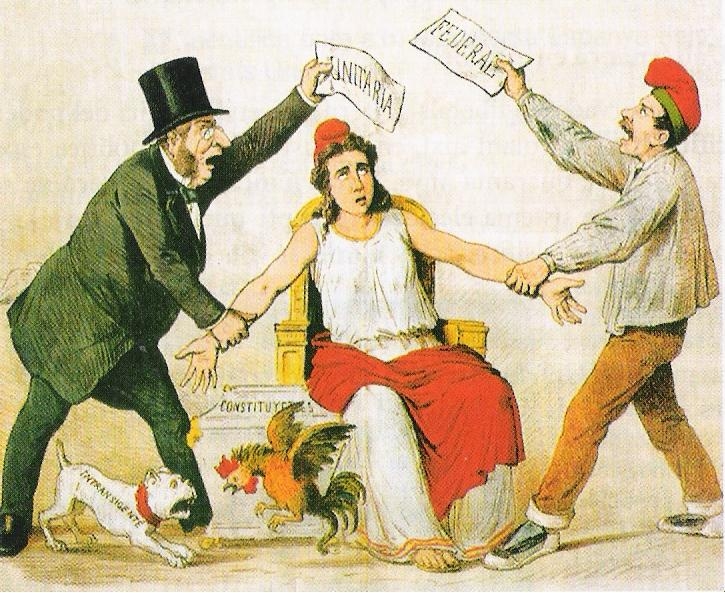
Cartoon depicting the struggle between those supporting the Unitary Republic and those supporting the Federal Republic (La Flaca, 1873)

He participated in the insurrections that took place months after the enactment of the new Constitution in June 1869. He went to Tours and organized the unit of Spanish volunteers (including his son) to help France following the Prussian invasion in 1870, rallying the banner of the Universal Republic and the Latin Federation.

He returned to Spain to vote against the candidacy of Amadeo of Savoy to be the head of State of Spain, becoming an active Republican agitator. After the proclamation of the First Spanish Republic in February 1873 and the May 1873 election, he briefly served as president of the Congress of Deputies in June 1873.

He moved away from Spain after the 3 January 1874 coup of Pavía, yet he ultimately returned to the country to establish in Astillero, Santander, for his later years. Having become blind, and his health becoming deteriorated, he died on 29 October 1880.
