= Barcelona Weavers Association =

First union in Spain

The Barcelona Weavers Association (Spanish: Asociación de Tejedores de Barcelona) was an association of weavers of cotton from Barcelona (Catalonia, Spain) and neighboring towns. It was the first union in the labor movement in Spain.

Founded clandestinely in the summer of 1839 and officially established in 1840 as a mutual aid society, it was banned several times because the right of association was not recognised during the reign of Isabella II, but it continued to operate under various guises.

== Background ==
In the 1830s, Catalonia was the only place in Spain with a modern industry, and partly as a result, it experienced significant social and labor conflict, mainly involving workers producing cotton textiles. During these years, the first attempts to form workers' societies occurred, as evidenced by repeated complaints to the Factory Commission by employers against "disobedient workers" or "ungrateful workers" and against "a sort of plot to demand wage increases"—a reference to what would later be called a strike—demonstrating, according to Manuel Tuñón de Lara, "a new class consciousness, characterized by workers feeling the need to associate to achieve" their labor or wage goals.

Initially, these associations were temporary with specific goals, but the workers' commissions formed to discuss grievances with employers asked the captain general of Catalonia to authorize them as permanent associations.

== Development ==
In February 1839, a Royal Order was issued authorising the formation of mutual aid and benefit societies. The Association was established on September 26, 1840, as the "Sociedad Mutua de Tejedores de Barcelona," presided over by Joan Munts. The first assembly of the society was held on December 8. It had probably already been formed unofficially in the summer of 1839 and had about 3,000 members evidenced by the a proclamation by the Civil Governor of Barcelona on May 23, 1840, banning "subscriptions or meetings to form associations" without prior notice to the authorities.

The articles of association included the following. Chapter 4 stated that when employers attempted to reduce wages "even by just one eighth," workers should leave the workshops. Article 36 added: "Any member, regardless of class, who agrees with the master to lengthen the fabrics or lower the wage will be considered disobedient and brought to trial by the two boards." Article 8 provided for the expulsion of the society member who "in whole or in part does not comply with the provisions."

In the autumn of 1840, social tension increased. Sources from the time noted "the disagreements and disturbances recorded for some time between manufacturers and workers, resulting in the closure of many factories." Some industrialists attributed the conflicts "to a hidden hand, possibly paid by foreigners, to destroy Catalan industry." To address this situation, an arbitration commission was created in November, composed of representatives of employers and workers. However, workers led by Juan Munts resigned in March 1841, considering it ineffective.

The Weavers' Society spread outside Barcelona, reaching 15,000 members, 7,000 from the capital and 8,000 from the surrounding towns, and served as a model for the establishment of societies in other trades, such as spinners and dyers. On September 26, 1841, it celebrated its first anniversary, attended by workers and their families.

However, the government of General Espartero ordered workers' societies to strictly adhere to their protective and relief purposes, threatening prison sentences for those who constrained "the free contracting of workers and employers" and forbidding unauthorised meetings. Increased tension culminated in the prohibition of the Association on December 9, 1841, a decision applauded by the Factory Commission in a letter sent to General Espartero, thanking him for addressing their request "to stop the evils that threaten these factories with the organization of the so-called Society of Laborers." But the Association responded with an appeal published on December 22 in the “Diario de Barcelona” which stated:

Our association does not need anyone's approval or disapproval; the rights granted to us by nature and the law are sufficient, ... our association is a voluntary and reciprocal bond that is not subject to dissolution...

A few days later, they sought the support of the city council and finally achieved their goal when, on March 29, 1842, an Order was issued by Espartero authorising the Association again, "on the condition that it be apolitical and local." Thus, they were able to celebrate their second anniversary, which was preceded by a manifesto dated May 6, 1842, signed by Joan Munts, Josep Sugrañes, and Pedro Vicheto, stating that the Association's establishment had opened a new era: "We showed those who pretended to believe and wanted us to understand that they were doing us a favour by providing work, that we are a part of the social chain, and they owe us even more thanks."

After the November 1842 uprising in Barcelona, which was crushed by Espartero, who ordered the bombardment of the city, and in which many workers participated, the Captain General of Catalonia accused the "Mutual Protection Society of Weavers of both sexes... founded in 1840 under the sole and apparent character of a philanthropic association of mutual relief" of being responsible for many of the events and, on January 16, 1843, declared it dissolved and also banned "any other association of any other branch of industry." But the Association continued its activity under the cover of the "Cotton Weavers' Industrial Company," constituted by the cooperative workshops organized by the weavers the previous year.

The "clandestine" operation of the legally dissolved Association resurfaced after the end of the "Jamancia" revolt in Barcelona between September and November 1843, in which workers again actively participated. This time, the Association's president, Joan Munts, commanded one of the companies formed by the rebels. Thus, in the first meeting held by the Captain General with the authorities and corporations of Barcelona, the existence of "a Weavers' Association for mutual aid or charitable purposes, without any political involvement..." was discussed.

The weavers' association continued to operate "clandestinely" in the following years, as evidenced by its mention in October 1845 by the Civil Governor of Barcelona to resolve a labour dispute and in 1850 by a decree from the governor threatening "unauthorised societies" with bringing their members before the courts under laws against secret societies. Another decree also threatened those who "form coalitions with the aim of stopping work." In 1852, a new decree, this time from the captain general, warned perpetrators of disorder and "crime" that they would be judged by military commissions. The following year the prohibition of "coalitions"—the term then used to refer to strikes was reiterated.

== See also ==
- History of the cotton industry in Catalonia
- Origins of the labor movement in Spain

== Bibliography ==
- López Alonso, Carmen (1992). "La pobreza en el pensamiento político: España, primera mitad del siglo XIX" [Poverty in political thought: Spain, first half of the 19th century]. Historia Social (in Spanish) (13). Valencia: Fundación Instituto de Historia Social. ISSN 0214-2570. JSTOR 40340562.
- Tuñón de Lara, Manuel (1977). El movimiento obrero en la historia de España. I.1832-1899 [The workers movement in the history of Spain. I. 1832-1899] (2nd ed.). Barcelona: Laia. ISBN 84-7222-331-0.
- Mestre i Campi, Jesús (1998). "Associació Mútua d'Obrers de la Indústria Cotonera". Diccionari d'Història de Catalunya [Dictionary of the History of Catalunya] (in Catalan). Edicions 62. ISBN 84-297-3521-6. OCLC 1248978749.
- Pons, Marc (15 July 2018). "1855: "Association or death", the story of Catalonia's first general strike". ElNational.cat. Grup les Noticies de Catalunya.
- Pons, Marc (9 May 2017). "Mutua de obreros de la industria algodonera, el precedente más remoto de la Seguridad Social" [Mutual insurance for workers in the cotton industry, the oldest precedent of Social Security]. ElNational.cat. Grup les Noticies de Catalunya.
