= Tortosa Pact =

The Federal Tortosa Pact, or simply, Tortosa Pact (Catalan: Pacte Federal de Tortosa or Pacte de Tortosa), was an ideological manifesto and organizational project from Republican and Federal forces of Aragon, the Balearic Islands, Catalonia and the Valencia region, signed in Tortosa on May 18, 1869. The signing of the pact was one of the first practical expressions of federalism, while still rejecting separatism.

== Text ==
... Aragon, Catalonia and Valencia, united by their topographical situation, united in their most cherished interests, united by their historical memories, similar if not equal in character and customs, worthy equals in their passion for freedom; are called by their nature, to march united, to live allied and to fulfill together the high provincial destinies of our race.

We unite to resist tyranny and as Aragonese, Catalans and Valencians, invoking in our favor honorable historical antecedents, we rightly expect that our firm resolution will be worthy of its due importance. (...) (...)

1º. The citizens gathered here agree that the three ancient provinces of Aragon, Catalonia and Valencia, including the Balearic Islands, are united and allied for all that concerns the conduct of the Republican party and the cause of the Revolution, without in any way inferring from this that they intend to separate from the rest of Spain.

2º. Likewise, they state that the form of government they believe to be most convenient for Spain is the Federal Democratic Republic, with all its legitimate and natural consequences. (...)

== Subsequent developments ==
The pact led to similar pacts such as those of Córdoba, the two Castiles, Valladolid, the Galician-Asturian pact in Santiago de Compostela, the Basque-Navarran pact at Eibar and lastly the Madrid Agreement of 30 July 1869.

When the First Spanish Republic was established (1873), there were different attempts in Barcelona to proclaim a Catalan State within a Spanish Federal Republic.

== See also ==
- Crown of Aragon
