= Jamància =

1843 insurrection in Spain

- Part of the Age of Revolution
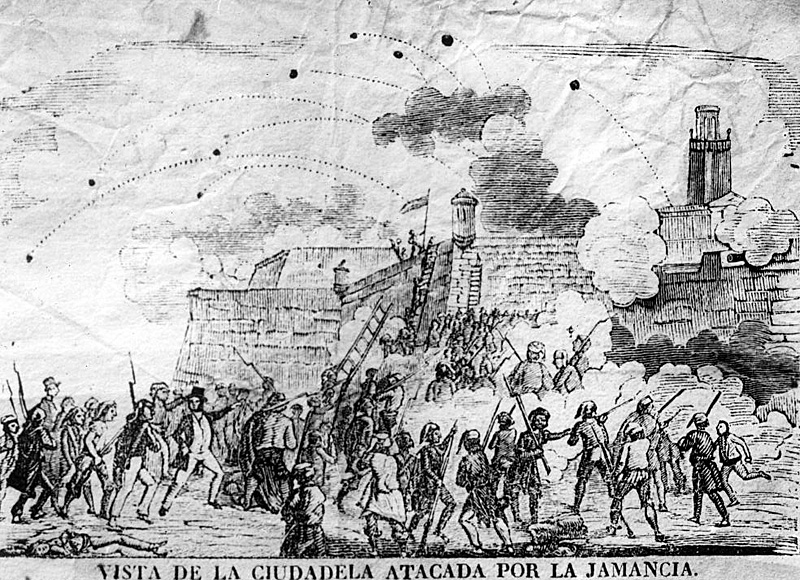
- Date: September 1 - November 19, 1843
- Location: Catalonia, Spain
- Outcome: Submission of Barcelona to the federal Spanish government

La Jamància was a federalist, democratic, and popular insurrection that took place in Barcelona, Kingdom of Spain, between September and November 1843. It is considered the first popular uprising against the centralized liberal Spanish state, and its suppression marked the submission of Barcelona to the authority of the Madrid government. The name is derived from the Caló word jamar (to eat), a disparaging allusion to the volunteer fighters who were said to have enlisted in the battalions chiefly for provision of free food.

== Background ==
Two earlier uprisings took place in 1843 following the 1842 Bombardment of Barcelona reflecting Catalan frustrations with the central government which had been operating a regency for twelve-year-old Isabel II. The first of these, beginning on June 3, 1843, aimed to bring down the regency government of General Baldomero Espartero and the second, in mid-August, turned against the successor government of Joaquín María López over its failure to honour the commitments made to Barcelona's Central Junta in exchange for Catalan support during Espartero's overthrow.

The Central Junta had been formed as a governing body to coordinate the anti-Espartero movement, but once Espartero fell the new federal government progressively stripped it of executive and legislative power, reducing it to a merely consultative role. This maneuver deeply antagonized Catalan opinion. López's government subsequently dissolved the Spanish Senate, which was widely regarded as an unconstitutional act, and called elections to the Cortes on terms Catalans perceived as a betrayal of the compact struck with General Francisco Serrano. The rallying cry of the discontented became "The Constitution of 1837, Isabel II, and the Central Junta."

In the meantime, the interim Captain General of Catalonia, Jaime Arbuthnot, had taken refuge in the Ciutadella Fortress, abandoning the city and the Barcelona Royal Shipyard which was stocked with weapons. A popular junta armed the 1st Battalion of Barcelona Volunteers under Juan Castells, which seized the Royal Shipyard and appointed Francisco Torras y Riera as its governor. The arrival of Brigadier Joan Prim as military governor from Madrid appeared briefly to offer the prospect of a resolution, but tensions continued to mount.

== Revolt ==
=== The Insurrection Begins ===
On the night of September 1, 1843, the 3rd Battalion of Catalan Volunteers breached the city walls and entered Barcelona declaring open rebellion and entrenching themselves in the Plaça de Sant Jaume. By September 3, the city was effectively in the hands of the insurgents who fortified the city centre and armed themselves with artillery from the Royal Shipyard. The rebels constituted themselves as the Junta Suprema Provisional de la Província de Barcelona, presided over by Colonel Antoni Baiges and composed of civic and military figures including José Maria Bosch, Rafael Degollada, Juan Castells, and Agustín Reverter. From the balcony of the Casa de la Diputació they called upon the other provinces of Spain to join the uprising and invited each judicial district to send two representatives to the Junta.

The legitimate authorities were paralyzed as the Captain General was confined to the Ciutadella Fortress with barely enough troops to defend it, the Provincial Deputation showed no sign of activity, and the city council declared itself neutral. On September 4, the president of the Junta Antoni Baiges was shot dead before the sea wall, his body displayed at the Casa de la Diputació for twenty-four hours. Rafael Degollada assumed the presidency. That same day, Brigadier Prim withdrew to the town of Gràcia, outside the city walls.

=== Bombardment and Military Operations ===
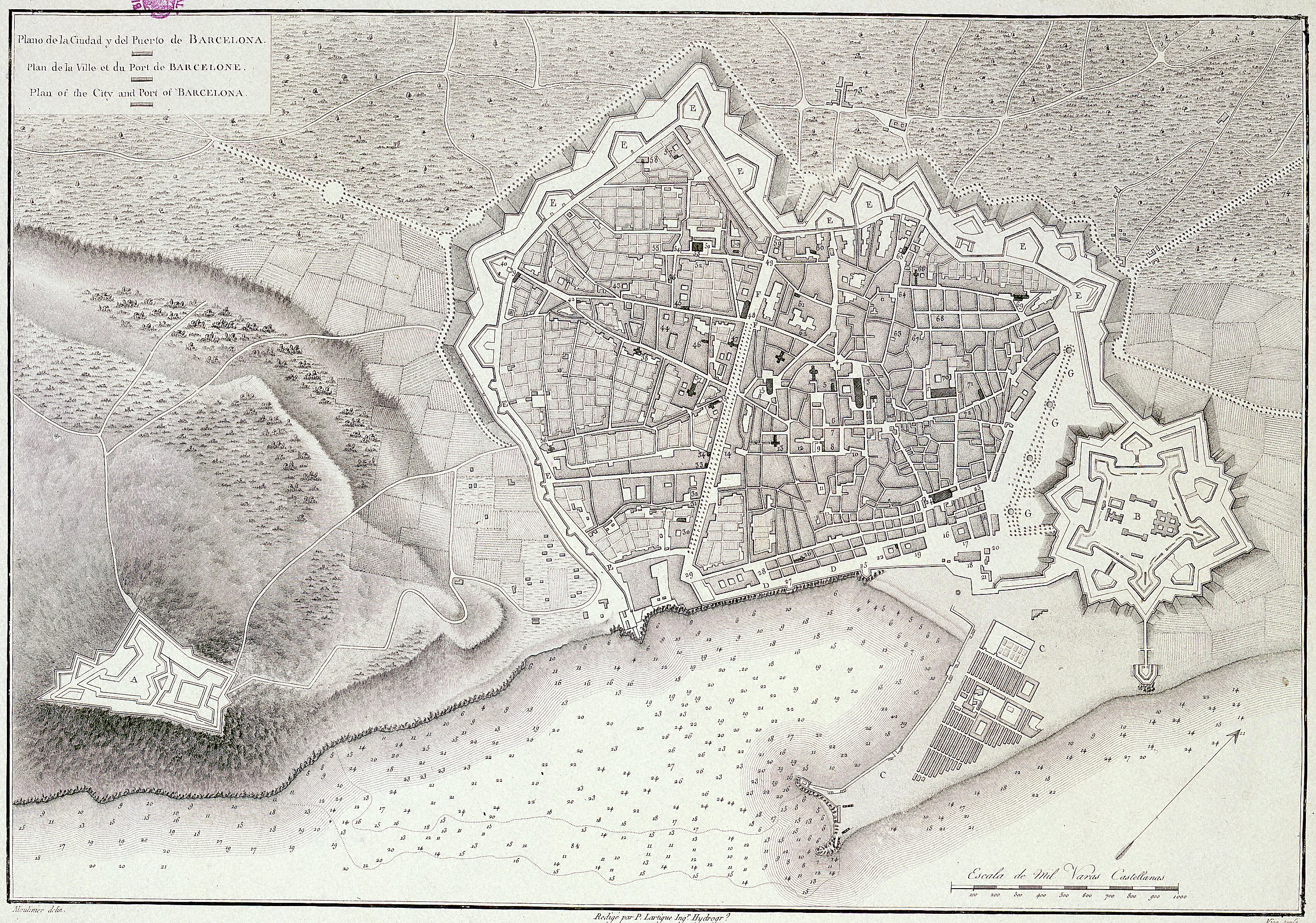
Nineteenth-century map of Barcelona showing the city flanked by Montjuïc to the southwest (left) and the Ciutadella to the northeast (right).

On September 7, the castle of Montjuïc entered the conflict, opening fire on the Royal Shipyard with over one hundred cannon rounds. The Ciutadella Fortress too maintained a steady bombardment of rebel positions. The insurgents had established artillery batteries at several points along the city walls, and fierce exchanges continued over the following weeks. Between October 22 and 24 alone, government forces fired some 4,825 projectiles into the city, including large numbers of exploding shells and bombs that caused considerable loss of life and widespread destruction.

At the same time as the siege, the Junta sought to expand the revolt beyond the city. General Ametller arrived at Sants on September 10 at the head of a mixed force of around 1,000–1,500 men and was proclaimed Marshal of the Field and Captain General of Catalonia by the Junta, which simultaneously declared Joan Prim a traitor. On the night of September 11, a rebel column of over 2,000 men under Ametller made a surprise night march to Sant Andreu del Palomar, capturing some eighty officers and an equal number of soldiers. Ametller then advanced towards Mataró, 30 km (19 mi) northeast of Barcelona, where he was joined by 800 men from the province of Girona under Francisco Ballera.

=== Suppression ===
Prim counterattacked and on September 19 he led a column of 3,000 men against the rebel forces at Sant Andreu. Although the terrain and a lack of cavalry hampered his initial advance, he defeated the rebels in a second assault on September 22, routing the junta's force of 1,500 men while taking 200 prisoners and inflicting around 200 casualties. Rebel columns operating in the provinces were progressively neutralized.

On September 25, the newly appointed Captain General Laureano Sanz took command of the government's siege on Barcelona and declared his commitment to observe the Constitution of 1837. On September 26, Prim captured Mataró after hours of fighting, taking some 500 prisoners and inflicting over 150 killed. By early October, most of the provincial pronunciamientos in Almería, Granada, Zaragoza, and parts of Galicia and Andalusia had been suppressed.

In Barcelona, on October 1 Sanz issued an edict forbidding the entry of any person or foodstuffs into the city under pain of death, causing severe shortages of meat, rice, salt, firewood. By November, the city's population had fallen to roughly 50,000, approximately one quarter of its pre-revolt level, and around 17,000 people were relying daily on the Junta's soup kitchens. The Junta resorted to expropriating goods and funds from institutions and merchants, issuing promissory documents in exchange and releasing prisoners in return for enlistment in its paramilitary.

=== Capitulation ===
On November 8, the Spanish Cortes declared Queen Isabel II of age, by 193 votes to 16, removing any remaining constitutional justification for the Junta's resistance. Negotiations over the terms of surrender continued through November, even as the bombardment persisted. On November 17, five commissioners were sent to the Ciutadella Fortress to negotiate capitulation. When talks stalled, Captain General Sanz issued an ultimatum on November 19 that either the agreed terms be confirmed by midnight or he would accept nothing less than unconditional surrender and resume the attack at dawn. By ten o'clock that night, the commissioners had confirmed capitulation. At noon on November 20, a regiment entered the city and took over all military posts and at one o'clock, Sanz himself entered at the head of approximately 6,000 soldiers. The members of the Junta Suprema were given passports to Port-Vendres and embarked on the French warship Papin on the night of 20 November. In total, over 12,000 projectiles had been fired into Barcelona during the course of the siege.

== Legacy ==
La Jamància was the last of the bullangues, a series of popular urban uprisings that had shaken Barcelona between 1835 and 1843. The revolt was one of the first instances of a working-class and popular movement in Spain raising arms not merely against a particular government but against the principle of centralized liberal statehood. The federalist and democratic demands of the Junta prefigured the political currents that would resurface in Catalonia and throughout Spain in subsequent decades.

The defeat confirmed the military superiority of the Moderate Party's state-building project and extinguished organized Catalan resistance to political centralization for a generation. The ease with which Barcelona's population was brought to submission through bombardment and blockade established a precedent for the use of overwhelming military force against urban popular movements. The figure of Joan Prim, who commanded the government's field operations with considerable success and was decorated with the Grand Cross of San Fernando for his victory at Mataró, emerged from the conflict with an enhanced military reputation that would carry him to national prominence in subsequent years.
