= Catalan State (1873) =

Short lived state in Catalonia and the Balearic Islands

Catalan State Estado Catalán (Spanish) Estat Català (Catalan)
- 1873
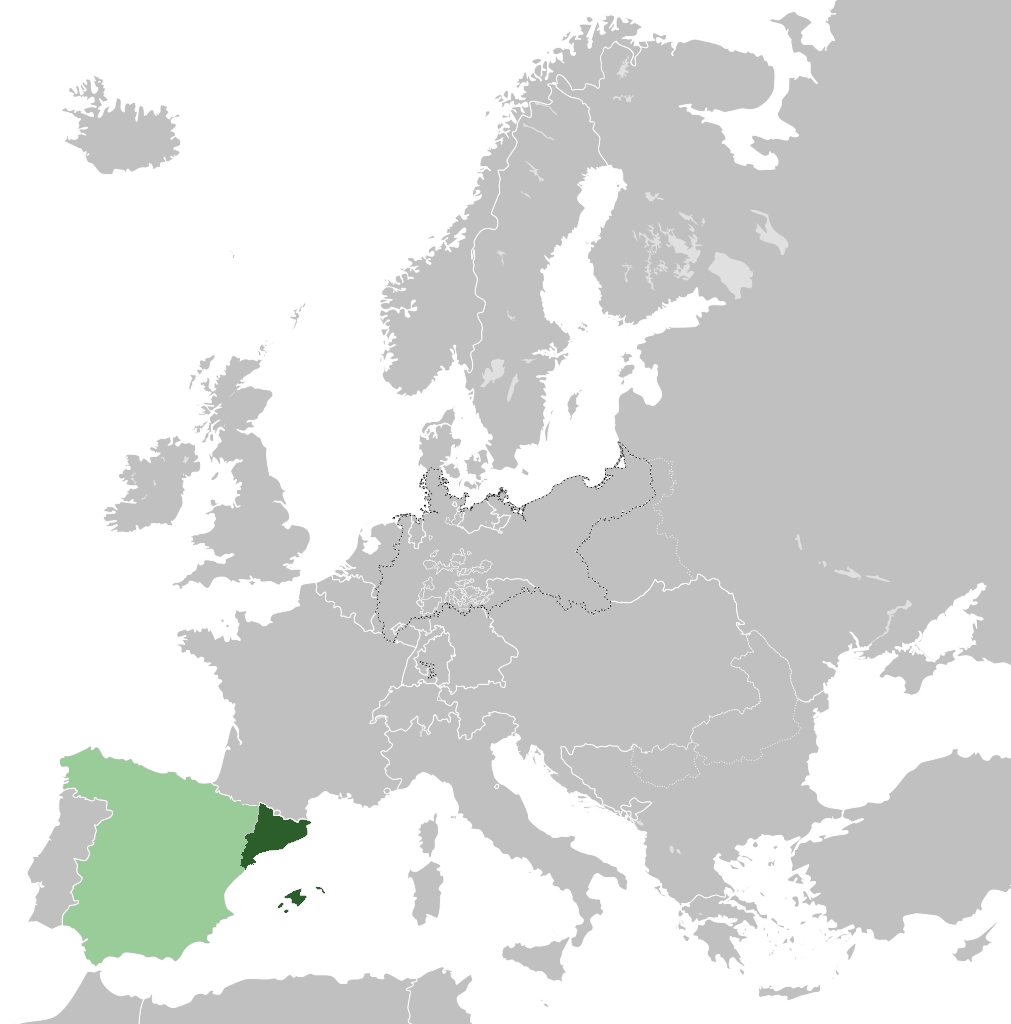
- Location of the Catalan State within Europe.
- Status: Federated state within Spanish Republic
- Capital: Barcelona
- Common languages: Spanish (official); Catalan
- Demonym: Catalan
- Government: Provisional federated state
- Provisional President
  - 1873: Baldomer Lostau
- Historical era: Democratic Sexennium
  - Established: 9 March 1873
  - Disestablished: 11 March 1873
- Currency: Spanish peseta (de facto)
Preceded by	Succeeded by
First Spanish Republic	First Spanish Republic
- Today part of: Spain ∟ Catalonia ∟ Balearic Islands

The Catalan State (Spanish: Estado Catalán; Catalan: Estat Català) was a short-lived state proclaimed in 1873, during the First Spanish Republic, by the Provincial Deputation of Barcelona. It included the four provinces of Catalonia and the Balearic Islands.

== History ==
On 18 May 1869 the representatives of the federal-republican committees of Aragon, Catalonia, Valencia and the Balearic Islands had signed the Federal Pact of Tortosa to work together in order to establish the Spanish Federal Republic, making it clear that they would defend the unity of Spain.

The Catalan State within the Spanish Federal Republic was proclaimed in Barcelona on 9 March 1873. It was a republican federalist proclamation, not a separatist one. The Provincial Deputation of Barcelona elected the republican federalist Baldomer Lostau i Prats as the provisional president of the State. After the president of the First Spanish Republic, Estanislao Figueras, and the head of the federal party, Francesc Pi i Margall, promised the dissolution of the Spanish army in Catalonia, the proclamation was revoked.

== Flag ==
A Spanish-language newspaper published in Paris, El Correo de Ultramar, quoting the Diario de Barcelona, described a flag flown from Barcelona City Hall on 12 February 1873 (the day after the proclamation of the Spanish Republic) as follows:

The federal flag of Catalonia, which was flown from the City Hall, was red with a white triangle, in which was written in red letters, "Democracia." Surrounding it were several white stars, and in large letters the word "Cataluña".

Le Monde illustré described the carrying of red flags in Madrid as well as Barcelona on 11 February, and illustrated one such flag with a white triangle in the centre.
