= 1865 Barcelona Workers' Congress =

Political convention

- Native name: Congrés Obrer de Barcelona de 1865
- Date: December 24–26, 1865
- Venue: Salón Universal
- Location: Barcelona
- Also known as: First Barcelona Workers' Congress
- Cause: Final crisis of the reign of Elizabeth II
- Organised by: El Obrero
- Participants: Catalan workers' societies
- Outcome: The establishment of a federation of workers' societies; The formation of cooperatives; A petition for freedom of association

The 1865 Barcelona Workers Congress was held in December —in September, according to Manuel Tuñón de Lara - from 1865 in Barcelona (Spain) and brought together 22 Catalan workers' societies, taking advantage of a moment tolerance during the final crisis of the reign of Elizabeth II (1863-1868). It was the first workers' congress to be held in Spain, although it was limited to Catalonia.

== Background ==
After the Progressive Biennium, workers' societies were once again banned, although some continued to exist underground. There was some initiative to address the social question by members and sympathizers of the Progressive Party in Catalonia as the foundation in 1862 of the Catalan Working Class Athenaeum. The situation changed in 1864 when the Captain General of Catalonia, Domingo Dulce y Garay, in fact allowed the workers' societies to function, which opened a period of freedom, during which two newspapers of some importance appeared, El Obrero and La Asociación.

The first issue of El Obrero was released on September 4, 1864, directed by Antoni Gusart i Vila, with the aim of defending "the interests of the proletariat" and achieving the right of workers' association, both for the "resistance to capital" and to form "workers' societies applied to production and consumption", that is, to form cooperatives, a movement that gained strength by those years and that also gave legal cover to the resistance societies. The idea of holding a Congress in Barcelona to coordinate the existing workers' societies came from El Obrero. The editors of El Obrero thought that the congress would serve to "promote the cooperative movement, which, implanted in England a few years ago, has spread rapidly throughout the European nations."

== Development ==
Chaired by Gusart and by various members of the editorial staff of El Obrero, the Congress was held from December 24 to 26, 1865 — or in September, according to other sources - at the Salón Universal in Barcelona. Some 300 delegates from twenty-two associations attended, according to Josep Termes. Forty, according to Tuñón de Lara. The agenda consisted of the following three points proposed by El Obrero:

1. Can the association redeem the proletarian, giving back to the worker the freedom of action that he lacks? If so, what is the course that societies should follow to avoid, as far as possible, the malaise of the working class, since up to now the situation has not improved?
2. Cooperative societies, what advantages do they bring to the associates and what are the probabilities of success?
3. Would it be advisable to establish a federation for the best success in operations and that would serve as a basis for the progressive progress of the societies?

The first important agreement that was reached was the formation of a federation of workers' societies and workers' centers in those places where there was more than one society, of which El Obrero would be its official organ. One of its objectives would be to propagate "the practice of cooperative societies." The second was to send a petition to the Government to recognize freedom of association, "since how many exhibitions have been addressed to the Cortes have been as many stones thrown into deep chasm." The "Exhibition" was published in El Obrero on January 7, 1866, with Gusart as the first signatory, followed by Ramón Cartañá, Miquel Martorell, Matías Fuster, Josep Morera, Josep Espinal and Josep Roig. The exhibition said, among other things, the following:

If the association of capitals has given the middle class the preponderance that it enjoys today, the effects of which are derived from the wise law of progress, the materially producing class must reach the position that corresponds to it as an integral part of the nation; There can be no doubt that the union and solidarity that the association carries with it is what will lead it to the achievement of such a just right.
[...]
The conditions to which our class is currently subjected are in extreme vexatious; the shortage of wages, the heavy burden of an unbearable work on our physical strength, considerably diminish the robustness of the producing arm and hundreds of our brothers die emaciated from pain in the middle of their existence.

Politics was not discussed in Congress, "nor was anyone allowed to speak about the state, nor would it have been allowed, as it was not the responsibility of the meeting."

== Bibliography ==
- Termes, Josep (1977). Anarquismo y sindicalismo en España. La Primera Internacional (1864-1881) (in Spanish). Barcelona: Crítica. ISBN 84-7423-023-3.
- Tuñón de Lara, Manuel (1977) [1972]. El movimiento obrero en la historia de España. I.1832-1899 (in Spanish) (2ª ed.). Barcelona: Laia. ISBN 84-7222-331-0.
