= Baldomer Lostau i Prats =

Spanish politician

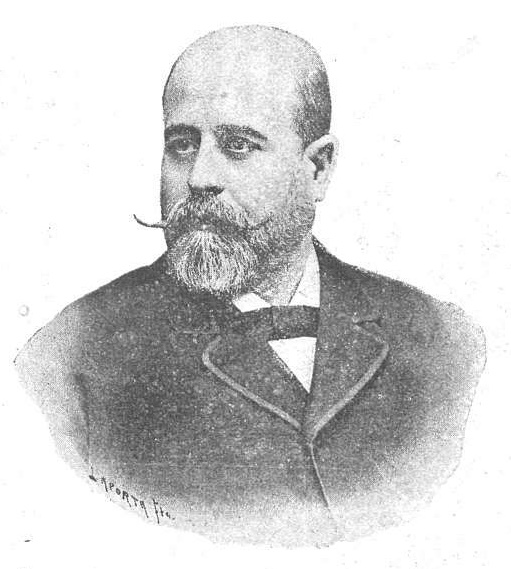
- Baldomer Lostau

Deputy of the Cortes
- In office 1893–1895
- Constituency: Vilafranca del Penedès

Baldomer Lostau i Prats (1846–1896) was a Spanish politician.

He was involved in the proclamation of a Catalan Republic in 1873.
