= Federal republicanism =

Ideology combining federal and republican forms of government

Federal republicanism is an ideology combining federalism and republicanism in a federal republic. Federalism is a mode of government combining a central or federal government with sub-national divisions such as provinces, states, cantons, and territories, etc., while dividing the powers of governing between the differing levels of governments. Republicanism is a political ideology that promotes the republican system of government, in which sovereignty resides in the people and their elected representatives, as opposed to hereditary monarchy or other forms of absolute personal power.

Federal republicanism emphasizes the idea of decentralized self-governance by the people as opposed to a monarchy governing a unitary state. It is founded on several key principles, including civic virtue, active political participation, civic education, the fight against corruption (anti-corruption), a preference for a balanced and mixed constitution, government limited by constitutional laws, freedom as non-domination, and a commitment to the rule of law and the common good. It has had different definitions and interpretations which vary significantly based on historical context, methodological approach, and location.

Federal republicanism typically advocates the division of powers between the federal government and the governments of the individual subdivisions. While each federal republic manages this division of powers differently, common matters relating to international affairs and treaties, security and defense, inter-state relations, and monetary policy are usually handled at the federal level, while matters such as infrastructure maintenance and education policy are usually handled at the regional or local level; however, views differ on what issues should be a federal competence, and subdivisions usually have sovereignty in some matters where the federal government does not have jurisdiction.

Most federal republics codify the division of powers between orders of government in a written constitutional document. The political differences between a federal republic and other federal states, especially federal monarchies under a parliamentary system of government, are largely a matter of legal form rather than political substance, as most federal states are democratic in structure if not practice with checks and balances. Federal states primarily contrast with unitary states, where the central government retains many of the powers that are delegated to the subdivisions in federal republics. While there are exceptions, the overall tendency is for federal republics to be larger, more populous, and more internally heterogeneous than unitary states, with such larger size and internal heterogeneity being more manageable in a federal system than in a unitary one.

== Concept ==
Federal republicanism is defined in contrast to a unitary republic, whereby the central government has complete sovereignty over all aspects of political life. This more decentralized structure helps to explain the tendency for more populous countries to operate as federal republics.

== Spain ==
Spanish federal republicanism originated in 19th century Spain and incorporates republicanism and advocates local associations of citizens and promotes citizen participation in public affairs. An important part being the concept of federalism, looking for the devolution or distribution and management to smaller administrative units to prevent governments with a strong central concentration of power. It was the prelude to cantonalism in the Glorious Revolution (Spain).

=== Relationship with anarchism ===
Anarchists have tended to feel close to Republican authors, e.g., Benjamin Tucker who wrote, "Anarchists are simply Jeffersonian democrats till the last consequences and without fear of it. They believe that 'the best government is that which governs least', and that which governs least does not govern at all", referring to quotes from Thomas Jefferson and Henry David Thoreau. Mikhail Bakunin and Pierre-Joseph Proudhon expressed their sympathies to the ideal of Jeffersonian democracy and proclaimed it to be close to the anarchist idea. Enrique Flores Magon tried to win over the Mexican public by claiming Thomas Jefferson was "an anarchist of his time".

Francesc Pi i Margall was claimed by the Spanish anarchists of his time. It was speculated that he drew his conception of federalism from the work Principle of Federation of the anarchist Pierre-Joseph Proudhon, although some experts argue that the ideas of Pi Margall were already outlined in his earlier writings prior to Proudhon's work.

== United States ==
The values and ideals of republicanism and federalism are foundational in the constitution and history of the United States. Political scientists and historians have described these central values as liberty and inalienable individual rights; recognizing the sovereignty of the people as the source of all authority in law; rejecting monarchy, aristocracy, and hereditary political power; virtue and faithfulness in the performance of civic duties; and intolerance of corruption. These values are based on those of Ancient Greco-Roman, Renaissance, and English models and ideas. Articulated in the writings of the Founding Fathers (particularly Thomas Jefferson, James Madison, and John Adams), they formed the intellectual basis for the American Revolution – the Declaration of Independence (1776), the Constitution (1787), and the Bill of Rights (1791), as well as the Gettysburg Address (1863).

Federalism is a form of political organization that seeks to divide power between local states and the government, distributing different powers at different levels to allow a degree of political independence in an overarching structure. In the United States, federalism was a political solution to the problems with the Articles of Confederation which gave little practical authority to the confederal government. For example, the Articles allowed the Congress of the Confederation the power to sign treaties and declare war, but it could not raise taxes to pay for an army and all major decisions required a unanimous vote.

In the United States Constitution, republic is mentioned once, in section four of Article Four, where it is stated: "The United States shall guarantee to every State in this Union a Republican Form of Government ...". The U.S. Constitution prohibits granting titles of nobility. Politicians and scholars have debated the connection of these values with issues like honest government, democracy, individualism, property rights, equality under the law, military service; as well as their compatibility with slavery, inequitable distribution of wealth, economic self-interest, limits on the rights of minorities, and national debt.

The first political party in the United States was the Federalist Party. Two major political parties in American history have used the term Republican in their name – the Republican Party of Thomas Jefferson (1793–1824; also known as the Jeffersonian Republican Party or the Democratic-Republican Party) and the Republican Party (founded in 1854 and named after the Jeffersonian party).

== See also ==
- Federalism
- Republicanism
- Glorious Revolution (Spain)
- Philosophical anarchism

== See also ==
- Federal monarchy – Federation of states with a single main monarch and different state leaders
- Form of government
- List of republics – History of governments with elected representatives
