= Giuseppe Fanelli =

Italian anarchist (1827–1877)

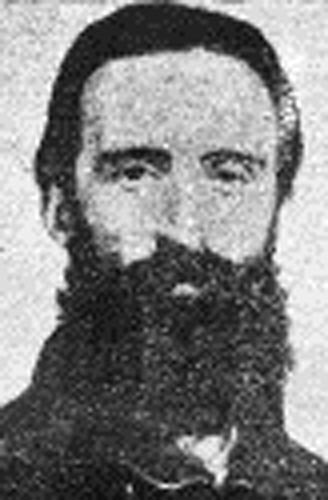
- Born: 13 October 1827; Naples, Kingdom of the Two Sicilies
- Died: 5 January 1877 (aged 49); Naples, Kingdom of Italy

Giuseppe Fanelli (13 October 1827 – 5 January 1877) was an Italian revolutionary anarchist, best known for his influence on Italian anarchism and Spanish anarchism and his tour of Spain in 1868, introducing the anarchist ideas of Mikhail Bakunin to Spain.

== Life and revolutionary path ==
Fanelli was born in Naples, Italy on 13 October 1827. At the age of 18, he enrolled in Giovine Italia, a political movement with the goal to create a united Italian republic.

He was active in the insurrectionary, united Italian republic Young Italy movement and fought in the Milan insurrection of the 1848 revolution. He went on to fight alongside Garibaldi's Redshirts in the Expedition of the Thousand in Sicily in 1860; he also fought in the Polish uprising in 1863. He was elected to Italian Parliament in November 1865. In 1866, he fought in the Third Italian War of Independence against the Austrian Empire, which at the time controlled, occupied, and subjugated large parts of Northern Italy.

Fanelli met Bakunin at Ischia in 1866. In October 1868, Bakunin sponsored Fanelli to travel to Barcelona to share his leftist libertarian anarchist visions and recruit revolutionists to the International Workingmen's Association. Fanelli’s trip to Spain and the meeting he organised during his travels provided the catalyst for the Spanish anarchist movement, the largest workers' and peasants' movement in modern Spain and the largest anarchist movement in modern Europe.

Fanelli's tour took him first to Barcelona, where he met and stayed with Élisée Reclus. Reclus and Fanelli were at odds over Reclus' friendships with Spanish republicans, and Fanelli soon left Barcelona for Madrid. Fanelli stayed in Madrid until the end of January 1869, conducting meetings to introduce Spanish workers, including Anselmo Lorenzo, to the First International. In February 1869, Fanelli left Madrid, journeying home via Barcelona. While in Barcelona again, he met with painter Josep Lluís Pellicer and his cousin, Rafael Farga Pellicer, along with others who were to play an important role establishing the International in Barcelona.

== Death ==
Fanelli died of tuberculosis in Naples in 1877.

== Perceptions of others in regard to Fanelli ==
Fanelli was a tall man with a kind and grave expression, a thick black beard and large black expressive eyes which flashed like lightning or took on the appearance of kindly compassion according to the sentiments which dominated him. His voice had a metallic tone and was susceptible to all the inflexions appropriate to what he was saying, passing rapidly from accents of anger and menace against tyrants and exploiters to take on those of suffering, regret and consolation when he spoke of the pains of the exploited, either as one who without suffering them himself understands them, or as one who through his altruistic feelings delights in presenting the ultra-revolutionary ideas of peace and fraternity. He spoke in French and Italian, but we could understand his expressive mimicry and follow his speech.

— Anselmo Lorenzo, Spanish Anarchist, cit. in H.M. Enzensberger, "Der kurze Sommer der Anarchie"

For Fanelli, revolution was a way of life, not merely a distant theoretical goal, and his latter years as a deputy were spent on the railways, preaching social revolution during the day in peasant villages throughout Italy, later returning to sleep in the train at night.

— Murray Bookchin, The Spanish Anarchists: The Heroic Years, 1868–1936

== Sources ==
- Bookchin, Murray (1998). The Spanish Anarchists: The Heroic Years, 1868–1936. Canada: AK Press. ISBN 1-873176-04-X.
- Leier, Mark (2006). Bakunin: The Creative Passion. Seven Stories Press. ISBN 978-1-58322-894-4.
- Whelehan, Niall (2009). "Fanelli, Giuseppe (1826–1877)". In Ness, Immanuel (ed.). The International Encyclopedia of Revolution and Protest. pp. 1–2. doi:10.1002/9781405198073.wbierp0536. ISBN 9781405198073.
