= Spanish general strike =

Spanish general strike may refer to:

- 1917 Spanish general strike
- 1919 Spanish general strike
- 1988 Spanish general strike
- 2010 Spanish general strike
- 2017 Catalan general strike
