= Xtalk =

Xtalk may refer to:

- x:talk, a UK-based project for migrant sex workers
- xTalk, a family of scripting languages based on Apple's HyperTalk
- Crosstalk, a kind of signal interference
