= 1855 Catalan general strike =

General strike

- Part of the Bienio progresista
- Date: 2–10 July, 1855
- Location: Barcelona, Spain; 41°22′58″N 02°10′37″E
- Result: Strike ended in exchange for the promise that the government would authorize mixed arbitration panels

The 1855 Catalan general strike was a general strike that took place in 1855 after the execution of Josep Barceló Cassadó. It was the first general strike in Spanish history, resulting in mass demonstrations and the death of a factory manager in Sants, Barcelona.

== Bienio Progresista ==
The rise of Spanish liberalism in the 19th century also brought with it factionalism. Spanish liberals were split into two main factions: the Moderate Party, which represented the liberal right wing, and the Progressive Party, which represented the liberal left wing. The Moderate Party, led by Ramón María Narváez, held power from 1844 to 1854, a period known as the década moderada (lit. 'Moderate Decade'). The decada moderada ended with the Revolution of 1854, which saw the Progressives under Leopoldo O'Donnell execute a coup with British and French support to put Baldomero Espartero in power, ushering in the bienio progresista (lit. 'Progressive Biennium').

The Revolution saw many Catalan workers fighting on behalf of the Progressives, particularly in Barcelona. These workers saw progressivism as one of the key tenets of organized labor, alongside freedom of association and collective bargaining, and expected the new Progressive government to work on their behalf.

== Origins of the strike ==
At the beginning of the 19th century, two-thirds of Spain's workers were employed in agriculture. By the mid-1850s, however, Catalonia in general and Barcelona in particular experienced a widespread industrial revolution. By the mid-19th century, over half of all Catalans lived in urban industrial areas, with many working in the nascent textile industry.

These workers were organized in various worker's associations and mutual aid societies, with thirty associations forming a "central council." The Weavers' Association was particularly influential. In July 1854, they participated in the conflict of the selfactinas, which saw workers mobilizing against mechanization in the textile industry, leading to the ban of automatic spinning machines, which workers viewed as being disruptive and demeaning. Josep Barceló Cassadó, a local weaver and labor leader, came to prominence during this conflict and would go on to play a major role in the 1855 general strike.

The government initially tolerated worker's associations, praising them for their patriotism and support for the liberal cause. However, in 1855, the authorities began to impose limits on organized labor due to pressure from moderates and what they perceived as the failure of organized labor to effectively mediate conflict. In February 1855, the authorities arrested a group of weavers attempting to organize workers in factories around Barcelona, and in May, the government rescinded the ban on automatic spinning machines.

Many organized workers, who had expected the Progressive government to recognize the right to free assembly and fight on their behalf, felt betrayed by the government's actions. The straw that broke the camel's back was the execution of Josep Barceló, who was arrested by Juan Zapatero y Navas, the new captain-general of Catalonia. He was executed on 6 June, leading to waves of protests throughout Barcelona. Soon after, worker's associations were banned altogether, collective agreements were annulled, and several prominent labor leaders were imprisoned, with some being deported to Cuba.

== Strike ==
In response to Barceló's execution and to the ban, a declaration went out on 2 July calling the workers to strike. The demands of the workers included the right to free association, stable working hours, mixed arbitration panels, the end of free dismissal, and the right of workers to be admitted into the national militia, which had been rescinded in the fear that they would disturb the peace.

Thousands of workers participated in the strike, with major activity occurring both in and around Barcelona. On the first day of the strike, two managers at the El Vapor Vell factory in Sants were attacked. One, Josep Sol i Padrís, was killed and the other, Domènec Ramis, was seriously injured. Another attack took place in Igualada against manufacturer Ramon Godó and his family, but otherwise, the strike was peaceful, with workers taking to the streets bearing flags with the slogans "Viva Espartero. Association or death. Bread and work."

On 4 July, two commissions, one sent by the workers and the other sent by the Barcelona City Council, went to negotiate with Espartero in Madrid. Espartero refused to countenance the workers' demands until the strike was called off, instead sending an envoy, Colonel Saravia, directly to Barcelona to demand that the workers end the strike in exchange for the establishment of mixed arbitration panels. He also sent troops to support Zapatero, who was locked inside the local fort at Atrazanas and in desperate need of reinforcements. On 9 July, Zapatero's forces occupied the city, issuing mass arrests against the strikers.

On 10 July, with Zapatero on the offensive and strike funds running low, the workers agreed to end the strike in exchange for the government's promise to make a law authorizing mixed arbitration panels. By 12 July, the strike was over and work continued as usual.

== Aftermath and legacy ==
The end of the strike led to the proposal of the "Manufacturing Industries Bill" in the Cortes Generales, which authorized mixed arbitration panels but failed to give workers adequate representation. It also outlawed unions entirely. The bill was roundly rejected by both workers and employers and eventually withdrawn. The end of the strike also led to the continued repression of organized labor by Zapatero, who maintained his position after the strike and continued to target labor leaders even after the bienio progresista ended in 1856.

Despite these setbacks, workers continued to push for organization. A worker's newspaper, El Eco de la Clase Obrera, began publication in Madrid in August 1855. The paper, which was overseen by typographer Ramon Simó i Badia, managed to gain over 30,000 signatures in support of a manifesto to be delivered before the Cortes demanding the right to free association. Many more manifestos followed, expressing frustration with the government and disillusionment with the progressive regime.

As labor unions expanded in the next century, strikes became commonplace in Catalonia, with subsequent general strikes taking place in 1901, 1902, 1913, and 1919. These strikes were influenced ideologically by anarchism and socialism, with Catalan anarchists calling for general strikes repeatedly during the early 20th century.

== See also ==
- List of strikes in Spain
