= Conflict of the selfactinas =

Dispute in the Spanish textile industry (1854)

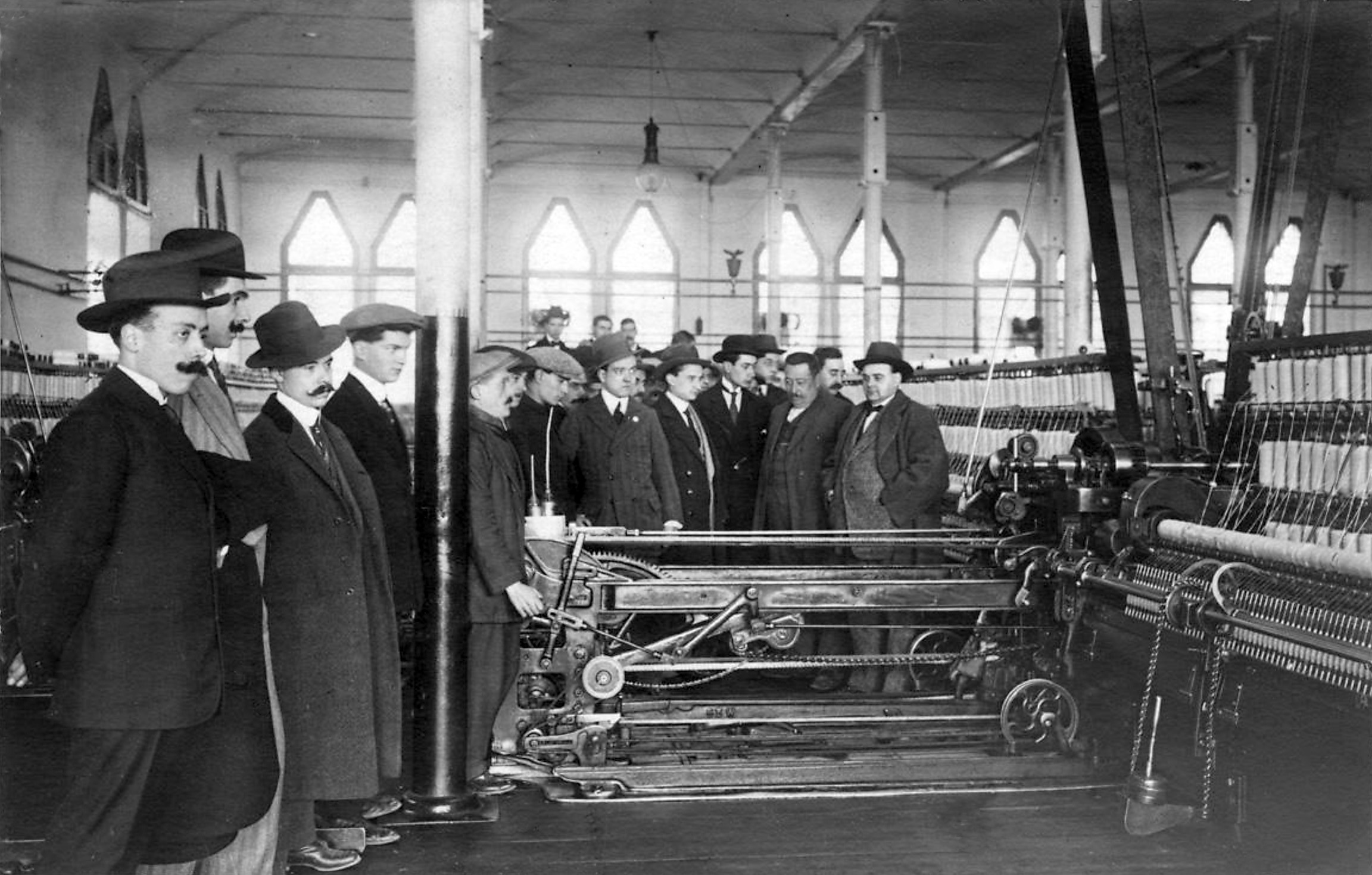
Students visiting the Fàbrica Trinxet in Barcelona in 1914 examining a self-acting spinning mule

The Conflict of the Selfactinas refers to Luddite actions that occurred in Barcelona during the month of July 1854 against the mechanisation of spinning with the self-acting or fully automatic mule held responsible for rising unemployment. The Conflict represents the first attempt in Spain to regulate child labor and to improve the conditions of workers and led directly to the first general strike in Spain. It was also the first time in Spanish history that "government authorities accepted the representative role of work's associations".

== Background ==
The first violent responses to the introduction of machinery in Spain were in textile production and occurred in Alcoy, Valencia in 1821 (against the automation of wool carding and spinning), in Camprodón, Catalonia in 1823, in Barcelona in 1835 and in Igualada, Catalonia in 1847.

Since 1840, workers had begun organising into mutual associations such as the Barcelona Weavers Association and used strike action as their main weapon but with limited success due partly to the widespread availability of arms.

Completely automatic (self-acting) spinning machines had been first introduced into Catalonia around 1844 and by 1849 accounted for 91,468 spindles, and in 1854 more than 200,000.

== Development ==
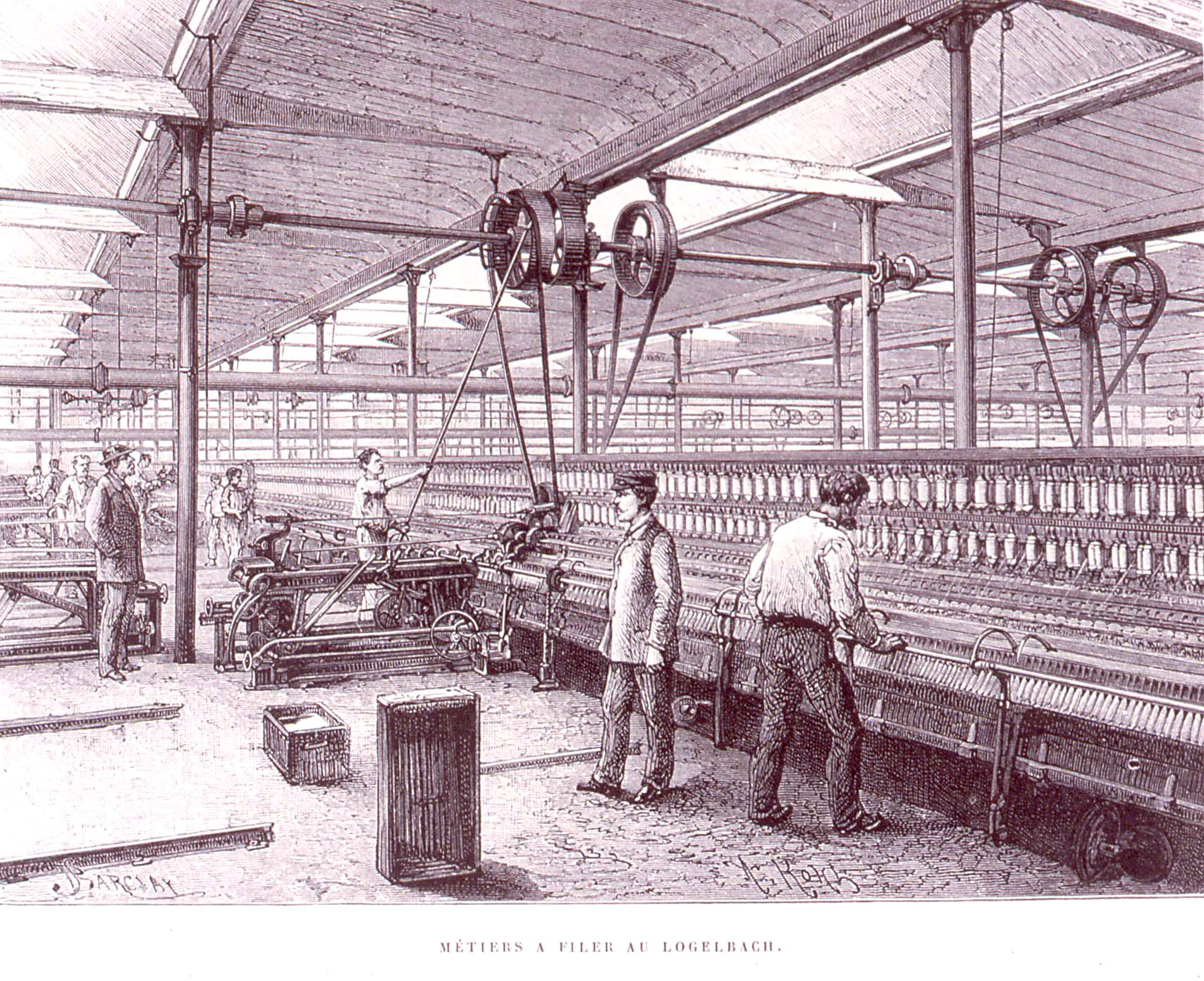
Self-acting spinning machines at Logelbach, France

On March 31 and April 1, 1854, the workers of numerous factories in Barcelona went out on strike demanding the abolition of the so-called self-acting machines, which was causing unemployment.

Then, on June 30, 1854, an armed uprising near Madrid known as the Vicalvarada against the corrupt and unrepresentative government, stimulated a similar revolt in Barcelona in support on July 14 but in which the workers also played a prominent role. They reinitiated their strike, demanding not just the banning of machines but adding demands for political change consistent with the armed uprising.

The next day, several factories that used the new cotton-spinning machines were attacked and burnt. On the 16th at noon the factories in Mataró closed and the workers came out also demanding the removal of the selfactinas, bringing the total to some 60 factories paralysed by strikes, probably the total number that were using automatic machines. The Captain General, de la Rocha, sent forces to protect the factories and made a public announcement that any attacks on property or that jeopardised security would be punished by firing squad. The next day he executed three people accused of setting factories on fire.

Representatives of the spinners met with the Captain General who agreed to issue an edict on July 25 to have selfactinas replaced by older, less efficient machines. However, the employers refused to comply and sought the support of the newly appointed Civil Governor, Pascual Madoz and so the strike continued.

On August 8, a new Captain General, Domingo Dulce y Garay, met with the leaders of the workers who presented a workers' manifesto signed by nineteen associations, demanding pardon for the workers prosecuted and convicted and ending the strike. Within a week, Madoz, reached a compromise between the employers and the spinners on August 15 that although it didn't result in banning machines, increased wages.

Tension remained as the workers waged an almost daily struggle for increased wages and reduced hours. There was an attempt to federate the different associations at a meeting in the Town Hall on October 8 claiming to speak for 80% of workers in the city, probably between 40,000 and 80,000 workers and demanding a minimum salary.

Further negotiations in November finally ratified the agreement with Madoz: spinners received half an hour more time on their midday meal break, which meant reducing weekly hours from 72 to 69.

== Consequences ==
The change in regime in Madrid emboldened the manufacturers and the tension increased during the first months of 1855, especially after the earlier edict was formally annulled in the Madrid parliament. Strikes and “lock-outs” were frequent and following the dubious trial and execution of labour leader Josep Barceló Cassadó, led to the 1855 Catalan general strike which in turn led to an enquiry in the Cortes (parliament) in Madrid in November 1855.

The social and political scope of the Conflict was of considerable importance and demonstrated the desire of the workers to take their demands to the Cortes. As a consequence, the Conflict represents the first attempt in Spain to regulate child labor in factories and to improve the working and social conditions of workers.

== See also ==
- List of strikes in Spain
- Origins of the labor movement in Spain
- History of the cotton industry in Catalonia

== Bibliography ==
- "Conflicte de les selfactines". Gran Enciclopèdia Catalana (in Catalan). Grup enciclopèdia.
- Gow, Richard (2016). "Civil and Military Relations in Spain in the Context of World War I". Small Nations and Colonial Peripheries in World War I. BRILL. p. 133. ISBN 978-90-04-31001-8.
- Gutiérrez Medina, María Luisa (1994). "La España Industrial", 1847-1853. Un modelo de innovación tecnológica ["La España Industrial", 1847-1853. A model of technological innovation] (Thesis) (in Spanish). University of Barcelona. hdl:10803/2003. ISBN 9788469331736.
- Jutglar, Antoni (1984). Historia Crítica de la burguesía en Cataluña [Critical history of the bourgeoisie in Catalonia]. Anthropos. ISBN 9788485887453.
- Maluquer de Motes, Jordi (2019). "La revolució a Catalunya (1832-1935)" [The industrial revolution in Catalonia (1832-1935)]. Butlletí de la Societat Catalana d'Estudis Històrics [Bulletin of the Catalan Historical Studies Society] (in Catalan) (30): 125–179. doi:10.2436/20.1001.01.198.
- Núñez de Arenas, Manuel; Tuñón de Lara, Manuel (1979). Historia del movimiento obrero español [History of the Spanish labour movement] (PDF) (in Spanish). Barcelona: Nova Terra.
- Pons, Marc (15 July 2018). "1855: "Association or death", the story of Catalonia's first general strike". ElNational.cat. Grup les Noticies de Catalunya.
- Sánchez, Alex (2000). "Crisis económica y respuesta empresarial. Los inicios del sistema fabril en la industria algodonera catalana, 1797-1839" [Economic crisis and business response. The beginnings of the factory system in the Catalan cotton industry, 1797-1839]. Revista de Historia Económica (in Spanish). 18 (3): 485–523. doi:10.1017/S0212610900008715. hdl:10016/2159. S2CID 154591957.
- Thomson, J.K.J. (2003). "Transferencia tecnológica en la industria algodonera catalana: de la indianas a la selfactina" [Technology transfer in the Catalan cotton industry: from chintz to self-acting mules]. Revista de Historia Industrial (in Spanish). 24.
