= International Women's Strike =

International strikes by women on 8 March 2017 and 2018

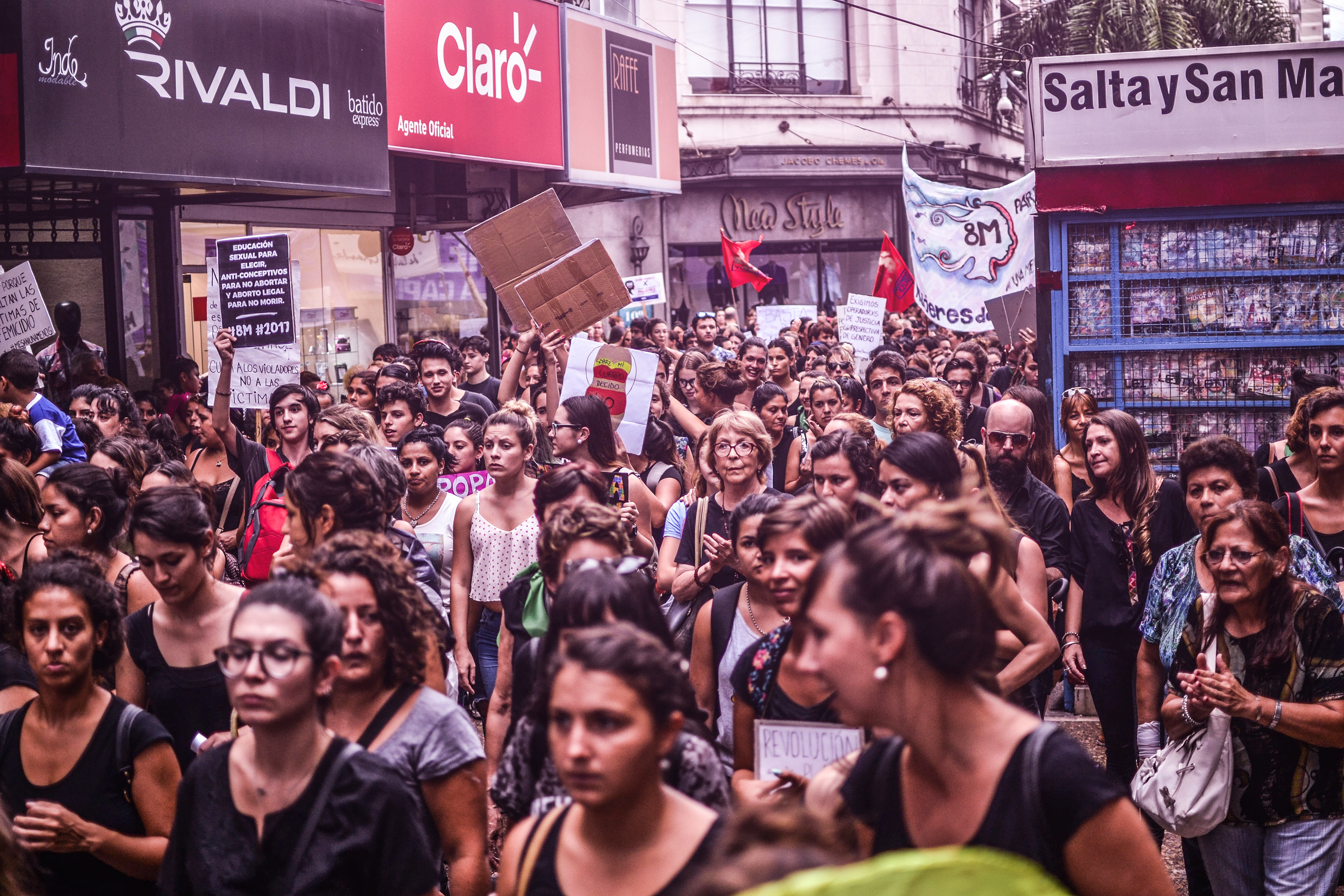
- Demonstrators in Santa Fe, Argentina, where the protest was called Paro Internacional de Mujeres

The International Women's Strike, also known as Paro Internacional de Mujeres, is a global movement coordinated across over 50 countries on International Women's Day, that started in 2017 and 2018. The United Nations announced the theme of "Women in the Changing World of Work: Planet 50-50 by 2030", calling for gender equality around the globe. In the United States, the strike was branded as "Day Without a Woman".

== Background ==
On 3 October 2016, women in Poland organized a nationwide strike following a Polish parliamentary decision to consider a ban on abortion that would criminalize all terminations. The day became known as Black Monday.

19 October 2016, saw the #NiUnaMenos protest against femicide in Argentina, a large-scale response to the murder of 16-year-old Lucía Pérez. Similar demonstrations took place in other Latin American countries including Mexico, El Salvador, Chile, and others. A week later, on 25 October 2017, Brazil held its own #NiUnaMenos strike.

Women's groups in Poland, including the All-Poland Women's Strike, who had organised the Black Protests against proposed legislation that would have tightened Polish abortion law in 2016, together with the Argentinian women's rights activists launched the International Women's Strike in 2017. The Polish and Argentinian groups coordinated using long proprietary software voice over IP discussions together with women from 28 other countries for preparing the strike. This led to strikes in many countries, including techniques such as rallies and banging pots.

== Participating countries ==
Over 50 countries have participated in the International Women's Strike.

=== Ireland ===
In Ireland, an abortion rights platform titled "Strike 4 Repeal" demanded: "[...] that the Irish government call a referendum to repeal the 8th amendment by the 8th of March. If not, we will strike".

The protest was inspired by the Black Protest in Poland several months earlier, and was organised by an ad-hoc, non-affiliated group of activists, academics, artists and trade unionists organising for abortion rights in Ireland. The main march was held in Dublin, with 10,000 people marching to government buildings. Despite the name "strike" some people took paid holidays that day. Protests were also held elsewhere around Ireland and outside the Irish Embassy in London.

The campaign was criticised by some anti-abortion writers. Some participants in the campaign thought the coverage on RTÉ, Ireland's national broadcaster, was insufficient, and organised a follow-up picket of RTÉ studios.

In May 2018, the Thirty-sixth Amendment of the Constitution of Ireland (a proposal described as a 'Repeal of the Eighth Amendment') was approved in a referendum and signed into law in September 2018.

=== Pakistan ===
On 8 March 2018, the first Aurat March (Women's march) was held in Pakistan on International Women's Day. It was organised in Karachi by the feminist collective Hum Aurtein, with corresponding marches held in other cities across the country.

=== Spain ===
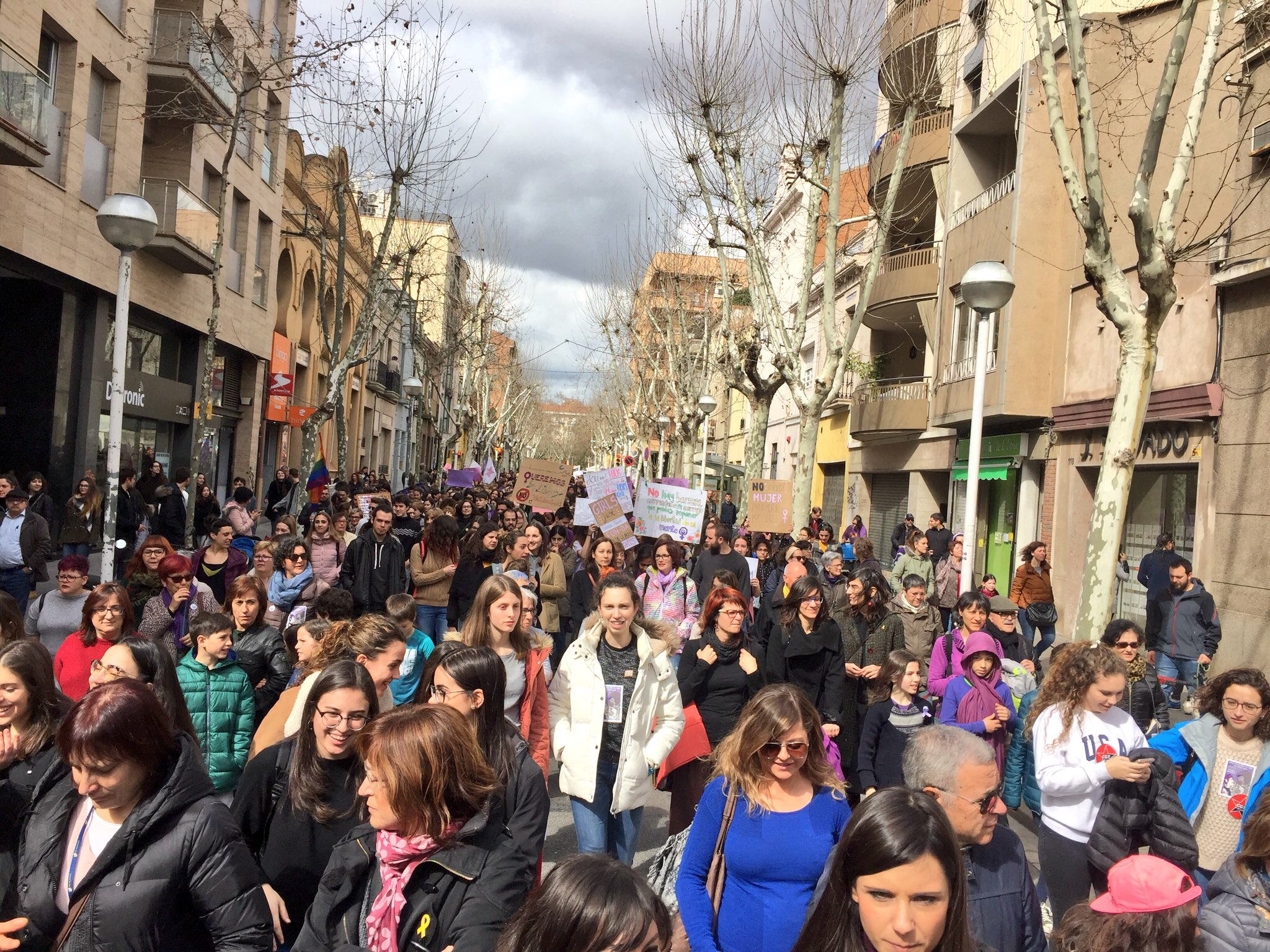
International Women's Strike 2018 in Sabadell (Spain)

On 8 March 2018, the Spanish feminist movement called for a 24-hour strike. The slogan of the day was "If we stop, the world stops". Instead of the strike being a simple labor strike, women were encourage to strike in other aspects of their lives. Women "were summoned to stop working, to stop attending classes, to cease to undertake care work and to avoid consuming". Almost 6 million workers participated in the strike and joined marches in cities across the country. After the International Women's Strike was organized in 2017 and carried out, the next day, several feminist organizations started working together to ensure a 24-hour strike on 8 March 2018 would have a bigger impact. A commission representing these organizations began meeting on the 8th of every month to organize a general strike, and became the national "8 March commission". Local 8 March committees were also created in towns and cities elsewhere in the country. In 2018, the national commission called for controls to tackle "gender violence, bodies and the right to choose, borders and the economy". Hundreds of organizations as well as local political groups supported the strike. Due to the success of the strike call, the issues that were raised gained attention importance in the media and press.

=== United States ===
In the United States, A Day Without a Woman was a general strike held on 8 March 2017 and organized by two different groups—the 2017 Women's March and a separate International Women's Strike movement. The two groups asked that women not work that day to protest the policies of the administration of Donald Trump, encouraging women to refrain from working, spending money (or, alternatively, electing to shop only at "small, women- and minority-owned businesses"), and to wear red as a sign of solidarity.

=== Britain ===
In 2018 there was the first of the annual Women's Strike protests and events. It was organised by Women’s Strike Assembly along with the new United Sex Workers section of the United Voices of the World and included the Sex/Work Strike as part of which a minute's noise for Laura Lee (sex worker) was held in Soho in London and protests outside the family court in London and parliament
