= 2017 Catalan general strike =

General strike taken place in Catalonia on 3 October 2017

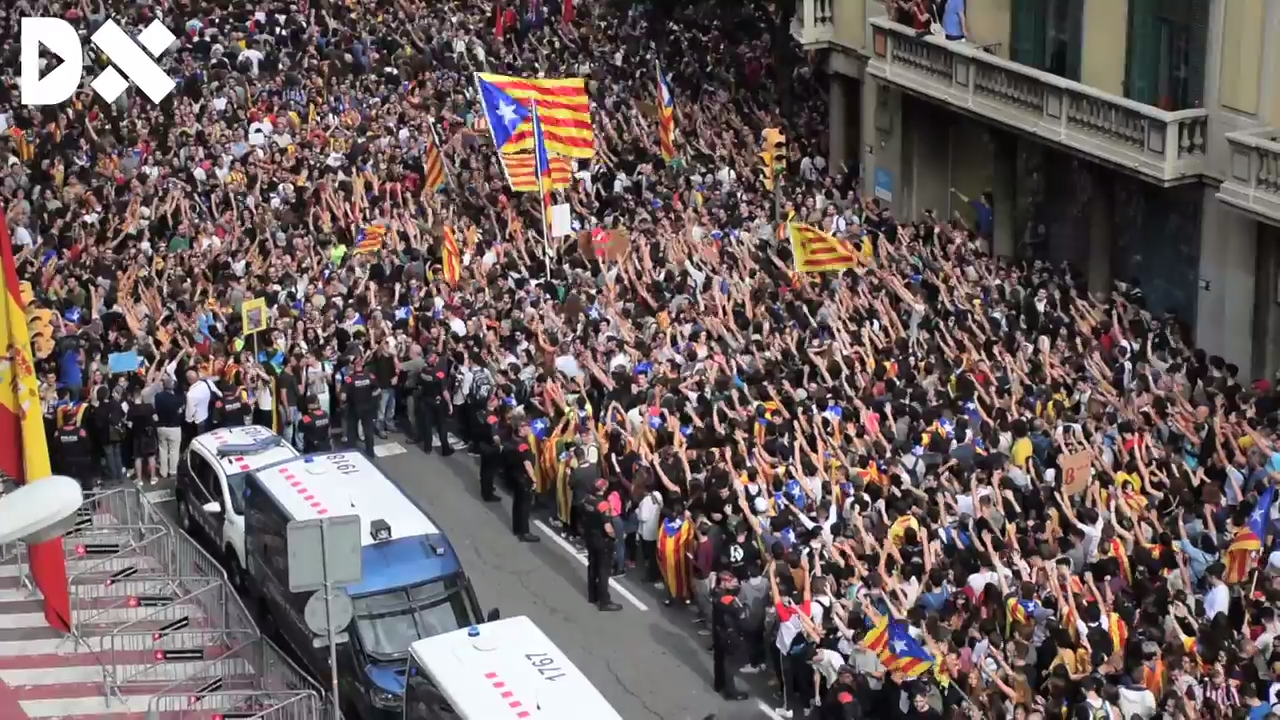
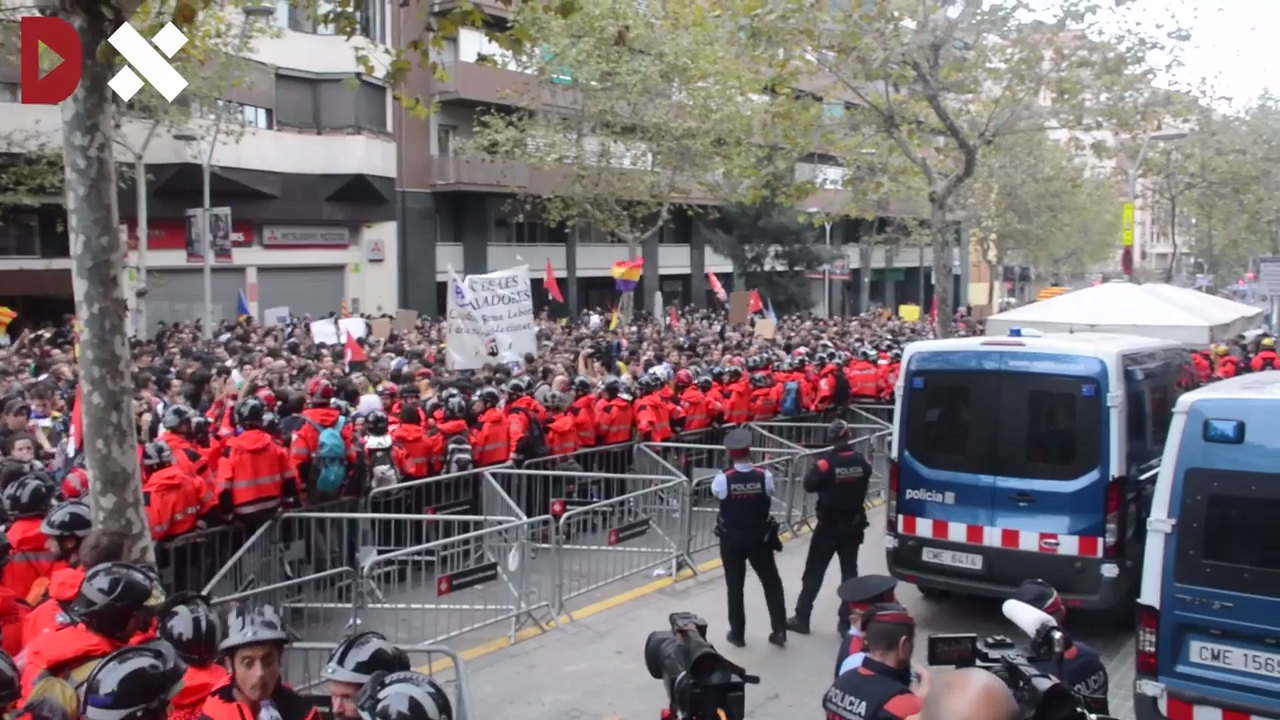
Demonstrations before police and political headquarters in Barcelona

Catalan separatists held a general strike on 3 October 2017 following Catalonia's referendum on independence two days earlier. The referendum, which was held in defiance of Spanish national court orders, resulted in over 900 people injured as the national police attempted to prevent Catalans from voting. The violence galvanized separatist support for the strike, whose planning predated the crackdown, and led to endorsements from the Catalan government, the Catalan branches of the country's two largest labor unions, and pro-independence cultural groups.

Hundreds of thousands of demonstrators, including 700,000 in Barcelona, participated in the strike. Despite high tensions, protests were civil, festive, and without incident, similar to prior pro-independence rallies. While protesters targeted Spanish police and national government sites, other effects included suspended public transportation and port activities, canceled university classes, and closed businesses small and large. Immediate effects of the strike included an emergency meeting called by the Spanish Ministry of the Interior and a rare televised address by Spanish King Felipe VI that condemned Catalan disloyalty and notably did not mention police violence during the referendum. Catalan leader Carles Puigdemont announced that the regional government would declare unilateral independence, which it did later that month.

== Background ==
Catalonia held a contentious referendum on its independence from Spain on Sunday, 1 October 2017, against orders from the Spanish central government. The national police enforcement attempted to prevent Catalans from voting in some locations with violent crackdowns that resulted in about 900 people injured and separatist calls for a general strike. By the time of the strike, the Catalan government was awaiting final referendum results before acting on what they had preliminarily announced as 90 percent support from about 2.3 million voters. The legitimacy of a declarative result was disputable for reasons of general population turnout, voter rolls, and independent confirmation. Sky News described the events as Spain's largest political crisis since its 1930s civil war.

Police violence during the referendum galvanized Catalan unions and cultural associations in support of the general strike. Trade unions, including the General Confederation of Labour (CGT), Intersindical Alternativa de Catalunya (IAC) and Coordinadora Obrera Sindical (COS), planned the strike in advance of the referendum. Their efforts were compounded by strike endorsements given the night of the referendum from pro-independence cultural organizations Òmnium Cultural and the Catalan National Assembly as the vote was tallied. Supporters ultimately included the Catalan government and the Catalan branches of Spain's largest unions: the Unión General de Trabajadores (UGT) and Workers' Commissions (CCOO). (Their national leadership, however, advised Catalans against participating, adding that protests should be nationally coordinated. For legal reasons, the labor unions additionally referred to the strike as a labor dispute, despite its political purpose.) Together, the dozens of pro-independence groups were known as the Taula per la Democràcia, or Board for Democracy. They called for three million Catalans, including business owners, workers, and the self-employed, to withhold their work and bring Catalonia to a halt. At the time of the strike, Catalonia represented a fifth of the Spanish gross domestic product, comparable in size to the Chilean economy. Separatists hoped that the strike would become a major demonstration, leading shop owners to shut down as protesters moved downtown.

== Actions ==
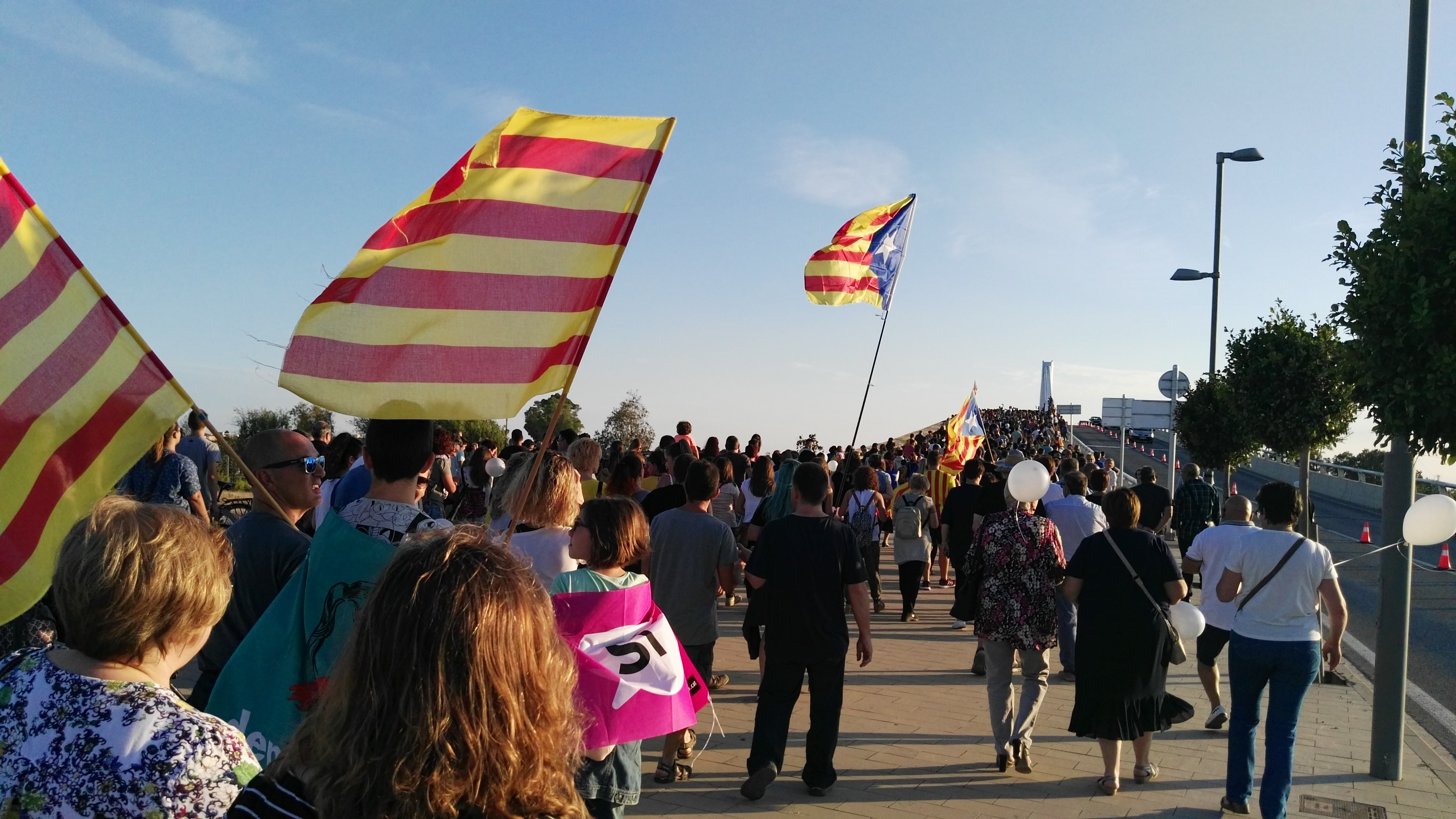
Demonstrators for peace cross the Lo Passador bridge from Deltebre to Sant Jaume d'Enveja in southern Catalonia

On 3 October, two days after the referendum, hundreds of thousands of demonstrators blocked roads across Catalonia, including main thoroughfares in Barcelona. Farmers blocked highways with their tractors. By 9:30 a.m., the Barcelona bus and subway systems were almost entirely halted. Catalonia's railway company suspended service, the national railway ran minimally, and the ports of Barcelona and Tarragona closed, as did places of work from small stores to the large, wholesale food-trading market Mercabarna. Universities canceled classes and the large public market La Boqueria was nearly empty. The strike included the staff of the Barcelona Museum of Contemporary Art and Sagrada Família basilica, and Barcelona's football team, FC Barcelona. Barcelona's airport and most other large industries, however, ran without disruption. Many students and farmworkers participated. By midday, in Barcelona, tens of thousands of people occupied the city's major streets—Avinguda Diagonal, Gran Via, Via Laietana—en route to the major demonstrations at the city's administrative center, Plaça Sant Jaume, and the intersection of Barcelona's other city squares at Ronda de la Universitat. Demonstrators gathered before the region's town halls before a planned action at 6 p.m. Barcelona city police later estimated the city's crowd to be 700,000 people in size.

The Spanish police were a focal point of protest as a response to their actions during the referendum. A manifesto from the Board for Democracy, read from atop a car, called for withdrawal of Spanish security forces and more dialogue in lieu of force. It charged the state with aggressive violation of the public's "fundamental rights and democratic liberties". Protesters chanted, "Spanish police get out!" Demonstrators surrounded the hotels housing Spanish police to demand they leave Catalonia, which was also demanded by Catalan separatist leader Carles Puigdemont. In the small towns of Calella and Pineda de Mar, protests led some hotels to eject their Spanish police guests. Xavier García Albiol, the leading Catalan figure of the Spanish prime minister's party, was booed when voicing his support of the Spanish police in Pineda de Mar. Protests at the National Police Corps station in Barcelona continued from the day prior for its role in repressing the referendum. Demonstrators also protested the Spanish Delegation to Catalonia and showed broad contempt for the Spanish press, whom they accused of manipulative reporting and casting separatists as greedy and violent.

Despite high tensions, protests were civil, festive, and without incident, similar to prior pro-independence rallies. In one case, a protester who threw a beer can into riot police was surrounded by fellow protesters who chanted "We are a people of peace" and encouraged him to leave. Firefighters and the Catalan police acted in an improvised role as peacekeepers at some protests. In one instance, the Catalan police defused a volatile standoff by convincing the Spanish police to leave. Posts on social media encouraged peaceful protest and resistance to incitement. The Catalan government forewarned against plainclothes officers who may infiltrate gatherings to sow discord. Some shops were forced to close by protesters who graffitied "strikebreakers" on their storefronts.

The Estelada flag of Catalan independence

Protesters also sought to maintain momentum from the referendum. Some wore the Estelada (separatist flag) in yellow, red, and blue. Crowds sang Catalan singer Lluís Llach's "L'Estaca" and the Catalan anthem, "Els Segadors". On the Via Laietana, they chanted "Withdraw the forces of occupation" and "The disgrace of Europe" to the tune of the rock song "Seven Nation Army".

== Effects ==
The strike led the Spanish Ministry of the Interior to call an emergency meeting, and Spanish King Felipe VI to give a rare televised address that blamed Catalan leaders and the referendum for destabilizing the nation and showing "disloyalty towards the powers of the state—a state that represents Catalan interests." He did not mention the police violence during the referendum, the main cause for the strike. Barcelona's mayor condemned the speech for its lack of solutions and appeal for dialogue. Catalans responded with a cassolada protest, in which residents publicly made noise with pots and pans.

The union of the Spanish military police compared circumstances in Catalonia to the violent 1981 peak of the Basque conflict, in a warning to police. The police union asked Spanish politicians to protect or withdraw those stationed in Catalonia. The security forces deployed to Catalonia were put on standby for the upcoming week. On the first night of the strike, their union filed complaints: that the Catalan police had not fulfilled its duties by not enforcing the Spanish court ban of the referendum, and that 200 officers were kicked out of a Calella hotel following a threat from the town's mayor.

Spanish Prime Minister Mariano Rajoy remained unrepentant, but met with opposition parties in Madrid. The spokesman for his party derided the "political" strike, compared the separatist function to Nazi indoctrination, and called for Catalan separatist leader Puigdemont to be banned from public office. Puigdemont, in turn, charged the Spanish government with returning to the authoritarian dictatorship of Franco. The first night of the strike, Puigdemont said that the Catalan government would declare independence within a week. Later that month, Catalonia declared its independence.

Red Pepper said that the action was "perhaps the first large-scale workers' strike against state repression in Europe for over 40 years" with solidarity between workers across professions: dockworkers refusing to accommodate armed police boats, firefighters protecting demonstrators, and farm workers creating blockades with tractors.

The labor union Intersindical-CSC called for a follow-up general strike a week later—from 10 to 16 October—which it later retracted. A month later, multiple Catalan groups called for another general strike against the Spanish government's actions against the Catalan independence process, to take place on 8 November, which closed roads across Catalonia but was much smaller in scale than the general strike.

== See also ==
- 1988 Spanish general strike, a general strike called three decades earlier by the same labor unions
- La Canadiense strike, a 1919 strike in Barcelona that became a general strike and led to legislated work day length limits
- Confederación Nacional del Trabajo, a Barcelona-founded labor union that organized multiple Catalan strikes
- Tragic Week (Spain), a series of violent confrontations between the Spanish army and Barcelonan working class radicals
