= List of strikes in Spain =

This is a list of strikes in Spain. It includes labor strikes, student strikes, etc.

== Strikes in Spain ==
- 2 July 1855: The first general strike in Spain. It was motivated by the introduction of self-acting cotton spinning machines in Barcelona.
- 1902 general strike in Barcelona arising out of the demand of the metal-workers for a nine hour day and the right to unionise
- August 1917: The so-called revolutionary general strike called by both main unions and the Socialist Workers Party (PSOE).
- February 1919 La Canadenca strike which lasted over 44 days evolving into a general strike paralyzing much of the industry of Catalonia and which led to the introduction of the 8 hour day in Spain.
- 5 October 1934.
- July 1936.
- 12 November 1976.
- 5 April 1978.
- 23 February 1981.
- 20 June 1985.
- 14 December 1988: The labour reform of Felipe González government results in 1988 Spanish general strike.
- 28 May 1992: A reform of the unemployment benefits leads to the 28 May 1992 general strike.
- 27 January 1994: CCOO and UGT organized the 27 January 1994 general strike against the labour reform.
- 20 June 2002: The 20 June 2002 general strike by CCOO and UGT against the reform of the unemployment benefits.
- 10 April 2003: A 2-hour strike organized by CCOO and UGT against the 2003 invasion of Iraq. CNT and CGT call for a general strike of 24 hours.
- 29 September 2010: The 29 September 2010 general strike against labour reform, wages cut in public sector and pension freezes. It was organized by CCOO, UGT and CGT.
- 27 January 2011: The 27 January 2011 general strike against the pensions reform, organized by ELA, LAB, CIG, CGT y CNT in Catalunya, Galicia, Euskadi and Navarre. Demonstrations were held in other cities.
- 29 March 2012: The 29 March 2012 general strike (es) was a general strike against the labour reform of Mariano Rajoy government. It was organized by CCOO, UGT, USO, CGT, CNT, Solidaridad Obrera, Co.Bas ELA, LAB, ESK, CIG, CUT, CSI, Intersindical-CSC, SOA, SAT, COS, Intersindical Canaria, FSOC, Confederación Intersindical, STC and Sindicato de Estudiantes.

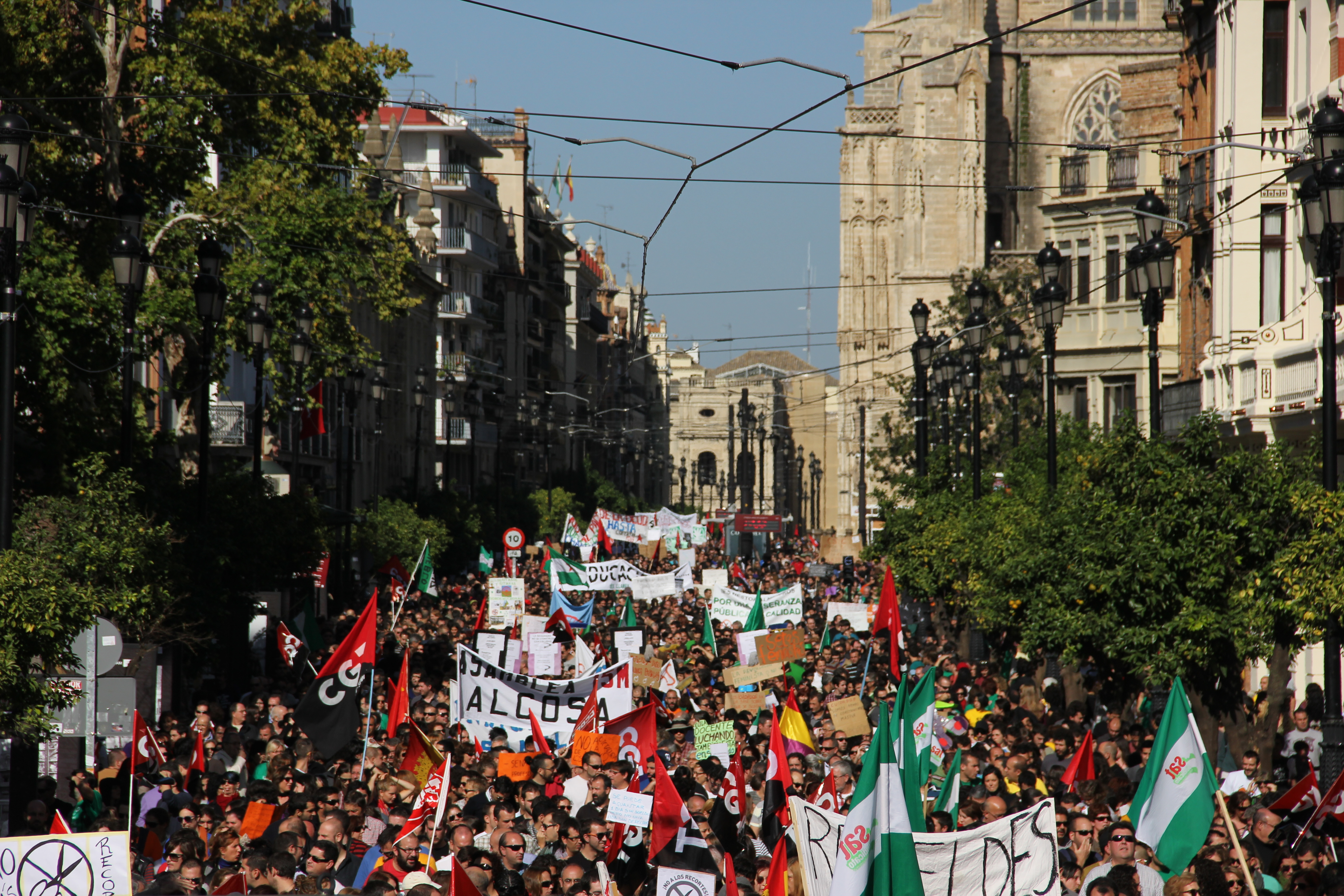
Demonstration in Sevilla, Spain during the 14 November 2012 general strike. Flags of the Confederación General del Trabajo (CGT) and the Andalusian Workers' Union (SAT) are seen.

- 14 November 2012: The 14 November 2012 general strike was a general strike in Spain, Italy, Portugal, Cyprus and Malta. There were solidarity events France, Greece and Belgium.
- 26 March 2014: A student strike starts with demonstrations in 50 cities. They protested against budget cuts in education, the LOMCE law, low quality of education and the dismissal of thousands of teachers. About 50 people were detained by police.
- 26 December 2014: Workers of Renfe and Adif go to strike against privatization of the railway service.
- 17 November 2021: Metalworkers burned street barricades for a second straight day in Spain's southern city of Cádiz, as trade unions demanded wage increases in line with a recent spike in inflation across the European Union. Workers cut some roads leading into Cádiz for a brief period during the morning. They set alight several cars and clashed with police, who responded with rubber bullets. Two police officers suffered minor injuries. Nobody was arrested.
- August 2022 – January 2023 (Ryan cabin-crew strikes): Unions USO and SITCPLA called for a five‑month rolling strike from 8 August 2022 to 7 January 2023, with four‑day stoppages (Monday–Thursday) at multiple Spanish bases including Madrid, Barcelona, Alicante, Málaga, Seville, Valencia, Palma de Mallorca, Girona, and Santiago de Compostela. The action was in response to demands for application of Spanish labour law, reinstatement of dismissed workers, and improved pay and working conditions. Despite reported service disruptions—including 319 cancellations and around 3,700 delays in July—the airline characterized the impact as limited due to minimum‑service rules.
- January–February 2023 (Air-traffic controller strikes): The unions USCA and CCOO organized 24‑hour strikes every Monday—on 30 January, 6, 13, 20, and 27 February—in privatized control towers across 16 airports (e.g., A Coruña, Alicante–Elche, Castellón, Madrid‑Cuatro Vientos, Fuerteventura, Lanzarote, Ibiza, Jerez, La Palma, Lleida, Murcia, Sabadell, Seville, Valencia, and Vigo). The dispute focused on salary increases rejected by employers (who had offered 0–2.5% over 2021–2024).
- November 2023 (27–28 November) – (Amazon Cyber Monday symbolic strike): The CCOO union called on approximately 20,000 Amazon logistics and delivery workers nationwide to conduct one‑hour work stoppages per shift. The protest, scheduled for Cyber Monday, addressed demands for better workplace safety, more human‑resources staffing, and fairer wages.
- May 2023 (Judicial staff indefinite strike): Around 45,000 court officials (93% of court and tribunal staff) participated in an indefinite strike beginning 22 May 2023. The unions CSIF, STAJ, CCOO, and UGT demanded higher pay and improved working conditions. The action suspended approximately half a million cases and froze over 30 million legal proceedings. An agreement with the Justice Ministry, including a salary increase of about €450/month, brought the strike to a close.
- February 2024 (from 9 February onward) – Rail freight and staff strikes: CCOO-led unions initiated a 23‑hour national strike on 9 February, disrupting up to 65% of rail freight operations. UGT launched supplementary two‑hour strikes on Mondays (12, 19, 26 February), and both unions orchestrated stop‑work actions on Rodalies commuter services in Catalonia on 16–17 February. The disputes targeted implementation of a 35‑hour work week and elimination of income categories. Hundreds of long‑distance and commuter trains were cancelled, including high‑speed AVE and Cercanías services.
- November–December 2024: A widespread mass strike of bus, intercity, school bus, and tow-truck drivers began on 28 November 2024, with participation by approximately 80,000–90,000 transport workers. Additional strike dates were announced (29 November, 5 and 9 December), with the threat of indefinite action from 23 December if demands weren't met. Minimum service levels of at least 50% were mandated by the Minister of Transport.
- 27 September 2024: A 24-hour general strike titled "Against the genocide and occupation in Palestine" was observed nationwide. It was organized by over 200 trade unions and NGOs—including Spain's General Confederation of Labor (CGT)—accompanied by demonstrations in Madrid, Barcelona, Bilbao, and student participation. The action aimed to urge the Spanish government to sever diplomatic, commercial, and military relations with Israel.
- March–April 2025 (Rail): Renfe and Adif rail unions called for a seven-day nationwide train strike protesting the proposed transfer of the Rodalies(Catalonia regional rail) system from the central government to the Generalitat. Strike days were scheduled on 17, 19, 24, 26, 28 March, and 1, 3 April 2025. However, the strikes were averted at the last minute: a deal was struck just four hours before the first stoppage to prevent disruption to over 2,100 train services.
- 19 May 2025 (Immigration Offices) A nationwide two-hour strike by staff at immigration offices protested severe under-staffing, rising workloads, and institutional neglect. The strike took place from 12:30 to 14:30, highlighting increased case resolution times and vacancies exceeding 30%, even up to 50% in some provinces.
- 13 June 2025 (Doctors/Healthcare): A one-day nationwide strike by doctors was organized by CESM and SMA to oppose a proposed Framework Law. Demands included reduction of the workweek to 35 hours, recognition of on-call hours in pension contributions, fair compensation for overtime, and better work-life balance. Non-urgent surgical procedures were suspended, while emergency services continues. Demonstrations were held across Spain. Independent coverage noted that this was the first nationwide medical strike in five years, invoking metaphors such as a "regime from 50 years ago" to highlight longstanding working-condition issues.
- June 2025 (Iberdrola): Unions representing workers at Iberdrola, Spain's large utility firm, called on over 9,000 workers to strike—marking the first in the company's century-long history. The action protested low pay increases (2.8% from 2021–2024) against high inflation (19%). The unions demanded wage increases tied to inflation to preserve purchasing power. Minimum service levels prevented power supply disruptions.
- 25–27 June 2025 (EasyJet Cabin Crew): EasyJet cabin crews based in Spain, represented by the USO union, went on a three-day strike to demand wage parity with European counterparts and improved conditions. Approximately 657 flight attendants at bases in Alicante, Barcelona, Malaga, and Palma de Mallorca participated.Despite potential disruptions, EasyJet planned to maintain operations under regulated minimum-service requirements.
- July 2025 (Judges and Prosecutors): A three-day strike by judges and prosecutors began in early July 2025, with a reported participation rate of 75% from the 5,400 judges and 2,800 prosecutors called to walk out.
- July 2025 (Hospitality, Balearic Islands): A major planned strike, including an airport blockade by over 180,000 hospitality sector workers in Mallorca, Ibiza and Menorca across several July dates, was called off following a salary agreement. Demands had ranged from 15% to 19% wage increase over three years; employers raised offers to 11%.
- Mid-August to Dec 2025 (Ryanair/Airport Handling): Azul Handling (Ryanair subsidiary) ground staff initiated prolonged industrial action from 15 August through December 2025. Unions claimed violations of labour rights, coercion, job insecurity, and broken agreements. Partial walkouts were scheduled for Wednesdays, Fridays, Saturdays, and Sundays, in three daily blocks across 27 Spanish airports. Ryanair expects no operational disruption.

== See also ==
- Strike action
- History of the cotton industry in Catalonia
