= International Women's Strike 2018 =

Global feminist strike

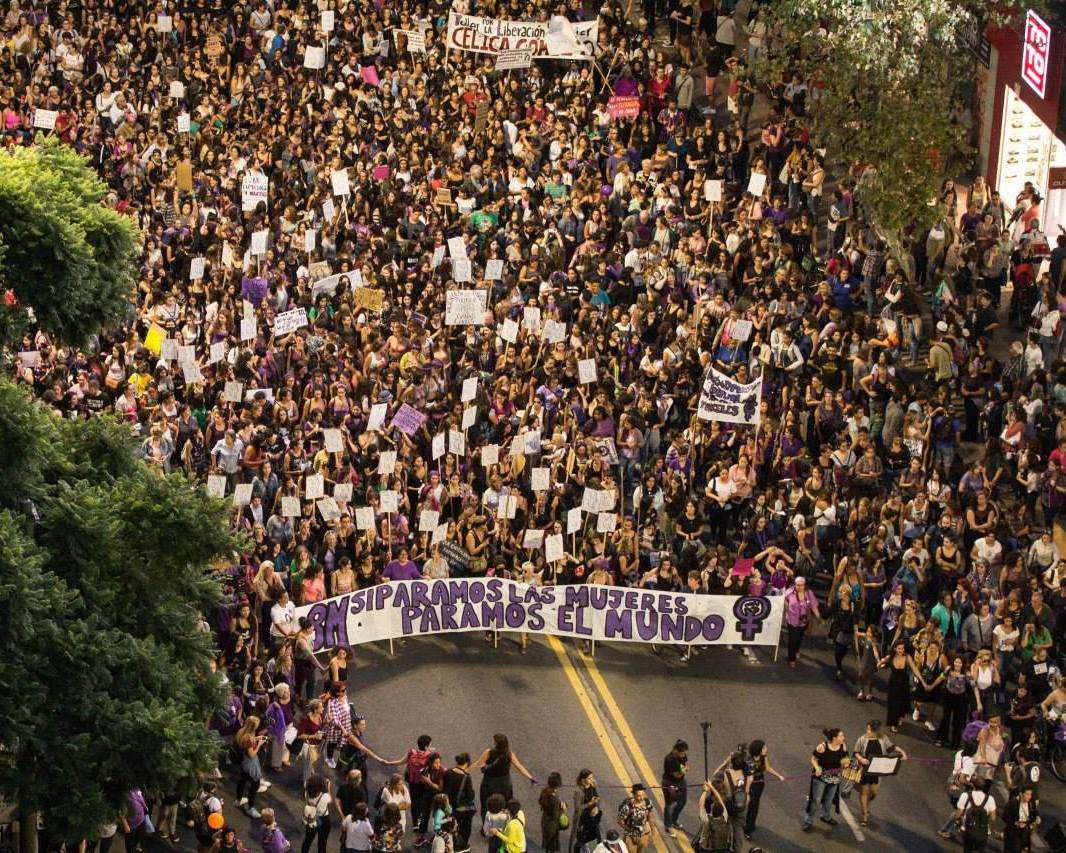
Strike in Montevideo

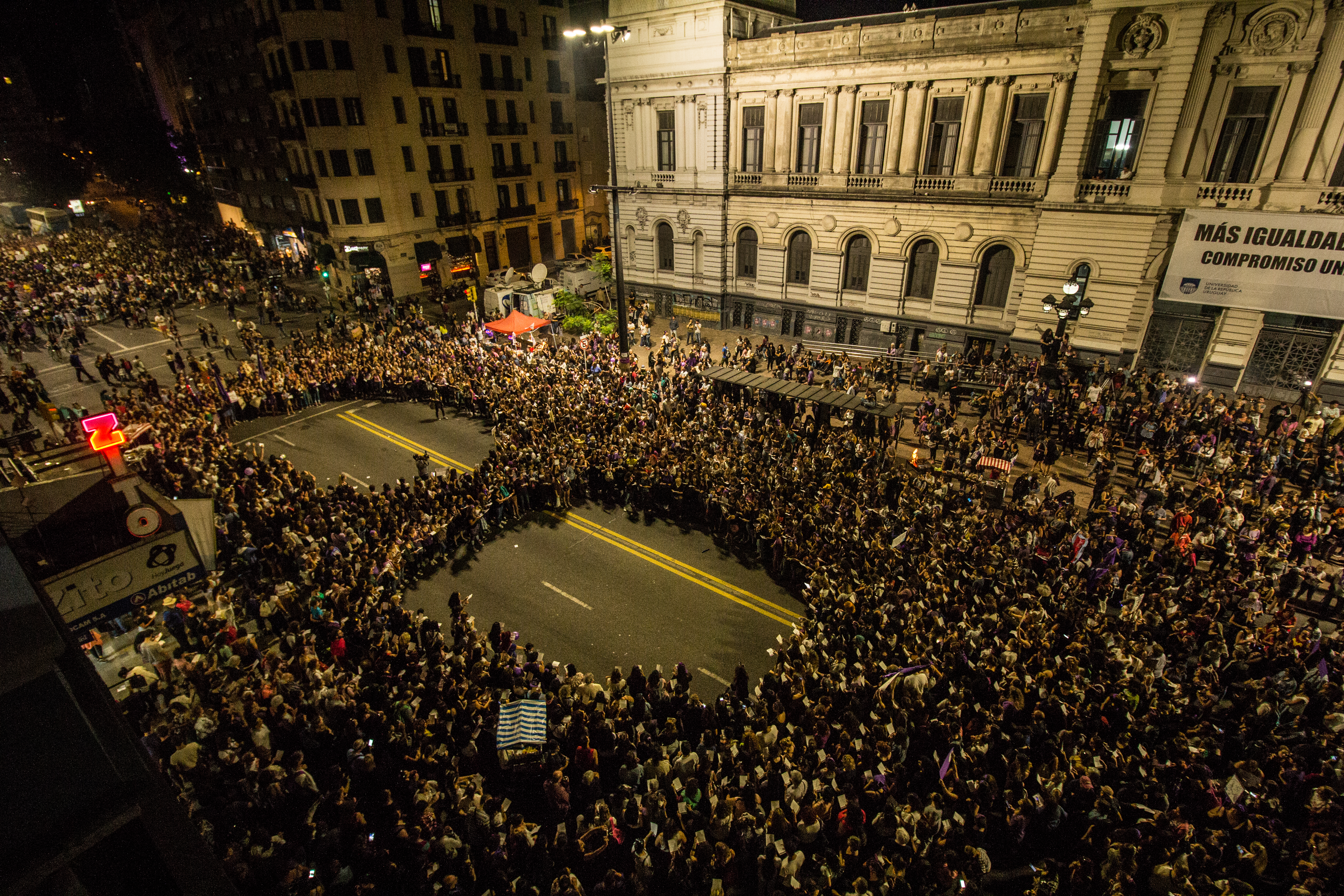
Strike in Montevideo

The International Women's Strike or International Feminist Strike 8-M was a movement that took place on March 8, 2018, International Women's Day. It was organized by feminist movements in support of women's rights across the world. It was supported by over 170 countries and a large number of related local activities.

The movement called for the end of violence against women, gender inequality, and different forms of oppression against women. This international action also had the objective to determine the level of exploitation of women in the workplace, social reproduction, and reproductive labor.

== History ==
See also Global Women's Strike and International Women's Strike.

The first historical example of a national strike led by a women's movement took place in Iceland, on October 24, 1975, with paid workers and housewives taking part. On the anniversary of the strike, October 24, 2016, Icelandic women left their workplaces two hours and twenty minutes before the end of the working day, demonstrating the visible representation of the gender pay gap between men and women.

On March 8, 2000, the Campaña Internacional por un Salario para el Trabajo en el Hogar called the first International Women's Strike, demanding the women's right to justice for their unrecognised contribution to the workforce. The movement was especially active during the years 2000-2001.

Another large protest took place on October 3, 2016 in Poland, known as Black Monday, against plans to criminalize abortion, including miscarriage, and the termination of a pregnancy as a result of rape. The most important result was that law was not passed in the Polish parliament.

On October 19, 2016, in Argentina, members of the movement Ni Una Menos and other feminist organizations, called for an hour-long strike and various demonstrations, after a week with 7 femicides. A Women's March on Washington was also held on January 21, 2017.

In the context of massive demonstrations in different countries, Polish activists began to connect and coordinate actions with similar movements in other countries, initially joined by Israel, Italy, South Korea, Russia, Ireland, Brazil, and Mexico forming a group to create the International Women's Strike.

The first International Women's Strike was on March 8, 2017 and took place in more than 50 countries around the world. Important protests occurred for the International Day for the Elimination of Violence against Women on November 25, 2017 in different countries, as well as a massive answer to the call of the Women's March 2018 in the United States. These movements are considered as precedents for a second global call to an international women's strike by activists.

Later, in October 2017, during the 3rd ITUC World Women's Conference/Women's Organizing Assembly, 200 female trade unionists gathered from around the world in Costa Rica, and trade unionist representatives from Latin America, primarily from Argentina and Brazil, asked the unions to take part in the second International Women's Strike call on March 8, 2017.

== International Women's Strike 2018 ==
=== Call ===
Under slogans like #NosParamos, #WeStrike,"If our lives are worthless, produce without us", "What they call love is unpaid work", the feminist movements called for a strike from workers, students, carers and consumers. The call included salaried and non-salaried women of all sexual orientations and identities.

One of the main demands was for a society free from violence against women, whose most visible manifestation is the aggression and murder of women for the simple fact of being women. Women's labor rights were also defended, affected by precarious work, the gender pay gap, and sexual harassment in the workplace. Poverty, racial violence, persecution of immigrants and cutbacks in social and health programmes were also reported.

=== Organisation ===
The March 8 movements were stopped in more than 70 countries by multiple national and local organisations, collectives, and activists. These movements were globally assembled by coalitions like the Spanish Internacional Feminista and International Women's Strike.

In dozens of cities, preparatory assemblies were held to organise marches and other actions. These assemblies did not respond to a centralized organisation and were convened at a local level, generally in public spaces such as squares, with participants ranging from a few dozen to more than a thousand, such as the meeting that took place in Buenos Aires on February 8, 2018.

Trade unions supported the strike in some countries, although the form of this support took was a matter of debate. While some sections of the trade union movement argued that a strike could not legally distinguish between the sexes, the feminist movement argued that only women should go on strike. From this perspective, men should support the women by taking on the work and care tasks that were left unattended, and participating in other types of actions that would contribute to making the importance of women visible. In Spain, CNT (National Confederation of Labour), CGT (General Confederation of Labour), CIG (Galician Unions Confederacy), CoBas (Union of broad-based commissions of Catalonia) and other non-majority unions called a 24-hour general strike, providing legal coverage to be able to strike in all work centers throughout the day. On the other hand, UGT (General Union of Workers) and CCOO (Worker's Commissions) called for 2-hour partial stoppages in the morning and the afternoon; and USE called for a four-hour stoppage at noon. Part of the management accused them of supporting a political strike, but they were not brought to justice.

==== Movement 'WE FEMALE JOURNALISTS STOP' ====
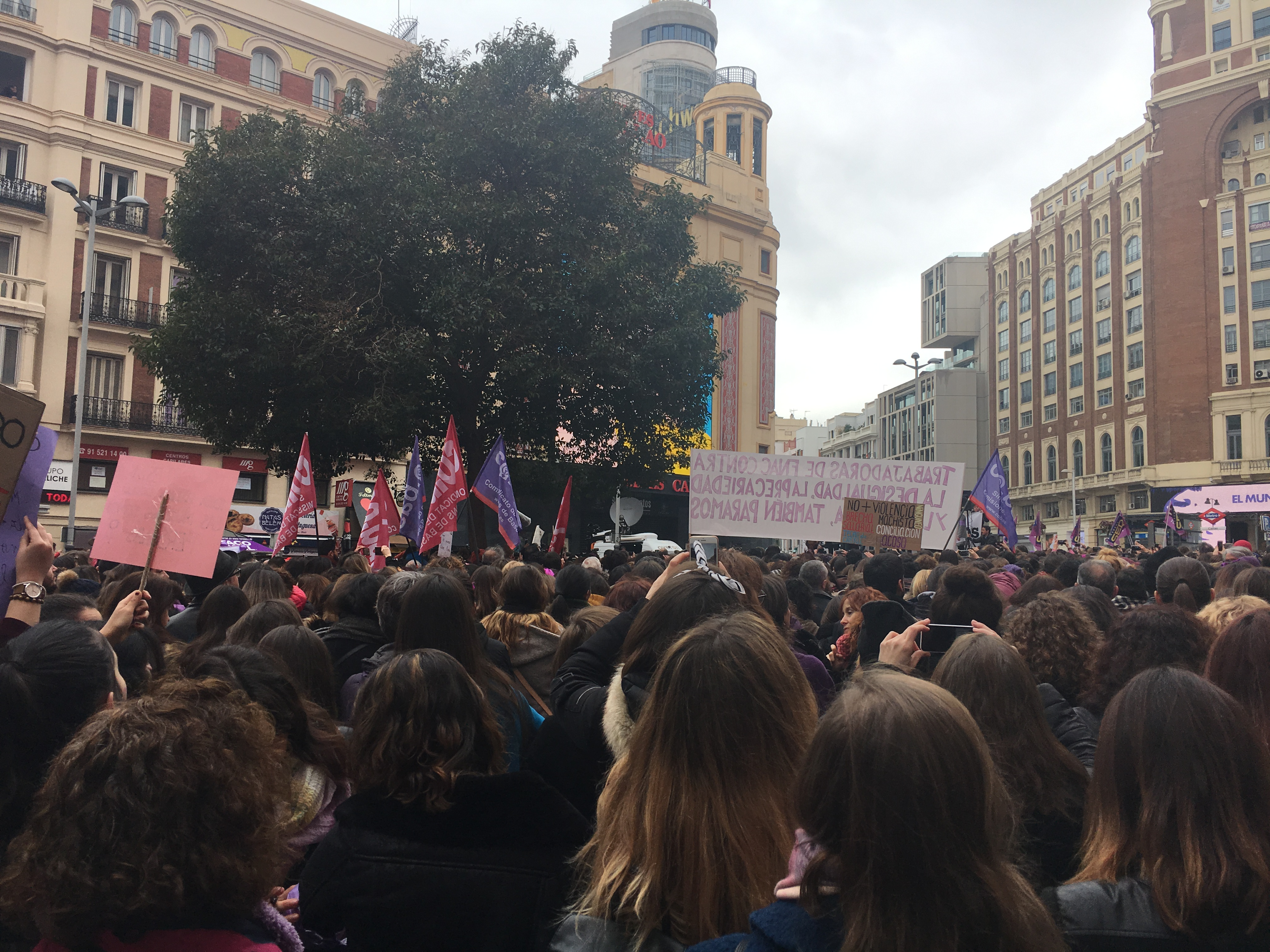
Journalists Stop in Madrid

In Spain at the beginning of March, a movement of women journalists with the slogan 'Las periodistas paramos' ('We female journalists strike') began spontaneously, which within a few days won the support of more than 8,000 female media professionals. The movement specifically denounces the Gender pay gap suffered by women in the sector, the glass ceiling, the precariousness and higher levels of temporary employment suffered by female journalists compared to their colleagues, sexual and labour harassment and calls for co-responsibility in care. It also encourages groups of women journalists from other countries to make their own manifesto.

On March 8, the manifesto was read at the Plaza Callao in Madrid at the gates of the Press Palace. The meeting was attended by several hundred female journalists from the main Spanish media. It was also held in other Spanish cities: Barcelona, Bilbao, Granada, Cadiz, Valencia, Seville and León.

The document explains that they are aware of the 'social relevance' of the work they do and they are concerned about 'the partial vision of reality that the media so often offer and in which the presence and contributions of women are lacking'. 'Feminism is also necessary to improve journalism,' they highlight.

For this reason, the professionals who have promoted the manifesto call on the media and newspaper companies to take action in areas such as the wage gap, demanding 'wage transparency and a review of professional categories, complements and criteria'.

== 8M Demands ==
Civil and political equality, equality before the law, equal pay, right to work, right to education, equal opportunities and equality of outcome for women compared to men makes up the general core of the world's demands, which have their own expression in each country depending on its socio-political situation. Thus, as part of human rights, reproductive rights (access to family planning and birth control methods and abortion-rights), sexual freedom (sexual diversity, LGBT), etc. are claimed. An end to violence against women (aggression, humiliation, discrimination or exclusion, rape, murder of women) and the adoption of legal, political and educational measures to protect women is called for. The wage gap between men and women was condemned, calling for equal pay for equal work. Reproductive labor (domestic work and care work), which is fundamental to sustaining the lives of human beings and is carried out mainly by women and is not recognized. A secular state and equal education were claimed.
