= Sex/Work Strike =

Advocacy effort for decriminalisation of sex work

The Sex/Work Strike began in 2018 as part of the International Women's Strike on International Women's Day with the aim of the full decriminalisation of sex work. Participants included the writer Molly Smith, author of Revolting Prostitutes. In 2019 it was supported by many groups including the English Collective of Prostitutes, x:talk, United Voices of the World (USW), East London Strippers Collective, Sisters Uncut Edinburgh, London, Class War and Young Greens.

== See also ==
- 2021 Minas Gerais prostitute strike
- International Union of Sex Workers
- Occupation of Saint-Nizier church by Lyon prostitutes
- Sex workers' rights
