= General Confederation of Labour (Spain) =

Spanish trade union

- Confederación General del Trabajo
- Flag of the CGT
- Abbreviation: CGT
- Established: 16 December 1979; 46 years ago (as the CNT–CV); 29 April 1989; 37 years ago (as the CGT)
- Type: National trade union center
- Headquarters: Calle Sagunto, 15 (Madrid)
- Location: Spain
- Members: 102,874 (2023)
- Secretary General: Miguel Fadrique Sanz
- Affiliations: Red and Black Coordination
- Website: cgt.es
- Formerly called: CNT–Valencia Congress (1979–1983); CNT–Renewed (1983–1989)

The General Confederation of Labour (Spanish: Confederación General del Trabajo; CGT) is a Spanish trade union federation. Formed as a faction of the National Confederation of Labour (CNT) during the Spanish transition to democracy, its support for participation in union elections led it to split from the organisation, which prohibited participation. After losing a lengthy legal battle for the name, the pro-electoral faction renamed itself to the CGT and reorganised itself as an independent trade union center.

By the 21st century, the CGT had become one of the largest trade unions in Spain, gaining more than 100,000 members and electing more than 7,000 representatives to works councils. It has gained a particularly strong influence in the automotive, telecommunication and transportation industries, which it has called to be brought under social ownership. Its support for self-determination put it in the leading role of organising the 2017 Catalan general strike and its support for feminism drove its participation in women's strikes on each International Women's Day.

== History ==
=== Establishment ===
During the Spanish transition to democracy, the National Confederation of Labour (Spanish: Confederación Nacional del Trabajo; CNT), a revolutionary anarcho-syndicalist trade union, was restructured and returned to workplace organising in Spain. By the end of the 1970s, deep generational, ideological and tactical divides had caused the CNT to fragment. At the CNT's 5th Congress, held in Madrid in December 1979, the debate over participation in union elections provoked a split. When the congress resolved to prohibit electoral participation, supporters of participation accused the organisers of blocking them from speaking on the matter and 53 unions abandoned the meeting.

The unions that supported electoral participation represented 8,000 members, roughly one-third of the CNT's remaining membership. Together they established a Technical Commission (Spanish: Comisión Técnica Impugnadora; CTI), which launched a legal challenge to the outcome of the Madrid Congress. From 25 to 27 July 1980, the CTI held an extraordinary congress in Valencia, where delegates resolved to authorise participation in union elections. The orthodox faction of the CNT responded by expelling the dissident unions, which it denounced as "enemies of trade unionism".

Members of the CTI were physically attacked and sent death threats, prompting the dissident CNT faction to establish self-defense units. To distinguish itself from the "official" CNT, the CTI renamed itself to the CNT-Valencia Congress (Spanish: CNT-Congreso de Valencia; CNT-CV). By February 1981, the conflict had escalated into open violence, forcing the "official" CNT prohibited further violence, except in cases of self-defense. In 1983, the "official" CNT itself succombed to internal disputes over participation in union elections; the "renovators" (advocates of participation) were prevented from voting at its extraordinary congress, provoking general secretary José Bondía to resign from the organisation. The renovators were subsequently invited to join the CNT-CV, which took place at a Unification Congress at Madrid's Palacio de Congresos in 1984.

The legal battle between the two factions continued throughout the 1980s, finally ending in 1989, when the Supreme Court of Spain banned the dissident faction from using the name of the CNT. The pro-election faction of the CNT then reorganised itself into the General Confederation of Labour (Spanish: Confederación General del Trabajo; CGT). Its first act as the CGT was to join that year's International Workers' Day celebrations, organised by other trade unions.

Workers' Solidarity (Spanish: Solidaridad Obrera; SO) later split from the Madrid section of the CGT, opting to allow its members the choice of whether or not to participate in union elections. Throughout the 2000s, the CGT has established a series of syndicalist internationals, together with the Central Organisation of Swedish Workers (SAC). These included: the International Libertarian Solidarity (2001–2003); the European Federation of Alternative Syndicalism (2003–2009); and finally the Red and Black Coordination (2010–present). The International Workers' Association (IWA), a rival anarcho-syndicalist international, has criticised the CGT's participation in works councils as "reformism", although the CGT insists it has merely adapted to new material conditions and considers itself to practice a pragmatic form of syndicalism.

=== Growth ===
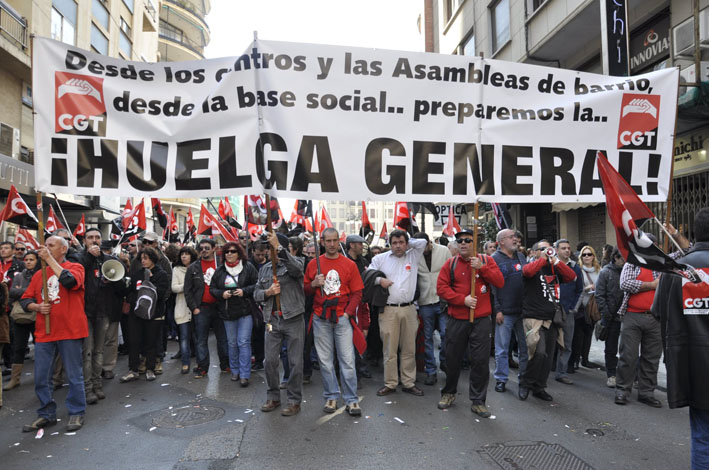
Demonstration by the CGT during the 2012 general strike

The CGT counted 50,000 members during the 1990s; since then its membership has doubled. Following the Great Recession, the major Spanish trade unions called general strikes in 2010 and 2012, although they maintained an ambivalent position towards political and economic reform. In reaction to the moderate position of the mainstream unions, many within the rising anti-austerity movement moved towards anarcho-syndicalism, which led to a growth in the CGT's membership. In 2012, the CGT counted 4,805 representatives in works councils (1.6% of all union representatives). In the 2015 union elections, its vote-share increased, leading to the election of 5,435 CGT representatives (2% of all union representatives).

By 2020, it counted 100,000 members, which together accounted for 3.5% of all Spanish trade union members. This made the CGT the fourth-largest trade union in Spain, behind the General Union of Workers (UGT), Workers' Commissions (CCOO) and Unión Sindical Obrera (USO). It is also the largest anarcho-syndicalist union in the country. The CGT has also increased its elected union delegates to more than 7,000 representatives; together representing millions of workers in various different industries.

The CGT's unions are most powerful within the automotive, telecommunication and transportation industries; it also has a significant presence in the banking, cleaning, education, healthcare and public administration sectors.

In April 2023, after three decades of internecine conflict, the CGT, CNT and SO came together to form a "united action pact", with the intention of defending public welfare, fighting for equality and opposing repression against the labour movement.

== Campaigns ==
=== Catalan self-determination ===
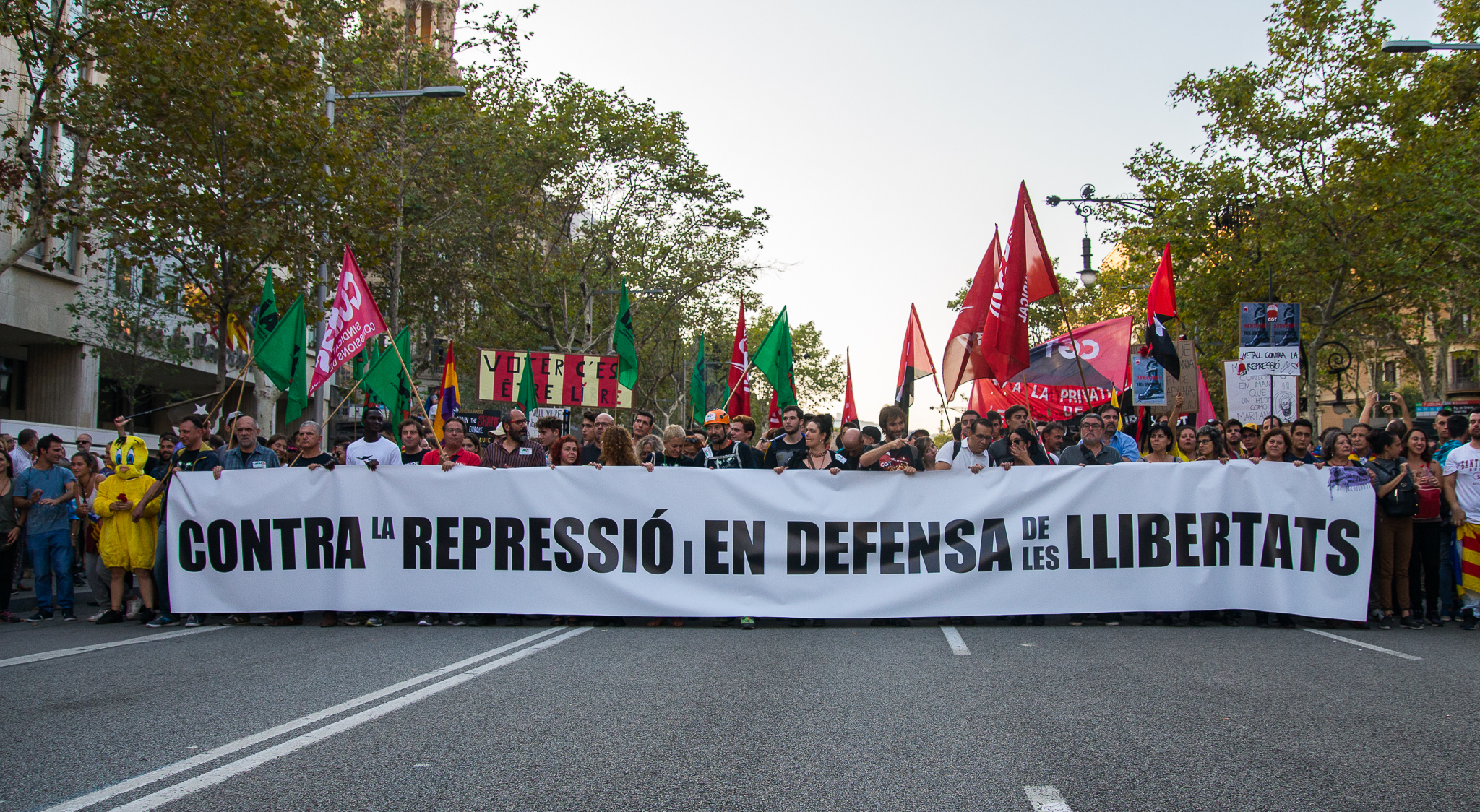
Demonstration by the CGT (right) and IAC (left) during the 2017 Catalan general strike

In 1985, the CGT passed a motion that supported self-determination for the nationalities and regions of Spain. On every National Day of Catalonia (11 September) since 2004, the Catalan branch of the CGT has publicly reaffirmed their support for self-determination. In 2013, they issued a manifesto Dret a decidir, which linked Catalan self-determination with the anarchist policy of workers' self-management and called for the abolition of capitalism in Catalonia. The Catalan CGT is closely linked with the Popular Unity Candidacy (CUP), a left-wing nationalist party, and the two share members throughout the region. By 2017, the CGT counted 19,300 members in the region Catalonia, which made it the third-largest union in the region.

Ahead of the 2017 Catalan independence referendum, the CGT criticised the political repression of the Catalan self-determination process, which it called an "attack on the rights and liberties of everybody". Emphasising their support for self-management and direct democracy, the CGT called on workers to mobilise in the streets and carry out civil disobedience "in defence of the liberties that the capitalist system denies us". After the referendum, the CGT denounced the state prosecution of hundreds of officials, civil servants and school teachers who had supported the independence process.

In response to the political repression that followed the referendum, on 3 October 2017, the CGT called a general strike in Catalonia and invited all trade unions to join it. The CGT was quickly joined by the Intersindical Alternativa de Catalunya (IAC) and Coordinadora Obrera Sindical (COS), and soon after by the CNT, SO and Confederació Sindical Catalana (CSC). Despite the UGT and CCOO's refusal to participate, the strike received up to 80% support from Catalan workers; according to José Antonio Gutiérrez and Jordi Martí Font, this made it "the most successful strike in recent history in Spain". The CGT, CNT and SO, together with other Catalan anarchist groups, signed a manifesto expressing support for self-determination, denouncing political repression, and calling for the establishment of workers' self-management and direct democracy in Catalonia. They were supported by the Madrid sections of the CGT, CNT and SO, which held a solidarity demonstration in support of self-determination.

=== Feminist general strikes ===
In the mid-2010s, issues such as violence against women, the gender pay gap and unpaid domestic labour provoked a number of Spanish feminist organisations to call a general strike for International Women's Day. On 8 March 2017, the Andalusian branch of the CGT joined the strike, but overall, trade union participation in the strike was lacking. The following year, the call for a feminist general strike was backed by the CGT, as well as the CNT and CO.BAS, which declared that its workers would cease work for 24 hours. The women's strikes of 2018 and 2019 successfully mobilised hundreds of thousands of people, but further actions were limited by the outbreak of the COVID-19 pandemic in Spain. Although subsequent strikes lost the support of the larger unions, the CGT and other smaller unions supported the 2020 women's strike; according to the CGT, 50% of Barcelona Metro workers went on strike on 8 March 2020.

=== Railway socialisation ===
One of the CGT's strongest sections is its railway union. In the 2015 union elections, the CGT secured representation in the works councils of both Renfe and ADIF. Since 2001, the CGT has advocated for the railways to be brought under social ownership and to be maintained as a public service, with guarantees of consumer protection and workplace safety standards. Unlike the UGT and CCOO, which call for state ownership of the railways, the CGT has criticised the continued oscillation between state and private ownership of the railways throughout history as a force for capital accumulation. The CGT therefore advocates for a railway model where public service is valued above profitability; it has criticised the AVE as a profit seeking enterprise, built and maintained for an elite few.

== Bibliography ==
- Buier, Natalia (2020). "High-Speed Contradictions: Spanish Railways between Economic Criticism and Political Defense". In Birch, Kean; Muniesa, Fabian (eds.). Assetization: Turning Things into Assets in Technoscientific Capitalism. pp. 127–148. doi:10.7551/mitpress/12075.001.0001. ISBN 9780262359030.
- Correa, Felipe (2023). "The Global Revival of Anarchism and Syndicalism". In van der Linden, Marcel (ed.). The Cambridge History of Socialism. Vol. 1. Cambridge University Press. pp. 621–647. doi:10.1017/9781108611022.027. ISBN 978-1-108-48134-2.
- Gallas, Alexander (2024). "Changing Terrains: The General and Feminist General Strikes in Spain". Exiting the Factory. Vol. 2. Bristol University Press. pp. 152–197. doi:10.51952/9781529242249.ch008. ISBN 978-1-5292-4223-2.
- Guinchard, François (2014). "The Birth of an International Anarcho-syndicalist Current". Workers of the World. 1 (4). ISSN 2182-8938.
- Gutiérrez, José Antonio; Martí Font, Jordi (2023). "October 2017 in Catalonia: The anarchists and the procés". Nations and Nationalism. 29 (1): 209–228. doi:10.1111/nana.12896. ISSN 1354-5078.
- Las Heras, Jon; Roca, Beltrán (2023). "New practices in industrial relations: radical unionism in the European periphery". In Fernández Rodríguez, Carlos; Martínez Lucio, Miguel (eds.). Work and Employment Relations in Southern Europe. Edward Elgar Publishing. pp. 137–162. doi:10.4337/9781789909548.00012. ISBN 9781789909531.
- Hirsch, Steven J.; van der Walt, Lucien (2010b). "Final Reflections: the vicissitudes of anarchist and syndicalist trajectories, 1940 to the present". In Hirsch, Steven J.; van der Walt, Lucien (eds.). Anarchism and Syndicalism in the Colonial and Postcolonial World, 1870–1940. Studies in Global Social History. Vol. 6. Leiden: Brill. pp. 395–412. ISBN 9789004188495. OCLC 868808983.
- Romanos, Eduardo (2011). "Factionalism in Transition: A Comparison of Ruptures in the Spanish Anarchist Movement". Historical Sociology. 24 (3): 355–380. doi:10.1111/j.1467-6443.2011.01401.x.
- Romanos, Eduardo; Ledesma, José Luis (2016). "May Day in Spain: Socialist and Anarchist Traditions". The Ritual of May Day in Western Europe. Routledge. ISBN 9781315553344.
- Torres, Maggie (2019). "Epilogue". Anarchism and Political Change in Spain: Schism, Polarisation and Reconstruction of the Confederación Nacional del Trabajo, 1939-1979. Sussex Academic Press. pp. 206–207. ISBN 9781845199364.
- van der Walt, Lucien; Schmidt, Michael (2009). "Dual Unionism, Reforms, and Other Tactical Debates". Black Flame: The Revolutionary Class Politics of Anarchism and Syndicalism. Edinburgh: AK Press. pp. 211–238. ISBN 978-1-904859-16-1. LCCN 2006933558. OCLC 1100238201.
