= Intersindical Alternativa de Catalunya =

The Intersindical Alternativa de Catalunya (IAC) is a Catalan trade union organization of a confederal nature that brings together several sectoral unions, mainly in the public sector. It is characterized by an assembly model and is part of the current of alternative trade unionism. It has a prominent presence among the civil service personnel of the Generalitat de Catalunya.

According to its documentation, the IAC defines itself as a class, assembly and independent trade union organization. It defends the direct participation of the membership, it supports provision of public services and seeks the improvement of working conditions.

== History ==
The IAC was formally established on 30 November 1997, thus providing coordination between several public sector unions. The founding unions were CATAC-CTS, CAU, IAC-CATAC and USTEC-STEs. Later, other organizations such as the FTC and the Sindicat Ferroviari (SF) were incorporated.

The IAC is one of the principal organizations within Catalan alternative trade unionism, especially in sectors such as education and public administration.

== Structure and organization ==
The IAC is organized as a confederation of unions with assembly-like functioning. Its main bodies are:

- Confederal Congress: highest decision-making body.
- Confederal National Council: direction between congresses.
- Confederal National Secretariat: executive body.
- Permanent Secretariat: in charge of ordinary management.
- Guarantees Commission: responsible for compliance with the statutes.

It also has a group of retirees and pensioners, territorial coordinators and various functional secretariats. Its spokespeople are Assumpta Barbens and David Caño.

== Union activity ==
=== Relations and alliances ===
The IAC is part of the Taula Sindical de Catalunya, a space for coordinating alternative and combative unionism that brings together several union organizations, including the General Confederation of Labor (CGT), the National Confederation of Labor (CNT), the Coordinadora Obrera Sindical (COS), the Union of Base Commissions (Co.bas) and Solidaritat Obrera.

This space acts as a unitary platform to promote mobilizations, public positions and joint calls in the labor and social fields, especially in defense of public services, labor rights and international solidarity actions. The IAC's participation in this field reinforces its role within alternative unionism in Catalonia.

=== Calls to action ===
The IAC has participated in several labor and social mobilizations. Among the most prominent is the participation in the general strike of 3 October 2017, called in the context of the referendum on the independence of Catalonia. It also participated in the strike calls of 8 March in the framework of the feminist strike. In 2019, it was part of strike calls in defense of rights and freedoms.

=== International mobilizations ===
The IAC has participated in international solidarity mobilizations, especially in relation to the genocide in Gaza. On 15 October 2025, it called for a general strike in solidarity with Palestine, with a call to “stop everything” in the face of the situation of crimes against humanity. The day was developed with mobilizations and monitoring in various economic and labor sectors, as well as demonstrations in different parts of Catalonia.

This call occurred in a context of international mobilizations and denunciation of actions against civil initiatives in support of Palestine, such as the assault on the Global Sumud Flotilla of 2025, an international mission with the participation of activists, among whom were people linked to the IAC’s union environment.

In continuation of these mobilizations, in April 2026 members of the IAC formed part of a Catalan delegation of about 40 people that participated in a new initiative of the Global Sumud Flotilla, with the aim of bringing humanitarian aid to the Gaza Strip.
