= 2010 Spanish general strike =

General strike on September 29, 2010, in Spain against pension reforms

The 2010 General Strike in Spain was a general strike called for Wednesday, 29 September 2010 in Spain by the two main Spanish trade union centrals—Comisiones Obreras and Unión General de Trabajadores—against the labor reform of 2010, promoted by the government of José Luis Rodríguez Zapatero and approved in the Congress of Deputies on 9 September 2010, entering into force on 19 September 2010, and against the reform of the public pension system announced by the Government of Spain.

Other unions (CGT, USO), national and international organizations and associations (Attac) joined the call. The strike was against labour reform, wages cut in public sector and pension freezes. It was organised by CCOO, UGT and CGT. Ten Million workers went out of work to participate in the strike. In the specific cases of Navarra and the Basque Country, the LAB and ELA unions convened the strike for June 29, 2010.

== General strikes in Europe ==
Because of the 2008 financial crisis, there have been cutbacks, directed fundamentally against workers; the trade union response has been demonstrations and strikes:30 before September 29 (in Greece and France), on September 29 itself (demonstration in Brussels and general strike in Spain), and afterwards (in France). For some authors, such as Michael Hudson, the European workers' demonstrations and strikes are not merely reactions to unemployment and economic recession but responses to the drastic neoliberal proposals - promoted by the European Central Bank, the European Commission and the IMF - to modify the laws and the structure of the functioning of European society that will affect the next generations. For this author, these neoliberal proposals can be described as a financial coup d'état.

== See also ==
- List of strikes in Spain
- Anti-austerity movement in Spain
