= X:talk =

UK cooperative to support migrant sex workers

X:talk project
- Formation: 2006
- Founded at: Brothel in South London
- Type: Worker cooperative
- Headquarters: London
- Website: www.xtalkproject.net

The x:talk project is a London-based network of sex workers and migrants' rights activists who organise, co-ordinate, and deliver free English classes for workers in the sex industry.

== Purpose and activities ==
x:talk is listed on the Co-operatives UK website as a workers' co-op. It began in 2007 when an Australian in London, studying post-colonial theory and involved in the International Union of Sex Workers, became aware that some of the escorts working alongside her were subject to debt bondage and other forms of abuse, and lacked the English language skills to negotiate a better deal. A group was formed which successfully applied for a grant from the trust associated with Feminist Review, an academic journal, and found support and space from the NHS.

The project is open to all migrant sex workers and is designed to help them communicate better at work and with clients, managers, and landlords in a safe and confidential environment. x:talk aims to "create an open and critical space to organise and empower workers in the sex industry and to encourage critical interventions into discourses about gender, labour, migration and human rights. The project is a conscious effort to make contact with migrant communities, offer a practical and useful service, and are active in the struggle for sex workers' rights. The activists behind the x:talk Project believe in "the autonomy of all people moving across borders and the dignity of every gender employing their resources in the sex industry".

As well as free English classes, other events are organised such as free breakfasts and pole dancing workshops.

== Collective pen name ==
To avoid any of the members obtaining celebrity status or being stigmatised, the members use the collective pen name of "Ava Caradonna":

"Ava Caradonna is a migrant, a sex worker, a student, a mother, a citizen, a transgender, a person of colour, a teacher, a lesbian and a militant- she allows us to speak from different positions as sex workers and as allies, without the stigma of using our ‘real’ names and allows us to speak to the different realities in the sex industry and beyond."

== Policy work ==
In 2010, x:talk produced the report Human Rights, Sex Work and The Challenge of Trafficking. It was a study of anti-trafficking policy and whether it had been used to advance the abolition of sex work. Amongst its recommendations were the decriminalisation of sex work and the signing and ratification of the International Convention on the Protection of the Rights of All Migrant Workers and Members of Their Families.

== See also ==
- Migrants Rights Network
- Modern immigration to the United Kingdom
- Prostitution in the United Kingdom
- Sex/Work Strike
