= Clarence Lee Swartz =

American anarchist (1868–1936)

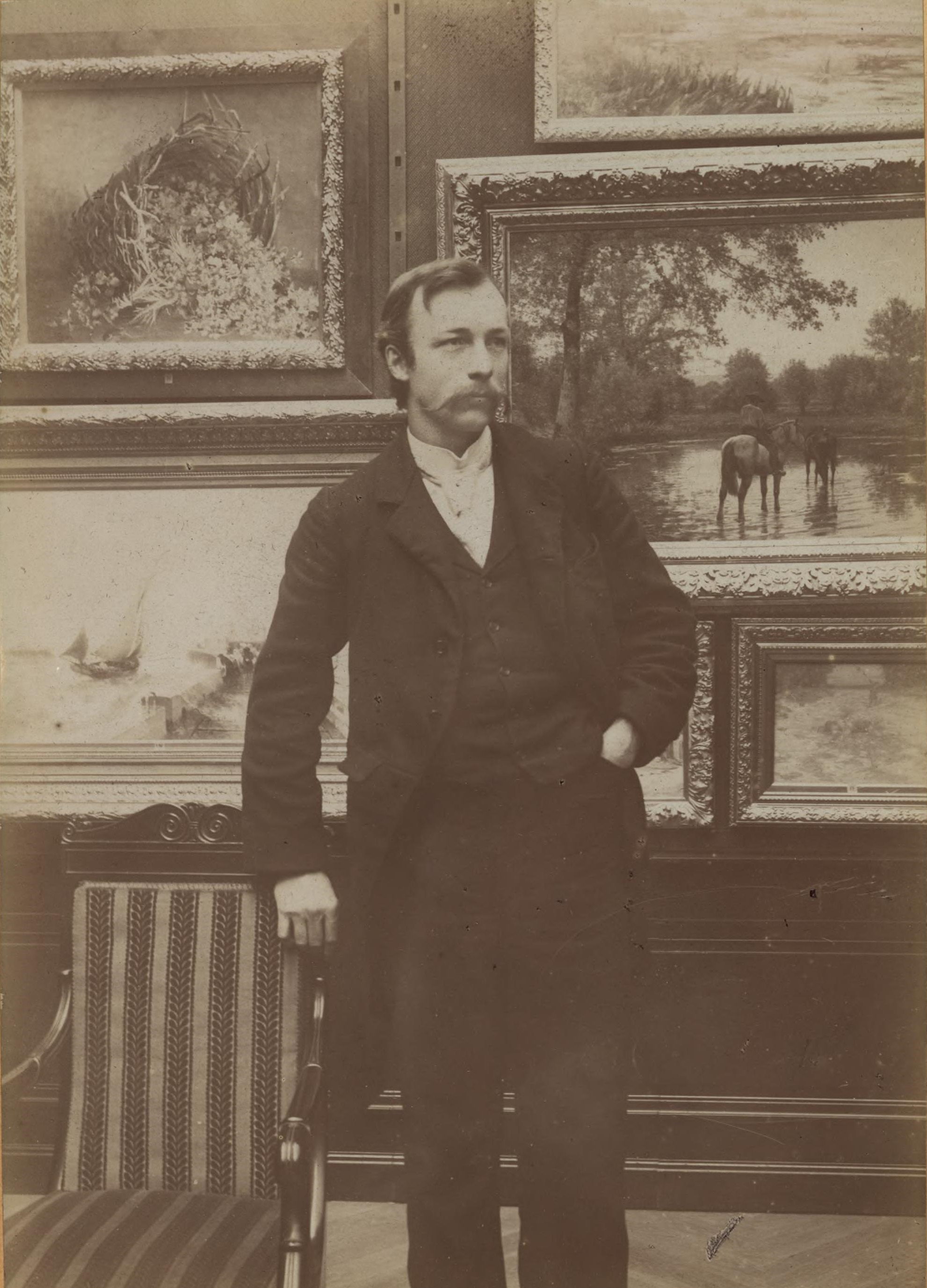
- Portrait of Swartz in Paris (1 January 1900)
- Born: 1868
- Died: 1936 (aged 67–68)
- Writing career
- Language: English
- Years active: 1890s-on
- Period: Progressive Era
- Subjects: Mutualism and Individualistism
- Notable work: What is Mutualism?

Clarence Lee Swartz (1868–1936) was an American individualist anarchist, whose best-known work, What is Mutualism? (1927) is a book explaining the economic system of mutualism.

Swartz was a friend of Benjamin Tucker and frequent contributor of signed and unsigned editorials to Tucker's newspaper Liberty. In addition, he worked for a series of anarchist newspapers and journals. He worked in the mechanical department of Liberty beginning in 1891, edited an anarchist journal called Voice of the People and served as assistant editor for Moses Harman's journal Lucifer, the Light-Bearer in 1890. Swartz was arrested in Kansas City, Missouri for distributing a newspaper called Sunday Sun in 1891. The charges were dropped when the prosecutor failed to show in court. He published two individualist anarchist periodicals at the turn of the century, I (beginning in 1898) and The Free Comrade (beginning in 1900). In 1908, Tucker's publishing business, including most of his books and plates, were destroyed in a fire and after Tucker retired from publishing and moved to Europe, "practically all of the literature of individualist anarchism [went] out of print".

Swartz made efforts throughout the 1920s to revive the individualist literature. He prepared and edited Individual Liberty: Selections from the Writings of Benjamin R. Tucker (New York: Vanguard Press), a collection of excerpts from Tucker's writing in Liberty, which was the first collection of Tucker's writing since Tucker's own collection Instead of a Book. In 1923 he worked together with Charles T. Sprading and J. William Lloyd on The Libertarian, a magazine opposed to blue laws, Prohibition and the censorship of arts and entertainment.
