= Social anarchism =

Branch of anarchism emphasizing social solidarity

Social anarchism, also known as left-wing anarchism or socialist anarchism, is an anarchist tradition that sees individual liberty and social solidarity as interlinked.

It advocates for a social revolution to eliminate hierarchical power structures, such as capitalism and the state, and establish economy based on collective ownership of means of production, distribution and economic planning. In their place, social anarchists encourage voluntary social collaboration through mutual aid and envision non-hierarchical forms of social organization, such as networks of popular assemblies and worker cooperatives.

Identified with the socialist tradition of Mikhail Bakunin and Peter Kropotkin, social anarchism is often contrasted with individualist anarchism.

== Political principles ==
Social anarchism is opposed to all forms of hierarchical power structures, and oppression, including (but not limited to) the State and capitalism. Social anarchism sees liberty as interconnected with social solidarity, and considers the maximization of one to be necessary for the maximization of the other. As such, social anarchism seeks to guarantee equal rights to freedom and material security for all persons.

Social anarchism envisions the overthrow of capitalism and the state in a social revolution, which would establish a federal society of voluntary associations and local communities, based on a network of mutual aid.

The key principles that form the core of social anarchism include anti-capitalism, anti-statism and prefigurative politics.

=== Anti-capitalism ===
As an anti-capitalist ideology, social anarchism is opposed to the dominant expressions of capitalism, including the expansion of transnational corporations through globalization. It comprises one of the main forms of socialism, alongside utopian socialism, democratic socialism and authoritarian socialism. Social anarchism rejects private property, particularly private ownership of the means of production, as the principal source of social inequality. As such, social anarchists typically oppose propertarianism, as they consider it to exacerbate social and economic inequality, suppress individual agency and require the maintenance of hierarchical institutions.

Social anarchists argue that the abolition of private property would lead to the development of new social mores, encouraging mutual respect for individual freedom and the satisfaction of individual needs. Social anarchism therefore advocates the breaking up of monopolies and the institution of common ownership over the means of production. Instead of capitalist markets, with their profit motives and wage systems, social anarchism desires to organise production through a collective system of worker cooperatives, agricultural communes and labour syndicates.

While social anarchism has rejected the statism of Orthodox Marxism, it has also drawn from Marxist critiques of capitalism, particularly Marx's theory of alienation. Social anarchists have also been reluctant to adopt the Marxist centring of the proletariat as revolutionary agents, instead identifying the revolutionary potential of the socially excluded segments of society.

=== Anti-statism ===
As an anti-statist ideology, social anarchism opposes the concentration of power in the form of a State. To social anarchists, the state is a type of coercive hierarchy designed to enforce private property and to limit individual self-development. Social anarchists reject both centralised and limited forms of government, instead upholding social collaboration as a means to achieve a spontaneous order, without any social contract supplanting social relations. Social anarchists believe that the abolition of the state will lead to greater "freedom, flourishing and fairness".

In the place of a state structure, social anarchists desire anarchy, which can be defined as a society without government. Social anarchists oppose the use of a state structure to achieve their goals of a stateless and classless society, as they consider statism to be an inherently corrupting influence. They thus have criticised the Marxist conception of the "dictatorship of the proletariat", which they consider to be elitist, and have rejected the possibility of a "withering away of the state".

However, some social anarchists such as Noam Chomsky sometimes hold state hierarchy to be preferable to economic hierarchy, and thus lend their support to welfare state programs like universal health care that can improve people's material conditions.

=== Prefigurative politics ===
Alongside its opposition to political and economic hierarchies, social anarchism upholds prefigurative politics, considering it necessary for the means to achieve anarchy be consistent with that end goal. Social anarchism prefigures itself through participatory and consensus decision-making, which are capable of generating the diversification of political values, tactics and identities.

Social anarchism therefore promotes self-organization and the cultivation of a participatory culture, encouraging individuals to "do things for themselves". Social anarchism upholds direct action as a means for people to themselves resist oppression, without subordinating their own agency to democratic representatives or revolutionary vanguards. Social anarchists thus reject the political party model of organization, instead preferring forms of flat organization without any fixed leadership.

=== Social equality ===
Social anarchism values social equality, in that it is opposed to the inequalities produced by hierarchies. It is not opposed to all inequality, instead seeing inequalities based on need, that require fundamentally different treatment, to be acceptable and sometimes desirable. Social anarchism sees inequalities of rank or hierarchy, or gross material inequalities, as damaging to society and individuals. Social anarchists believe that a society organised non-hierarchically would eliminate much of the inequality that presently exists. The goal of social anarchism cannot be understood to be equality alone.

== Schools of thought ==
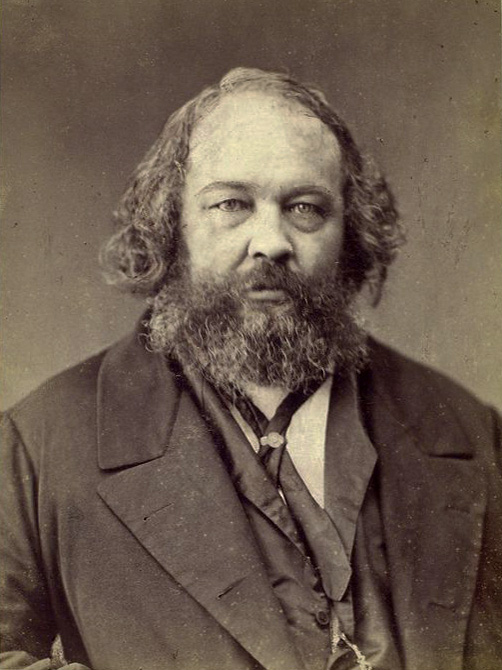
Mikhail Bakunin, founding figure of collectivist anarchism

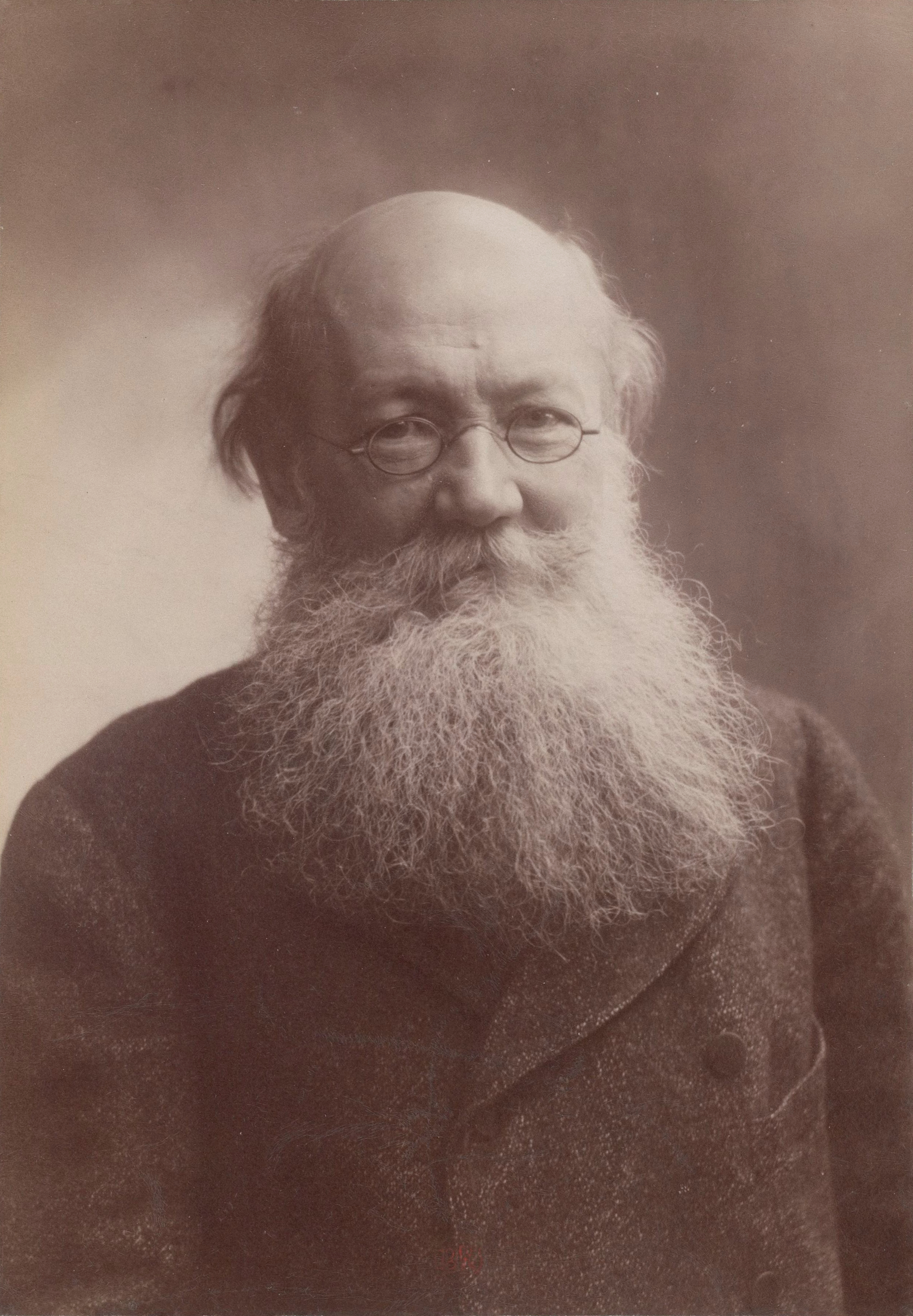
Peter Kropotkin, founding figure of communist anarchism

Characterised by its loose definition and ideological diversity, social anarchism has lent itself to syncretism, both drawing from and influencing other ideological critiques of oppression, and giving way to a number of different anarchist schools of thought.

While early forms of anarchism were largely individualistic, the influence of Left Hegelianism infused anarchism with socialistic tendencies, leading to the constitution of social anarchism. Over time, the question of the economic makeup of a future anarchist society drove the development of social anarchist thought. The first school of social anarchism was formulated by Pierre-Joseph Proudhon, whose theory of mutualism retained a form of private property, advocating for enterprises to be self-managed by worker cooperatives, which would compensate its workers in labour vouchers issued by "people's banks". This was later supplanted by Mikhail Bakunin's collectivist anarchism, which advocated for the collective ownership of all property, but retained a form of individual compensation. This finally led to the development of anarcho-communism by Peter Kropotkin, who considered that resources should be freely distributed "from each according to their ability, to each according to their needs", without money or wages. Social anarchists also adopted the strategy of syndicalism, which saw trade unions as the basis for a new socialist economy, with anarcho-syndicalism growing to its greatest influence during the Spanish Revolution of 1936.

The main division within social anarchism is over the means for achieving anarchy, with philosophical anarchists advocating for peaceful persuasion, while insurrectionary anarchists advocated for "propaganda of the deed". The former have upheld an anarchist form of education, free from coercion and dogmatism, in order to establish a self-governing society. The latter have participated in rebellions in which they expropriated and collectivised property, and replaced the state with a network of autonomous and federally-linked communes. The aim was to build a socialist society, without using the state, from the bottom-up.

Principles of social anarchism, such as decentralisation, anti-authoritarianism and mutual aid, later held a key influence on the new social movements of the late-20th century. It was particularly influential within the New Left and green politics, with the green anarchist tendency of social ecology drawing directly from social anarchism. Social anarchist strategies of direct action and spontaneity also formed the foundation of the black bloc tactic, which has become a staple of contemporary anarchism. The social anarchist principle of prefiguration has also been shared by sections of anti-state Marxism, particularly that of autonomism.

In the contemporary era, anarcho-communism and anarcho-syndicalism are the dominant tendencies of social anarchism.

== Distinction from individualism ==
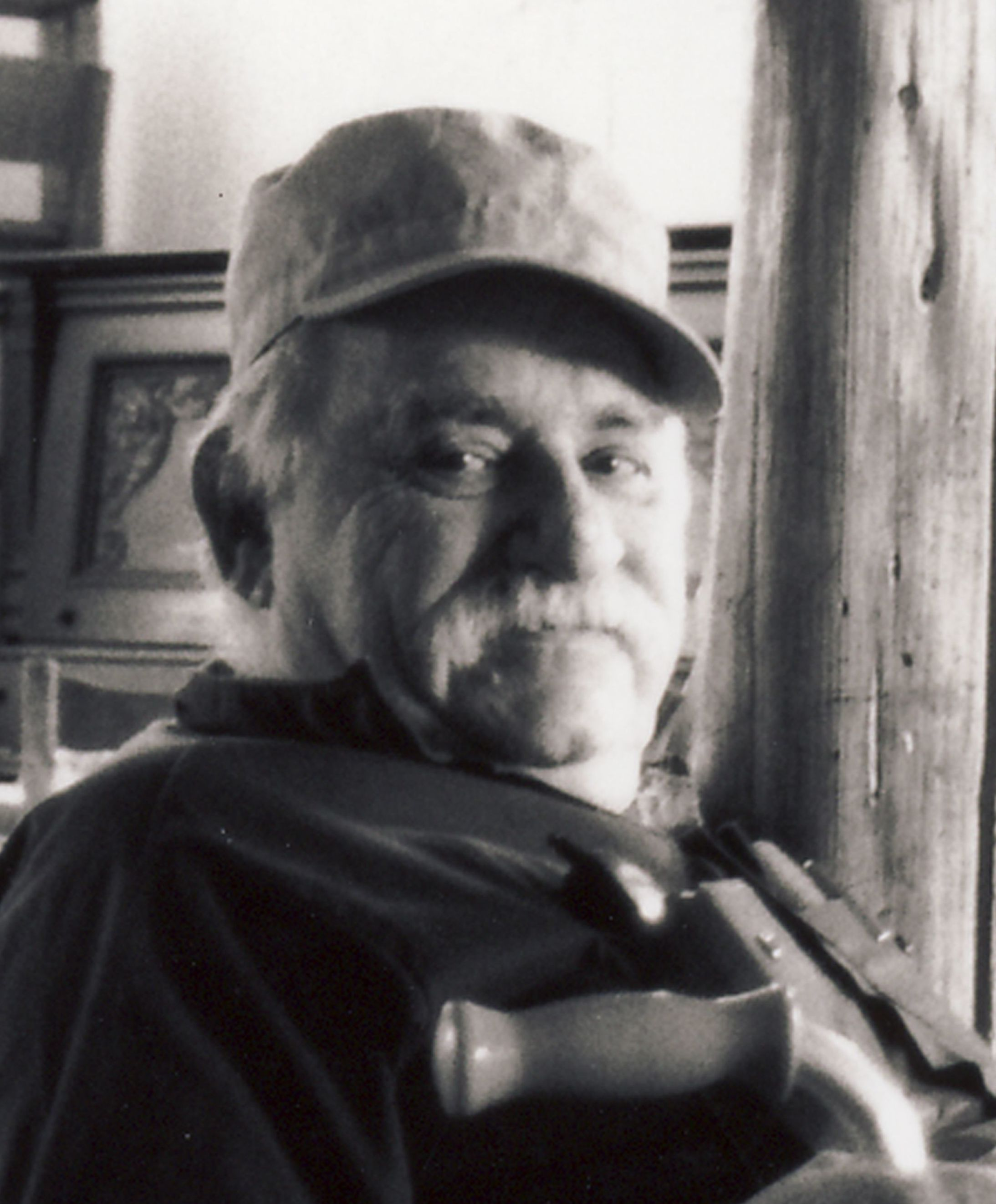
The social anarchist Murray Bookchin, who contrasted the tendency against individualist anarchism and claimed there to be an "unbridgeable chasm" that separated the two.

Social anarchism is commonly distinguished from individualist anarchism, the latter of which favours individual sovereignty and property, and can even oppose all forms of social organization altogether. While individualists worry that social anarchism could lead to tyranny of the majority and forced collaboration, social anarchists criticise individualism for encouraging competition and atomizing individuals from each other. Individualism was heavily criticised by classical social anarchists, such as Bakunin and Kropotkin, who held that the liberty of a few individuals was potentially harmful to the equality of all mankind.

However, this distinction is also contested, as anarchism itself is often seen as a synthesis of liberal individualism and social egalitarianism. Some social anarchists, such as Emma Goldman and Herbert Read, were even directly inspired by the individualist philosophy of Max Stirner. Social anarchism generally attempts to reconcile individual freedoms with the freedom of others, in order to maximise the freedom of everyone and allow for individuality to flourish. Individualists and social anarchists have even been able to cooperate by upholding "communal individuality", emphasising both individual freedom and community strength. Some social anarchists have argued that the divisions between them and the individualists can be overcome, by emphasising their shared commitment to anti-capitalism and anti-authoritarianism. But others draw the line at forms of individualism that uphold hierarchical power relations.

In his 1995 book, Social Anarchism or Lifestyle Anarchism, Murray Bookchin defined social anarchism in contrast to what he called "lifestyle anarchism". According to Bookchin, it was impossible for the two tendencies to coexist, claiming there to be an "unbridgeable chasm" that separated them from each other. Bookchin held social anarchism to be the only genuine form of anarchism, considering individualism to be inherently oppressive. But his separation of the two tendencies has been criticised and even rejected entirely by other anarchists. His analysis has been criticised as "reductive" and "undialectical", due to his failure to recognise the many connections and interrelations between the two tendencies.

Although sometimes considered a form of individualist anarchism, anarcho-capitalism is typically rejected as a legitimate anarchist school of thought by most anarchists, who uphold anti-capitalism as a central principle. The two have engaged in a contested debate over the term "libertarian", which was initially a synonym for the "left-libertarian" social anarchism but was later also claimed by "right-libertarian" anarcho-capitalists, with each rejecting the "libertarian" credentials of the other. In contrast, social anarchists accept American individualist anarchists like Benjamin Tucker and Lysander Spooner as genuine, due in part to their opposition to capitalism. In turn, modern anti-capitalist individualists like formerly Kevin Carson have drawn inspiration from social anarchism, while retaining their pro-market views. Libertarian scholar Roderick T. Long has thus suggested that left-wing market anarchists could use their position to mediate between social anarchists and anarcho-capitalists, arguing for an ecumenical view of anarchism and libertarianism.

== See also ==
- Social anarchists (category)

== Bibliography ==
- Adams, Ian (2001) [1993]. "Anarchism". Political Ideology Today (2nd ed.). Manchester University Press. pp. 120–126. ISBN 0-7190-6020-6.
- Busky, Donald F. (2000). "Defining Democratic Socialism". Democratic Socialism: A Global Survey. Greenwood Publishing Group. pp. 1–14. ISBN 978-0275968861.
- Davis, Laurence (2018). "Individual and Community". In Adams, Matthew S.; Levy, Carl (eds.). The Palgrave Handbook of Anarchism. London: Palgrave Macmillan. pp. 47–90. doi:10.1007/978-3-319-75620-2_3. ISBN 978-3319756196. S2CID 150149495.
- Firth, Rhiannon (2018). "Utopianism and Intentional Communities" (PDF). In Adams, Matthew S.; Levy, Carl (eds.). The Palgrave Handbook of Anarchism. London: Palgrave Macmillan. pp. 491–510. doi:10.1007/978-3-319-75620-2_28. ISBN 978-3319756196. S2CID 149636440.
- Franks, Benjamin (August 2013). "Anarchism". In Freeden, Michael; Stears, Marc (eds.). The Oxford Handbook of Political Ideologies. Oxford University Press. pp. 385–404. doi:10.1093/oxfordhb/9780199585977.013.0001. ISBN 978-0-19-958597-7.
- Franks, Benjamin (2018a). "Anarchism and Ethics". In Adams, Matthew S.; Levy, Carl (eds.). The Palgrave Handbook of Anarchism. London: Palgrave Macmillan. pp. 549–570. doi:10.1007/978-3-319-75620-2_31. ISBN 978-3319756196. S2CID 149845918.
- Franks, Benjamin (2018b). "Prefiguration". In Franks, Benjamin; Jun, Nathan; Williams, Leonard (eds.). Anarchism: A Conceptual Approach. Routledge. pp. 28–43. ISBN 978-1-138-92565-6. LCCN 2017044519.
- Harrell, Willie J. Jr. (2012). ""I am an Anarchist": The Social Anarchism of Lucy E. Parsons". Journal of International Women's Studies. 13 (1): 1–18. ISSN 1539-8706. OCLC 8093224507.
- Jun, Nathan (2018). "Freedom". In Franks, Benjamin; Jun, Nathan; Williams, Leonard (eds.). Anarchism: A Conceptual Approach. Routledge. pp. 44–59. ISBN 978-1-138-92565-6. LCCN 2017044519.
- Long, Roderick T. (2017). "Anarchism and Libertarianism". In Jun, Nathan J. (ed.). Brill's Companion to Anarchism and Philosophy. Brill. pp. 285–317. doi:10.1163/9789004356894_012. ISBN 978-90-04-35689-4.
- Long, Roderick T. (2020). "The Anarchist Landscape". In Chartier, Gary; Van Schoelandt, Chad (eds.). The Routledge Handbook of Anarchy and Anarchist Thought. New York: Routledge. pp. 28–38. doi:10.4324/9781315185255-2. ISBN 9781315185255. S2CID 228898569.
- Marshall, Peter H. (2008) [1992]. Demanding the Impossible: A History of Anarchism. London: Harper Perennial. ISBN 978-0-00-686245-1. OCLC 218212571.
- McLaughlin, Paul (2007). Anarchism and Authority: A Philosophical Introduction to Classical Anarchism. Aldershot: Ashgate Publishing. ISBN 978-0-7546-6196-2. LCCN 2007007973.
- Morland, David (1997). Demanding the Impossible? Human Nature and Politics in Nineteenth-Century Social Anarchism. Cassell. ISBN 0-304-33685-8. LCCN 97-1672.
- Morland, David (2004). "Anti-capitalism and poststructuralist anarchism". In Bowen, James; Purkis, Jon (eds.). Changing Anarchism: Anarchist Theory and Practice in a Global Age. Manchester University Press. pp. 23–38. ISBN 0-7190-6694-8.
- Morris, Brian (2017). "Anarchism and Environmental Philosophy". In Jun, Nathan J. (ed.). Brill's Companion to Anarchism and Philosophy. Brill. pp. 369–400. doi:10.1163/9789004356894_015. ISBN 978-90-04-35689-4.
- Ostergaard, Geoffrey (1991) [1983]. "Anarchism". In Bottomore, Tom (ed.). A Dictionary of Marxist Thought (2nd ed.). Blackwell Publishing. pp. 21–23. ISBN 0-631-16481-2. LCCN 91-17658.
- Ostergaard, Geoffrey (2006) [1993]. "Anarchism". In Outhwaite, William (ed.). The Blackwell Dictionary of Modern Social Thought (2 ed.). Blackwell Publishing. pp. 12–14. doi:10.1002/9780470999028.ch1. ISBN 9780470999028.
- Spafford, Jesse (2020). "Social Anarchism and the Rejection of Private Property". In Chartier, Gary; Van Schoelandt, Chad (eds.). The Routledge Handbook of Anarchy and Anarchist Thought. New York: Routledge. pp. 327–341. doi:10.4324/9781315185255-23. ISBN 9781315185255. S2CID 228898569.
- Spafford, Jesse (October 2023). Social Anarchism and the Rejection of Moral Tyranny. Cambridge University Press. ISBN 978-1-00-937544-3.
- Suissa, Judith (2001). "Anarchism, Utopias and Philosophy of Education". Journal of Philosophy of Education. 35 (4): 627–646. doi:10.1111/1467-9752.00249.
- Thagard, Paul (2000). "Ethics and Politics". Coherence in Thought and Action. MIT Press. pp. 149–154. ISBN 0-262-20131-3. LCCN 00-035503.
