= William Batchelder Greene =

American minister and activist (1819–1878)

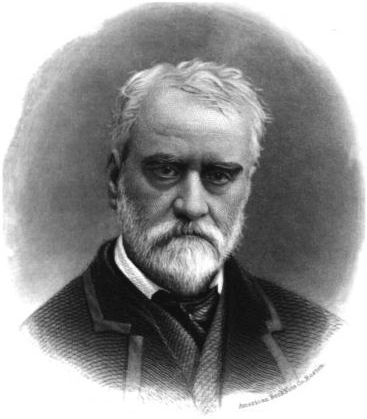
- Born: April 4, 1819; Haverhill, Massachusetts, US
- Died: May 30, 1878 (aged 59); Somerset, England
- Occupations: Anarchist, minister, political scientist
- Known for: Mutual Banking

Academic background
- Education: Harvard (1841)
- Thesis: De cosinuum et sinuum potestatibus secundum cosinus et sinus arcuum multiplicium evolvendis / von Ernst Eduard Kummer (1832)

Academic work
- Doctoral students: Paul Du Bois-Reymond

William Batchelder Greene (April 4, 1819 – May 30, 1878) was an American individualist anarchist, Unitarian minister, soldier, mutualist, promoter of free banking in the United States, and member of the First International.

== Biography ==
Born in Haverhill, Massachusetts, Greene was the son of the Democratic journalist and Boston postmaster Nathaniel Greene. He was appointed to the United States Military Academy from Massachusetts in 1835, but he left before graduation. He was made 2nd lieutenant in the 7th infantry in July 1839 and after serving in the second Seminole War resigned in November 1841. Subsequently, he was connected with George Ripley's utopian movement at Brook Farm, after which he met several transcendentalists including Orestes Brownson, Elizabeth Peabody and Ralph Waldo Emerson.

According to James J. Martin in Men Against the State, Greene did not become a "full-fledged anarchist" until the last decade of his life, but his writings show that by 1850 he had articulated a Christian mutualism, drawing heavily on the writings of Pierre-Joseph Proudhon's sometimes-antagonist Pierre Leroux (see Equality; 1849 and Mutual Banking; 1850), writing in The Radical Deficiency of Existing Circulating Medium (1857):

The existing organization of credit is the daughter of hard money, begotten upon it incestuously by that insufficiency of circulating medium which results from laws making specie the sole legal tender. The immediate consequences of confused credit are want of confidence, loss of time, commercial frauds, fruitless and repeated applications for payment, complicated with irregular and ruinous expanses. The ultimate consequences are compositions, bad debts, expensive accommodation-loans, law-suits, insolvency, bankruptcy, separation of classes, hostility, hunger, extravagance, distress, riots, civil war, and, finally, revolution. The natural consequences of mutual banking are, first of all, the creation of order, and the definitive establishment of due organization in the social body, and, ultimately, the cure of all the evils. which flow from the present incoherence and disruption in the relations of production and commerce.

In his radical, anonymously published pamphlet Equality, Greene had this to say about equality before the law: "It is right that persons should be equal before the law: but when we have established equality before the law, our work is but half done. We ought to have EQUAL LAWS also".

Greene spent his final days in Somerset, England. His remains were transported to Boston to be buried at Forest Hills, Roxbury (Jamaica Plain).

== Noted works ==
- Mutual Banking. Boston: New England Labor Reform League, 1870.
- Remarks on the Science of History, followed by an a priori Autobiography (1849).
- Equality. West Brookfield, Mass.: O.S. Cooke, 1849.
- Mutual Banking. West Brookfield, Mass.: O.S. Cooke, 1850.
- Sovereignty of the People, pamphlet (Boston, 1863).
- Heywood, Ezra and William B. Greene. Declaration of Sentiments and Constitution of the New England Labor Reform League . Boston, Weekly American Workman, 1869.
- Explanations of the Theory of the Calculus, pamphlet (1870).
- Transcendentalism, pamphlet (1870).
- Theory of the Calculus (1870).
- The Facts of Consciousness and the Philosophy of Mr. Herbert Spencer, pamphlet (1871).
- The Blazing Star: With an Appendix Treating of the Jewish Kabbala. Also, a Tract on the Philosophy of Mr. Herbert Spencer and One on New-England Transcendentalism. Boston: A. William and Co., 1872.
- The Working Woman: A letter to the Rev. Henry W. Foote, Minister of King's Chapel, in vindication of the poorer class of the Boston working-women. Princeton, Mass.: Co-operative Pub. Co. (1873).
- Socialistic, Communistic, Mutualistic, and Financial Fragments (1875).
- International Address: An elaborate, comprehensive, and very entertaining Exposition of the principles of the Working-People's International Association.

== See also ==
- Individualist anarchism in the United States
