= Benjamin Tucker =

American individualist anarchist (1854–1939)

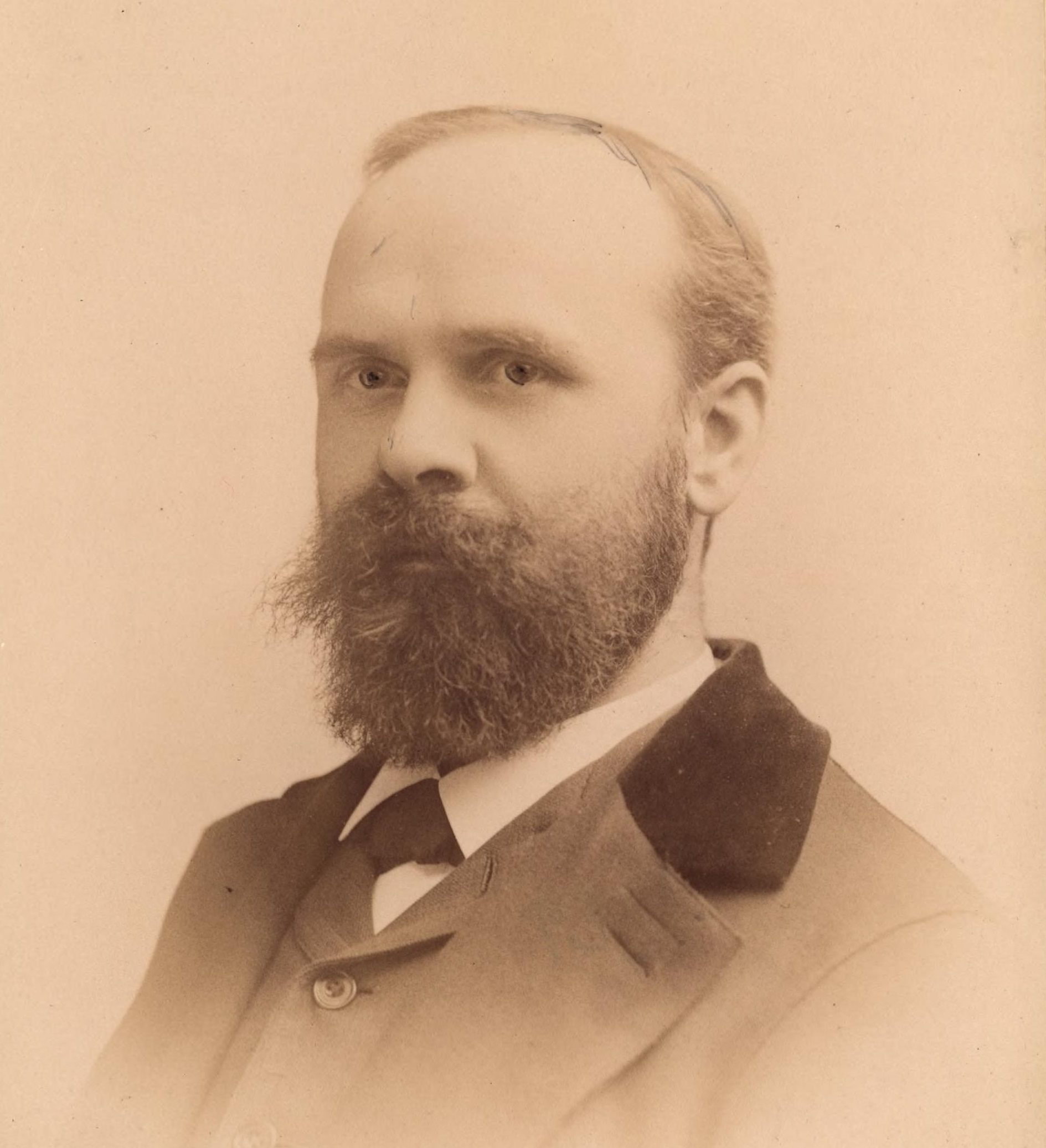
- Born: Benjamin Ricketson Tucker; April 17, 1854; South Dartmouth, Massachusetts, U.S.
- Died: June 22, 1939 (aged 85); Monaco
- Occupations: Editor, publisher, writer

Philosophical work
- Era: Modern philosophy: 19th-century philosophy; 20th-century philosophy
- Region: Western philosophy: American philosophy
- School: Individualist anarchism Libertarian socialism Mutualism
- Main interests: Politics, economics

Benjamin Ricketson Tucker (/ˈtʌkər/; April 17, 1854 – June 22, 1939) was an American individualist anarchist and self-identified socialist. Tucker was the editor and publisher of the American individualist anarchist periodical Liberty (1881–1908). Tucker described his form of anarchism as "consistent Manchesterism" and "unterrified Jeffersonianism".

Tucker looked upon anarchism as a part of the broader socialist movement. Tucker harshly opposed state socialism and was a supporter of free-market socialism and libertarian socialism which he termed anarchist or anarchistic socialism. He connected Josiah Warren, Karl Marx and Pierre-Joseph Proudhon to socialism. Some modern commentators have described Tucker as an anarcho-capitalist, although this has been disputed by others. During his lifetime, Tucker opposed capitalism and considered himself a socialist due to wanting to increase human welfare by acting upon social relations and environment, rather than on nature of individuals, and his support for preventing possession of wealth from being a means of levying on the product of labor.

Tucker connected his libertarian socialist economic views which included his opposition to non-labor income in the form of profit, interest and rent with those of Josiah Warren, Proudhon and Marx while arguing against American anti-socialists who declared socialism as imported.

== Biography ==
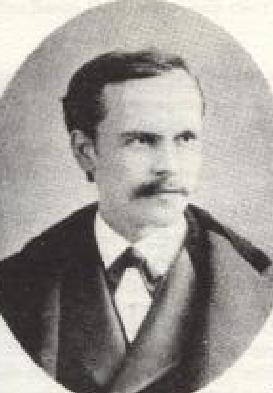
Tucker at a young age

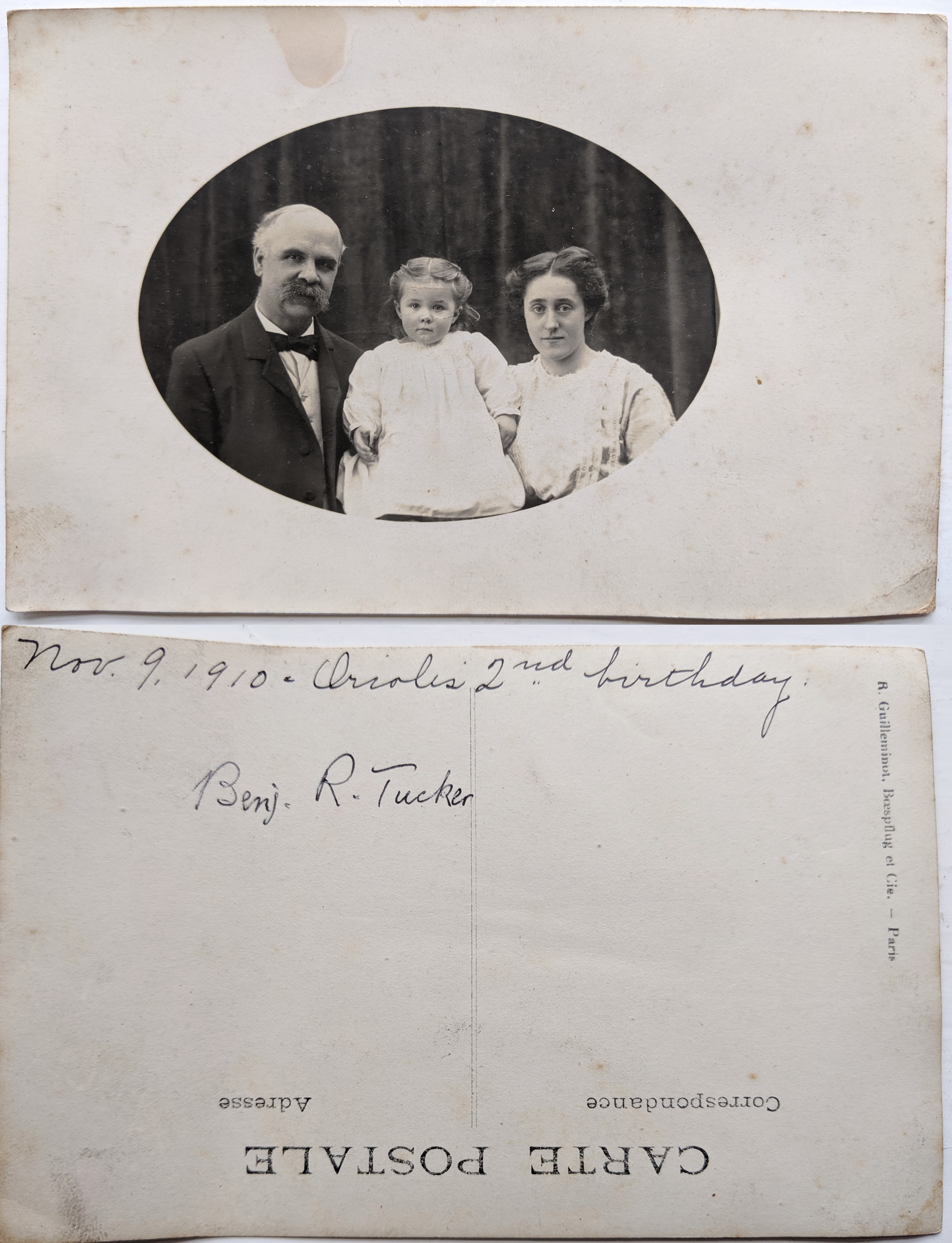
Benjamin Tucker with Oriole Tucker and Pearl Johnson

Tucker made his editorial debut in anarchist circles in 1876, when Ezra Heywood published Tucker's English translation of Pierre-Joseph Proudhon's classic work What is Property? In 1877, he published his first original journal Radical Review, but it ran for only four issues. From August 1881 to April 1908, Tucker published Liberty, a major individualist-anarchist periodical. The periodical was instrumental in developing and formalizing the American form of individualist anarchist philosophy through publishing essays and serving as a format for debate. Included in its masthead is a quote from Proudhon saying that liberty is "Not the Daughter But the Mother of Order".

In 1939, Tucker died in the company of his family in Monaco and carried his beliefs to his deathbed.

Towards the end of Tucker's life, anarchist Victor Yarros described him as a "forceful and clear writer, but a poor speaker" who considered writing for bourgeois newspapers to be "the worst form of prostitution".

== Political views ==
=== Anarchism ===
Tucker said that he became an anarchist at the age of eighteen. In the anarchist periodical Liberty, he published the original work of Pierre-Joseph Proudhon, Herbert Spencer, Stephen Pearl Andrews, Joshua K. Ingalls, Josiah Warren, Lysander Spooner, Auberon Herbert, Dyer Lum, Victor Yarros, Max Stirner and Lillian Harman (daughter of free love anarchist Moses Harman) as well as his own writing.

==== Anarchist society ====
Tucker disapproved of government ownership because to him state control was the most complete and most obnoxious form of monopoly, "a tyrant living by theft ... wasteful, careless, clumsy, and short-sighted". Tucker maintained that all forms of authoritarian activities imply the resort to force and nothing good or lasting was ever accomplished by compulsion. Thus, he refused to condone the overthrow of the state by violent means, arguing that abolishing government would likely result in physical conflicts over land and a reaction to restore the old regime. Hence, Tucker preached widespread education and ultimately a passive resistance that was to take forms such as refusal to pay taxes, the evasion of jury duty and military service and the non-observance of compulsion. Once society reached this state, individual liberty for all would prevail as a matter of course.

Tucker envisioned an individualist anarchist society with "each man reaping the fruits of his labour and no man able to live in idleness on an income from capital ... become[ing] a great hive of Anarchistic workers, prosperous and free individuals [combining] to carry on their production and distribution on the cost principle"

==== Means ====
Tucker was opposed to both violent revolutions and political reforms, and believed anarchy should be brought by peaceful means of "passive resistance", including tax resistance, workers strikes, general strikes, rent strikes, boycotts, education and replacing state functions by voluntary alternatives.

=== Anti-monopolism ===
Scholar of Proudhon and anarchism Shawn P. Wilbur characterized tuckerite individualism as 'anti-monopolist', in contrast he characterized classical anarchism as 'anti-governmentalist'.

Tucker argued that the poor condition of American workers resulted from four legal monopolies based in the authoritarianism of the state:

1. Money monopoly
2. Land monopoly
3. Tariffs
4. Patents

Tucker believed that his contemporary millionaires received their wealth through the exploitation of monopolies.

For several decades, his focus became the state's economic control of how trade could take place and what currency counted as legitimate. He saw interest and profit as a form of exploitation, made possible by the banking monopoly, in turn maintained through coercion and invasion. Tucker called any such interest and profit usury and saw it as the basis of the oppression of the workers. In his words, "interest is theft, Rent Robbery, and Profit Only Another Name for Plunder". He said that these non-labour usury incomes are merely 'different methods of levying tribute for the use of capital'.

Tucker opposed protectionism, believing that tariffs caused high prices by preventing national producers from having to compete with foreign competitors.

=== Law and order ===
Juries would form the basis of the anarchist legal order imagined by Tucker, they would "judge not only the facts, but the law", the laws would "be little more than suggestions for the guidance of juries" and the law "be so flexible that it will shape itself to every emergency and need no alteration. And it will then be regarded as just in proportion to its flexibility, instead of as now in proportion to its rigidity."

The role of this legal system would be to protect law of equal liberty, which in practice would mean protecting people from bodily harm and protecting property based on labor, that was obtained voluntarily without use of fraud or force.

From the right to equal liberty comes right to contract, and the right to enforce this contract, even by use of force, if that's included in the contract. However contracts that would mean "abdication of... manhood" (slavery) or promise invasion of third parties, would be invalid.

Tucker was a proponent of defense associations, whose membership and funding would be voluntary, and thought they would replace government police in anarchy, ensuring better protection for lower price, and using "any means that may prove necessary" to restrain invaders.

Tucker did not see capital punishment, torture and imprisonment as incompatible with anarchism, according to him they were tools that could be used to do justice, he did not consider rights to life and liberty to be inalienable.

I cannot see why capital punishment should be singled out for emphatic and exceptional denunciation. The same objection applies as clearly to punishment that simply takes away liberty as to punishment that takes away life.

=== Land ownership ===
In Tucker's view land ownership should be limited to the standard of "occupancy and use", which would be above the right to contract, meaning in case of renting a house, the tenant becomes "the owner of both land and house as soon as he becomes the occupant".

In case of landlords trying to evict or demand rent from occupants, Tucker's advice was for "the occupants to combine to maintain their ground by force whenever they see that they can do so successfully."

Disputes on land, just like all other disputes, would be submitted to and judged by juries, which would mean specific customs of land ownership (what constitutes as occupancy and use and does not break equal liberty) would differ as to different communities.

=== Labor rights ===
Tucker objected to what he perceived as exploitation of labor, and believed that only under anarchic socialism would people be rewarded justly for their labor, saying: "When interest, rent, and profit disappear under the influence of free money, free land, and free trade, it will make no difference whether men work for themselves, or are employed, or employ others. In any case they can get nothing but that wage for their labor which free competition determines".

Tucker also believed that capitalist privileges violated workers right's to equal liberty, and for this reason they have complete right to strike for better conditions and higher wages. But under system of a free market without state monopolies and privileges, which he believed to, among others, prevent zero-interest loans from being accessible to the workers, the capitalists would have a right to suppress aggressive strikers.

first see to it that every law in violation of equal liberty is removed from the statute-books. If, after that, any laborers shall interfere with the rights of their employers or shall use force upon inoffensive “scabs,” or... attack their employers’ watchmen... I will be among the first to volunteer as a member of a force to repress these disturbers of order... But while these invasive laws remain, I must view every forcible conflict that arises as the consequence of an original violation of liberty on the part of the employing classes, and, if any sweeping is done, may the laborers hold the broom!

Tucker rejected the legislative programs of labor unions, laws imposing a short day, minimum wage laws, forcing businesses to provide insurance to employees and compulsory pension systems. At the same time, he held a genuine appreciation for labor unions (which he called trades-union socialism) and saw it as "an intelligent and self-governing socialism", and praised their "substitution of industrial socialism for usurping legislative mobism".

According to Tucker "Every one’s self-interest, and particularly the equal liberty of all, demands a distribution of property in which every one is guaranteed the product of his labor" and "the laborers, instead of having only a small fraction of the wealth in the world, should have all the wealth".

=== Money ===
Tucker was a supporter of deregulation of credit, and mutual banking, and believed that elimination of legal monopoly of the use of credit would reduce interest to zero.

=== Later embrace of egoism ===
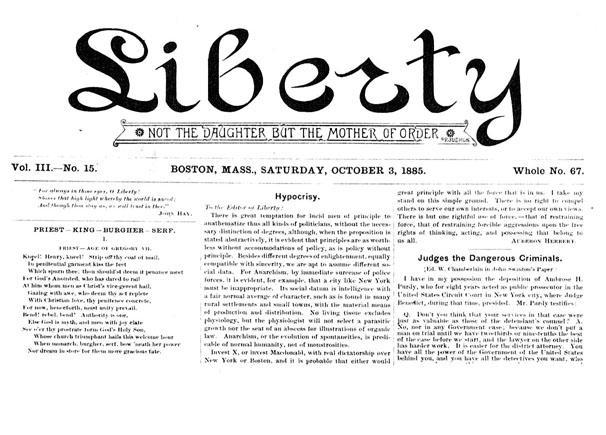
The anarchist periodical Liberty published by Tucker reflected the latter embrace of egoist anarchism in the 1880s, causing a conflict between egoists like Tucker and Spoonerian natural lawyers

Tucker came to hold the position that no rights exist until they are created by contract. This led him to controversial positions such as claiming that infants had no rights and were the property of their parents because they did not have the ability to contract. He said that a person, who physically tries to stop a mother from throwing her "baby into the fire", should be punished for violating her property rights. For example, he said that children would shed their status as property when they became old enough to contract "to buy or sell a house", noting that the precocity varies by age and would be determined by a jury in the case of a complaint.

== Criticisms ==
Anarcho-communist Albert Meltzer has criticized Tucker's school of individualist anarchism as not anarchism, reasoning that the private police which those individualists support "to break strikes so as to guarantee the employer's 'freedom' " constitutes a government. Sidney E. Parker, then still an individualist anarchist, harshly derided Meltzer as being mentally obtuse and denounced Meltzer's accusation as "malicious". Parker argued that Meltzer misconstrued Tucker, who declared his willingness to repress and kill aggressive striking workers only in a hypothetical scenario after authoritarian laws had been abolished; yet as long as such laws remain, Tucker would support the workers' actions.

Iain McKay et al. criticize specifically Tucker's support, even within an anarchy, for wage labour, which they consider hierarchical, exploitative, and conducive to private defense agencies' statism.

== See also ==
- Market anarchism
- Market socialism
- Mutualism
- Individualist anarchism in the United States
