= Joshua K. Ingalls =

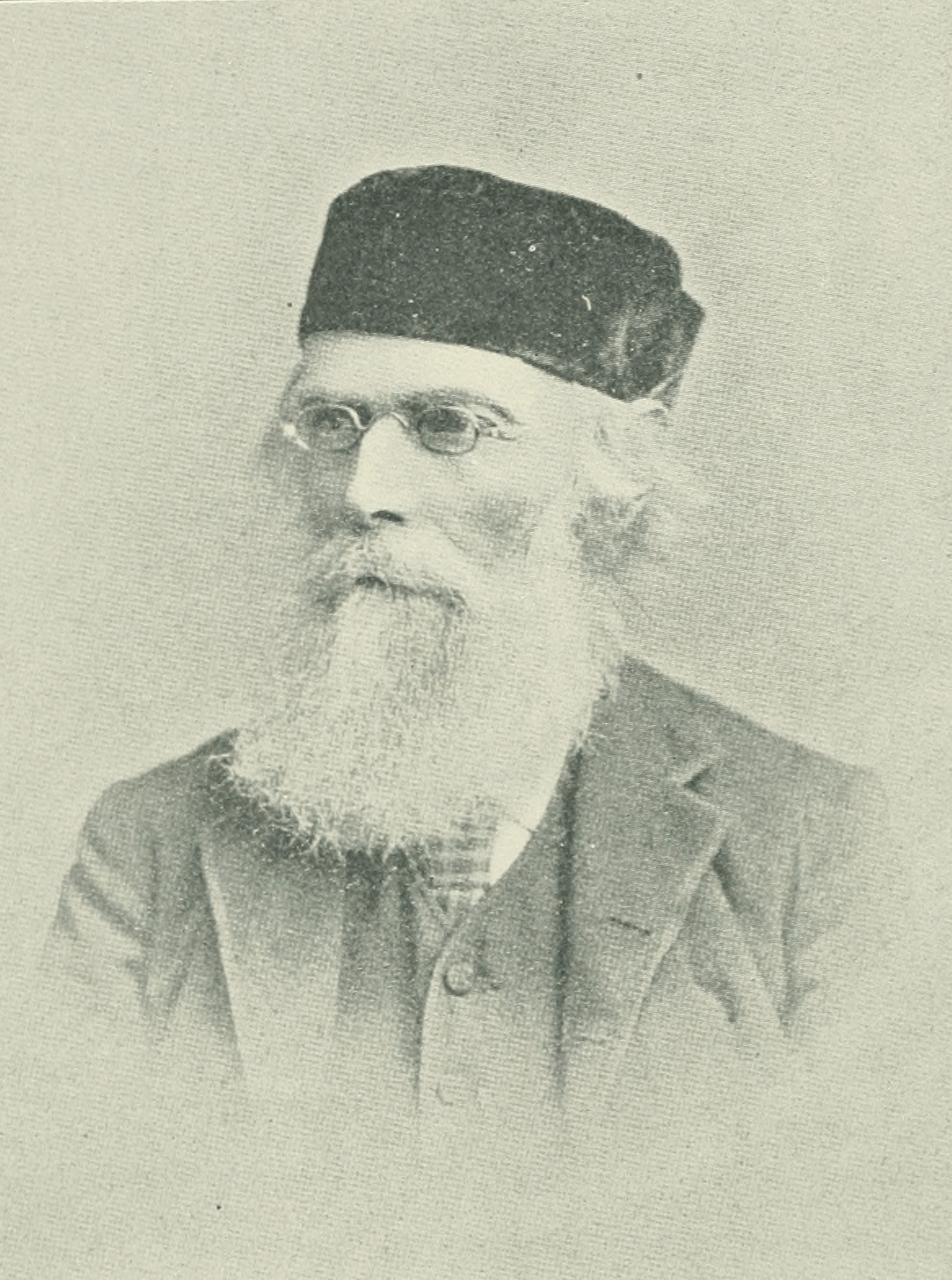
- Born: July 16, 1816; Swansea, Massachusetts, United States
- Died: March 3, 1899 (aged 82); Glenora, New York, United States
- Occupations: Inventor, Christian minister, writer, land reformer
- Spouse: Amanda Gray (m. 1837; died 1879)

Joshua King Ingalls (July 16, 1816 – Mar 3, 1899) was an American inventor, Christian minister, writer and land reformer who influenced contemporary individualist anarchists, despite never self-identifying as one.

== Biography ==
Ingalls was born in Swansea, Massachusetts, on July 16, 1816. He married Amanda Gray (1819–1879) on October 29, 1837; they had four children.

Ingalls was an associate of Benjamin Tucker and the Boston anarchists. He believed that government protection of idle land was the foundational source of all limitations on individual liberty. This was in disagreement with Tucker who, while also opposing protection of idle land, believed that government protection of the "banking monopoly" was the greatest evil. Like the individualist anarchists of the United States, Ingalls believed in a form of free-market socialism where "Every man will be rewarded according to his work" and each person was to receive the "whole product of his labor." And even denounced capitalism in his critique of land monopoly. Ingalls first learned of the mutualism of Proudhon through Charles A. Dana's articles titled "European Socialism". His three main influences were Pierre-Joseph Proudhon, Josiah Warren, and Stephen Pearl Andrews.

Ingalls died at home in Glenora, New York, on Mar 3, 1899.

== Works ==
- Economic Equities: A Compend of the Natural Laws of Industrial Production (1887)
- Reminiscences of an Octogenarian in the Fields of Industrial and Social Reform. Elmira, New York: Gazette Company, 1897
