= Mutual bank =

Cooperative financial institution

A mutual bank is a cooperative financial institution owned by its depositors or customers. They include mutual organization, mutual savings banks and cooperative banking. Unlike traditional banks, which prioritize shareholder profits, mutual banks focus on serving their members' interests. They reinvest profits back into the institution to benefit customers, offer a range of banking services, and often have a community-oriented approach. Regulations around mutual banking vary by country.

== See also ==
- Mutualism (economic theory)
- Building society
- Cooperative banking
- Credit union
