= Free association of producers =

Political concept

Free association, also known as free association of producers, is a relationship among individuals where there is no private ownership of the means of production. A key feature of socialist economics, it has been defined differently by different schools of socialism, entailing either the individual, collective or common ownership of the means of production.

== Socialist theory ==
The free association of producers is a defining characteristic of socialism. It entails the abolition of private ownership of the means of production and its transfer to the ownership of workers, either as individuals or as self-managed collectives. Social equality, cooperation and workers' self-management are the main conditions required for the development of a free association of producers. Under free association, workers themselves determine what to produce, as well as why, how and for whom they will produce it.

The French socialist Pierre-Joseph Proudhon defined socialism as a free association of producers and smallholders. Proudhon argued for the abolition of capitalism, under which private ownership of the means of production had imposed "wage slavery" on artisans and farmers. He believed that socialism would end the capitalist monopoly over the means of production and thereby allow both free competition and cooperation to flourish.

In contrast, the German communist Karl Marx defined socialism as the abolition of all private property, rather than a redistribution of it as proposed by Proudhon. Marx considered the free association to entail the means of production being held in common and the abolition of profit, rather than association between competing small property owners, and opposed Proudhon's ideas on competition as antithetical to socialism.

The Russian anarchist Mikhail Bakunin also considered a free association of producers to entail the abolition of private property, and instead advocated that the means of production be brought under common ownership. He also called for the abolition of the state and the construction of free association from the bottom-up.

== See also ==
- Cooperative
- Economic freedom
- Freedom of association
- Self-governance
- Workplace democracy

== Bibliography ==
- Carchedi, Guglielmo (2005). "On the production of knowledge". The Capitalist State and Its Economy: Democracy in Socialism. Emerald Group Publishing Limited. pp. 261–298. ISBN 978-0-76231-176-7.
- Chattopadhyay, Paresh (2018). "Anarchist Communism". Socialism and Commodity Production. Leiden: Brill. pp. 169–185. doi:10.1163/9789004377516_008. ISBN 978-9004377516.
- Deutscher, Isaac (1952). "Socialist Competition". Foreign Affairs. 30 (3): 376–390. doi:10.2307/20030907. ISSN 0015-7120. JSTOR 20030907.
- Tarrit, Fabien (2024). "Marx, Socialism and Liberty". Liberalism and Socialism since the Nineteenth Century: Tensions, Exchanges, and Convergences. Springer International Publishing. pp. 79–97. doi:10.1007/978-3-031-41233-2_5. ISBN 978-3-031-41233-2.
