= Voltairine de Cleyre bibliography =

List of works by Voltairine de Cleyre

This is a list of works by Voltairine de Cleyre (1866–1912).

== Essays ==
- "The Fine Arts" (Sarnia, 1883)
- "Secular Education" (The Truth Seeker, December 3, 1887)
- "The Drama of the Nineteenth Century" (Pittsburgh, December 16, 1888)
- "The Economic Tendency of Freethought" (Liberty, February 15, 1890)
- "Resistance" (The Individualist, August 26, 1890)
- "Dyer D. Lum" (Freedom, June 1893)
- "In Defense of Emma Goldman and the Right of Expropriation" (New York, December 16, 1893)
- "The Political Equality of Women" (The Conservator, July 1894)
- "Sex Slavery" (Philadelphia, 1895)
- "The Past and Future of the Ladies' Liberal League" (The Rebel, January 1896)
- "The Case of Woman Versus Orthodoxy" (Boston Investigator, 1896)
- "The Gateway to Freedom" (Free Society, March 24, 1901)
- "The Death of Love" (Lucifer, September 21, 1901)
- "Anarchism" (Free Society, October 13, 1901)
- "The Eleventh of November, 1887" (Free Society, November 24, 1901)
- "A Rocket of Iron" (Free Society, January 5, 1902)
- "The Hopelessly Fallen" (Lucifer, June 5, 1902)
- "Appeal for Herman Helcher" (Free Society, January 11, 1903)
- "Crime and Punishment" (Philadelphia, March 5, 1903)
- "Facts and Theories" (Free Society, March 8, 1903)
- "The Making of an Anarchist" (The Independent, September 24, 1903)
- "Anarchism in Literature" (Chicago, 1906)
- "Events are the True Schoolmaster" (1906)
- "An Open Letter" (Mother Earth, September 1906)
- "McKinley's Assassination: From the Anarchist Standpoint" (Mother Earth, October 1907)
- "A Correction" (Mother Earth, November 1907)
- "Those Who Marry Do Ill" (Mother Earth, January 1908)
- "Why I am an Anarchist" (Mother Earth, March 1908)
- "Our Present Attitude" (Mother Earth, April 1908)
- "Anarchism and American Traditions" (Mother Earth, December 1908)
- "On Liberty" (Mother Earth, July 1909)
- "The Free Speech Fight in Philadelphia" (Mother Earth, October 1909)
- "Our Censorship" (Mother Earth, November 1909)
- "The Dominant Idea" (Mother Earth, May 1910)
- "Modern Educational Reform" (New York, October 1910)
- "Literature, the Mirror of Man" (New York, October 7, 1910)
- "Francisco Ferrer" (Mother Earth, 1911)
- "Chicago Workers Show Sympathy" (Regeneración, July 1, 1911)
- "The Mexican Revolt" (Mother Earth, August 1911)
- "Direct Action" (Mother Earth, January 1912)
- "Report of the Work of the Chicago Mexican Defense League" (Mother Earth, April 1912)
- "The Heart of Angiolillo" (Mother Earth, 1912)
- "The Woman Question" (Herald of Revolt, September 1913)

== Poetry ==
- "My Wish" (c. 1873)
- "The School Over the Way" (c. 1876)
- "The Great Hereafter" (Sarnia, c. 1881)
- "The Burial of My Past Self" (1885)
- "The Christian's Faith" (1887)
- "The Freethinker's Plea" (1887)
- "And Thou Too" (St. Johns, Michigan, 1888)
- "To My Mother" (1889)
- "Night at the Grave in Waldheim" (Pittsburgh, 1889)
- "The Hurricane" (Sea Isle City, New Jersey, August 1889)
- "Ut Sementem Feceris, Ita Metes" (Philadelphia, February 1890)
- "Bastard Born" (Enterprise, Kansas, January 1891)
- "The Dirge of the Sea" (April 1891)
- "I Am" (January 1892)
- "Love's Ghost" (March 1892)
- "Life or Death" (Philadelphia, May 1892)
- "The Toast of Despair" (Philadelphia, 1892)
- "You and I" (1892)
- "Mary Wollstonecraft" (Philadelphia, April 27, 1893)
- "John P. Altgeld" (Philadelphia, June 1893)
- "In Memoriam" (Philadelphia, May 1894)
- "The Feast of Vultures" (Philadelphia, August 1894)
- "The Suicide's Defense" (Philadelphia, September 1894)
- "The Wandering Jew" (1894)
- "The Gods and the People" (London, 1897)
- "Light Upon Waldehim" (London, October 1897)
- "Germinal (The last word of Angiolillo)" (London, October 1897)
- "Santa Agueda" (Philadelphia, August 1898)
- "The Road Builders" (Philadelphia, July 24, 1900)
- "The Worm Turns" (Philadelphia, 1900)
- "Ave et Vale" (Philadelphia, January 1, 1901)
- "Marsh-Bloom (To Gaetano Bresci)" (Philadelphia, July 1901)
- "The Chain Gang" (1907)
- "Written-in-Red (To Our Living Dead in Mexico's Struggle)" (Regeneración, December 16, 1911)
- "The Commune is Risen" (Mother Earth, March 1912)

== Bibliography ==
- Avrich, Paul (1978). An American Anarchist: The Life of Voltairine de Cleyre. Princeton: Princeton University Press. ISBN 978-0-691-04657-0.
- Brigati, A. J. (2004). "Introduction". In Brigati, A. J. (ed.). The Voltairine De Cleyre Reader. Oakland, California: AK Press. pp. vii–x. ISBN 978-1-902593-87-6.
- Campbell, Michelle M. (2013). "Voltairine de Cleyre and the Anarchist Canon". Anarchist Developments in Cultural Studies. 1: 64–81. ISSN 1923-5615.
- DeLamotte, Eugenia (2004). Gates of Freedom: Voltairine de Cleyre and the Revolution of the Mind. University of Michigan Press. doi:10.3998/mpub.11482. ISBN 0-472-09867-5. JSTOR 10.3998/mpub.11482. LCCN 2004006183.
- Presley, Sharon (2005a). "The Exquisite Rebel: The Anarchist Life of Voltairine de Cleyre". In Presley, Sharon; Sartwell, Crispin (eds.). Exquisite Rebel: The Essays of Voltairine De Cleyre – Anarchist, Feminist, Genius. Albany: State University of New York Press. pp. 17–26. ISBN 978-0-7914-6094-8.
- Presley, Sharon (2005b). "Emma Goldman's 'Voltairine de Cleyre': A Moving but Flawed Tribute". In Presley, Sharon; Sartwell, Crispin (eds.). Exquisite Rebel: The Essays of Voltairine De Cleyre – Anarchist, Feminist, Genius. Albany: State University of New York Press. pp. 27–28. ISBN 978-0-7914-6094-8.
- Presley, Sharon (2005c). "Loving Freedom: Anarchism without Adjectives". In Presley, Sharon; Sartwell, Crispin (eds.). Exquisite Rebel: The Essays of Voltairine De Cleyre – Anarchist, Feminist, Genius. Albany: State University of New York Press. pp. 47–50. ISBN 978-0-7914-6094-8.
- Presley, Sharon (2005d). "Wild Freedom: A Passion for Liberty and Justice". In Presley, Sharon; Sartwell, Crispin (eds.). Exquisite Rebel: The Essays of Voltairine De Cleyre – Anarchist, Feminist, Genius. Albany: State University of New York Press. pp. 109–110. ISBN 978-0-7914-6094-8.
- Presley, Sharon (2005e). "Neither Gods nor Superstitions: Freethought and Religion". In Presley, Sharon; Sartwell, Crispin (eds.). Exquisite Rebel: The Essays of Voltairine De Cleyre – Anarchist, Feminist, Genius. Albany: State University of New York Press. pp. 161–164. ISBN 978-0-7914-6094-8.
- Presley, Sharon (2005f). "No Authority but Oneself: The Anarchist Feminist Philosophy of Autonomy and Freedom". In Presley, Sharon; Sartwell, Crispin (eds.). Exquisite Rebel: The Essays of Voltairine De Cleyre – Anarchist, Feminist, Genius. Albany: State University of New York Press. pp. 191–194. ISBN 978-0-7914-6094-8.
- Sartwell, Crispin; Presley, Sharon (2005). "Not Another Brick in the Wall: Nonauthoritarian Education". In Presley, Sharon; Sartwell, Crispin (eds.). Exquisite Rebel: The Essays of Voltairine De Cleyre – Anarchist, Feminist, Genius. Albany: State University of New York Press. pp. 247–250. ISBN 978-0-7914-6094-8.
- Sartwell, Crispin (2005a). "Priestess of Pity and Vengeance". In Presley, Sharon; Sartwell, Crispin (eds.). Exquisite Rebel: The Essays of Voltairine De Cleyre – Anarchist, Feminist, Genius. Albany: State University of New York Press. pp. 3–16. ISBN 978-0-7914-6094-8.
- Sartwell, Crispin (2005b). "Breaking the Chains: Changing Society through Direct Action". In Presley, Sharon; Sartwell, Crispin (eds.). Exquisite Rebel: The Essays of Voltairine De Cleyre – Anarchist, Feminist, Genius. Albany: State University of New York Press. pp. 269–270. ISBN 978-0-7914-6094-8.
- Sartwell, Crispin (2005c). "The Political Is the Personal: Anarchist Esthetics". In Presley, Sharon; Sartwell, Crispin (eds.). Exquisite Rebel: The Essays of Voltairine De Cleyre – Anarchist, Feminist, Genius. Albany: State University of New York Press. pp. 307–308. ISBN 978-0-7914-6094-8.
