= Samuel H. Gordon =

Russian–American physician and anarchist (1871–1906)

Samuel Gordon
- שמואל גארדאן
- Born: 1871; Russian Empire
- Died: November 10, 1906 (aged 34–35); Newark, New Jersey, U.S.
- Education: Medico-Chirurgical College of Philadelphia
- Occupation: Physician
- Movement: Anarchism
- Partner: Voltairine de Cleyre (1893–1900)

Samuel H. Gordon (1871–1906) was a Russian-American physician. Having emigrated to the United States in the early 1890s, he joined the Jewish anarchist movement in Philadelphia and began taking lessons in the English language from Voltairine de Cleyre. Before long, he was engaged in a romantic relationship with her and participated in her anarchist activism, but their relationship quickly became strained after she rejected his marriage proposal. de Cleyre herself paid his way through medical school and he graduated as a Doctor of Medicine in 1898, after which he left the anarchist movement and broke up with de Cleyre. When de Cleyre was hospitalized by an assassination attempt in 1902, he refused to help her, which ostracized him further from the anarchist movement. Gordon died from gastritis in 1906.

== Biography ==
Samuel H. Gordon was born in 1871, into a Jewish family in the Russian Empire. After reaching adulthood, he emigrated to the United States and settled in Philadelphia. He quickly became involved in the local labor movement, for which he was arrested during a strike action in August 1890. Having found work as a cigar maker, he joined a Jewish anarchist group, the Knights of Liberty, and became a disciple of the German anarchist theorist Johann Most.

In 1893, Gordon approached the American anarchist Voltairine de Cleyre and asked her to teach him the English language. Gordon was one of de Cleyre's few Jewish students who achieved a good enough comprehension of the English language to publish their work in the American anarchist press. They were also physically attracted to each other and quickly became lovers, moving in together and working together on their anarchist propaganda work. De Cleyre referred to him affectionately as "Pussy mine". By the following year, Gordon's English comprehension was good enough that he gave a lecture about revolution at a meeting of de Cleyre's organization, the Ladies' Liberal League (LLL). Through the LLL, Gordon participated in de Cleyre's defense campaign, which secured the release of the English anarchist Charles Mowbray from jail. Gordon was unpopular among the other Philadelphia anarchists, who thought him shallow and unintelligent. He founded a short-lived Jewish anarchist group, New Generation, as a splinter of the Knights of Liberty.

In the mid-1890s, Gordon enrolled in medical school, at the Medico-Chirurgical College of Philadelphia. His education was paid for by de Cleyre, despite her own meager income; she recalled that "I gave Mother and Gordon over $1,000 between them, yet they consider me 'impractical'". By this time, he had begun to neglect de Cleyre. To de Cleyre, he seemed increasingly "irresponsible and self-indulgent", and apparently loved her less than she loved him. He also disliked her pet cats, even forcing her to lock one in a coal bin, which resulted in it fleeing the house. Over time, their relationship was increasingly marked by bitter arguments, with one escalating to such an extent that they both attempted to commit suicide by poisoning themselves. Gordon was treated by a doctor and survived the ordeal, but it caused severe burns to his lips and stomach. According to de Cleyre, the argument had been caused after she rejected Gordon's marriage proposal. In 1897, while she was in London, she wrote to him offering to mend their relationship, on certain conditions:

If you want me back I shall come all the sooner if you treat me as a free woman and not as a slave. [...] Last summer I wanted to enslave you—at least so much that my days and nights were tears because you preferred other people to me, though theoretically I know I was wrong. I will never, never live that life again. It is not worth while living at that price. I would rather die here in England and never see your beautiful face again than live to be the slave of my own affection for you. I will never, let come what will, accept the condition of married slavery again. I will not do things for you; I will not live with you, for if I do I suffer the tortures of owning and being owned.

Gordon also caused a feud to break out between de Cleyre and Emma Goldman. De Cleyre wanted Gordon to accompany her while she visited Goldman in prison, despite Gordon having supported Johann Most's condemnation of Goldman's friend Alexander Berkman, after he had attempted to assassinate Henry Clay Frick. Gordon himself had also publicly denounced Goldman as a "disruptor of the movement" and refused to participate in any meeting where she was present. Goldman consequently rejected de Cleyre's request, and the two quickly fell out with each other. According to Goldman, "Voltairine could never forgive me [for] my dislike of that dog Gordon who sapped her dry and then cast her away."

Gordon graduated as a Doctor of Medicine in 1898, and established his medical practice at 531 Pine Street. As he achieved material success as a physician, he left the anarchist movement and, by the turn of the century, he had split up with de Cleyre. De Cleyre herself remarked to her sister, Adelaide D. Thayer, that: "I'm just the same friends with Gordon I always was, but he isn’t satisfied with me because I won’t agree to the regular program of married life (I don’t mean the ceremony but the rest of it—exclusive possession, home, children, all that) so we don’t see each other very often." When recalling her relationship with Gordon, de Cleyre said that "every woman contemplating sexual union of any kind" should not "live together with the man you love, in the sense of renting a house or rooms, and becoming his housekeeper."

One of de Cleyre's students, Herman Helcher, became obsessed with her and Gordon, and was distressed after they broke up. He attempted to get them to reconcile, but failing to achieve success, instead attempted to assassinate de Cleyre. Hospitalised by the attack, her doctor Hillel Solotaroff went to Philadelphia to speak with Gordon and solicit his help in treating her, but he refused to help. This provoked fierce condemnation from the anarchist movement. Emma Goldman remarked that "[de Cleyre] had drudged for years to help him through college, and now that she was ill, he had not even a kind word for her. My intuition about him had been correct." Regarding the motivations for his refusal, historian Robert P. Helms speculated whether other anarchist physicians in Philadelphia had effectively blacklisted his practice. After some years, Gordon finally went to visit her, but she no longer recognized him. When he pointed to a picture of himself on her wall and asked if she knew him, she responded "Yes, but he was a different person then." De Cleyre would remain in severe pain until she died.

In 1904, he moved to Newark, New Jersey. There he fell ill with gastritis, possibly caused by arsenic poisoning as a result of the treatment of his syphilis, which he had contracted from de Cleyre. Samuel H. Gordon died on November 10, 1906. He is largely remembered because of his relationship with de Cleyre.

== Selected works ==
- Revolution: Its Necessity and Its Justification (1894, Knights of Labor) OCLC 1032291463

== Bibliography ==
- Avrich, Paul (1978). An American Anarchist: The Life of Voltairine de Cleyre. Princeton: Princeton University Press. ISBN 978-0-691-04657-0.
- DeLamotte, Eugenia (2004). Gates of Freedom: Voltairine de Cleyre and the Revolution of the Mind. University of Michigan Press. doi:10.3998/mpub.11482. ISBN 0-472-09867-5. JSTOR 10.3998/mpub.11482. LCCN 2004006183.
- Helms, Robert P. (2006a). "Doctors and Druggists Among the Early Philadelphia Anarchists". Dead Anarchists.
- Helms, Robert P. (2006b). "Voltairine de Cleyre on Domesticity, Jealousy, and Abortion". Dead Anarchists.
- Sartwell, Crispin (2005). "Priestess of Pity and Vengeance". In Sharon, Presley; Sartwell, Crispin (eds.). Exquisite Rebel: The Essays of Voltairine De Cleyre – Anarchist, Feminist, Genius. Albany: State University of New York Press. pp. 3–16. ISBN 978-0-7914-6094-8.
- Weinberg, Chaim Leib (2008). Helms, Robert P. (ed.). Forty Years in the Struggle: The Memoirs of a Jewish Anarchist. Translated by Cohen, Naomi. Duluth: Litwin Books. ISBN 978-0-9802004-3-0.
