= Herman Helcher =

Attempted murderer (1877–1912)

- הערמאן העלטשער
- Born: Chaim Helcher; 1877; Daugavpils, Vitebsk, Russian Empire (today Latvia)
- Died: 4 November 1912 (aged 34–35); Philadelphia, Pennsylvania, United States
- Resting place: Har Nebo Cemetery
- Movement: Anarchism
- Motive: Unrequited love, paranoia
- Conviction: Attempted murder

Details
- Injured: Voltairine de Cleyre
- Weapon: Revolver

Chaim "Herman" Helcher (1877–1912) was a Latvian-American cigar maker and attempted murderer. Having suffered from a mental disorder since childhood, after emigrating to the United States, he became obsessed with his English teacher Voltairine de Cleyre. He began to harbor paranoid delusions about her, leading to him attempting to murder her. De Cleyre survived the attack, but the bullet wounds caused her pain for the rest of her life. Although she defended Helcher during his trial, he was convicted and sentenced to prison. He spent much of the remainder in his life in mental asylums, where he died.

== Biography ==
Chaim "Herman" Helcher was born into a Latvian Jewish family, in the city of Daugavpils, in the Russian Empire. In 1888, he emigrated to the United States, together with his mother and sister. From a young age, he showed signs of paranoia, caused by the accumulation of uric acid in his blood. By 1895, this condition had caused a brain fever, which developed into a mental disorder.

He settled in Philadelphia, where he found work as a cigar maker, joined the local anarchist movement, and began receiving lessons in the English language from the American anarchist Voltairine de Cleyre. Helcher was known in Philadelphia for having a "mild" and "gentle" character. Fellow anarchist Nathan Navro described him as "a little foolish, but very sincere in his anarchism". But he also exhibited strange behavior; on one occasion he requested the home address of John Wanamaker so that he could break into his house and steal a lock of his daughter's hair.

Helcher soon became obsessed with his teacher and her partner Samuel H. Gordon. When the couple broke up, he attempted to get them back together "for the good of the cause". But when de Cleyre rebuffed him, he began to turn against her and started to exhibit paranoid delusions about her. He accused de Cleyre of antisemitism, believed that she had blacklisted him from her local anarchist group and had gotten him fired; in the latter case, he had not actually been dismissed and still had his job. He also held an unrequited love for de Cleyre, which caused him great distress, although he never expressed his feelings to her. By October 1902, he had decided to murder his former teacher.

Helcher purchased a revolver and a fake moustache. One day, he attempted to ambush her on her way to one of her lessons, but called off the attack when he saw that she was walking with Mary Hansen. On December 19, 1902, Helcher accosted de Cleyre while she was waiting alone for a trolley car, at the corner of 4th Street and Green Street. He pulled on her sleeve and when she turned to face him, he shot her at point blank in the chest. As she twisted away from him, he shot at her three more times, with two of the bullets hitting her in the back. She managed to run away down the block before collapsing, after which she was rushed to a hospital.

Helcher himself remained in place where he had attacked de Cleyre and was arrested without resistance. He told the police that arrested him "I don't want to live. We were sweethearts. She broke my heart and deserved to be killed." That same day, Hansen visited him at the police station where he was held and asked him why he had tried to kill de Cleyre. He responded: "I don't know; I had to." Hansen asked why he had never came to tell them of his grievance and said that de Cleyre herself wasn't even aware that he was still in Philadelphia. He asked back: "Well, why didn't she know? She ought to have known. Nobody cared about me. I had nothing to eat for three days, and fourteen cents in my pocket."

When the police brought him to de Cleyre's hospital bed to identify him, she refused to identify him as her attacker. Due to his mental condition, de Cleyre believed that he needed professional care, rather than carceral punishment. She also refused to appear as a witness in his trial, organized a campaign to secure his release from jail and collected funds for his defense. Despite her appeals, Helcher stood trial and was found guilty of attempted murder. Although sentenced to 6 years and 9 months imprisonment, he was soon transferred to a mental asylum in Norristown, Pennsylvania and later released into his parents' protective custody. His condition only got worse and he was recommitted to the asylum, where he died. Helcher's bullets, which were never removed from de Cleyre's body, continued to cause her pain for the rest of her life.

== Bibliography ==
- Avrich, Paul (1978). An American Anarchist: The Life of Voltairine de Cleyre. Princeton: Princeton University Press. ISBN 978-0-691-04657-0.
- Brigati, A. J. (2004). "Introduction". In Brigati, A. J. (ed.). The Voltairine De Cleyre Reader. Oakland, California: AK Press. pp. vii–x. ISBN 978-1-902593-87-6.
- DeLamotte, Eugenia (2004). Gates of Freedom: Voltairine de Cleyre and the Revolution of the Mind. University of Michigan Press. doi:10.3998/mpub.11482. ISBN 0-472-09867-5. JSTOR 10.3998/mpub.11482. LCCN 2004006183.
- Gaarder, Emily (2009). "Addressing violence against women: Alternatives to state-based law and punishment". Contemporary anarchist studies. Routledge. pp. 62–72. ISBN 9780203891735.
- Helms, Robert P. (November 18, 2016). "Ida Celanire Craddock & Voltairine de Cleyre: Two Freethinkers of Philadelphia". Dead Anarchists.
- Sartwell, Crispin (2005). "Priestess of Pity and Vengeance". In Sharon, Presley; Sartwell, Crispin (eds.). Exquisite Rebel: The Essays of Voltairine De Cleyre – Anarchist, Feminist, Genius. Albany: State University of New York Press. pp. 3–16. ISBN 978-0-7914-6094-8.
- Shone, Steve J. (2013). "Voltairine de Cleyre: More of an Anarchist than a Feminist?". American Anarchism. Leiden: Brill. pp. 38–59. doi:10.1163/9789004251953_004. ISBN 9789004251953.
