= Mary Hansen (anarchist) =

Danish-American schoolteacher and activist (1874–1952)

- Born: 1874; Denmark
- Died: 1952 (aged 77–78); Stelton, New Jersey, United States
- Occupation: Schoolteacher
- Movement: Anarchism in the United States, Ferrer movement
- Spouse: George Brown
- Children: Heloise Hansen-Brown (b. 1904)

Mary Hansen (1874–1952) was a Danish-American schoolteacher and anarchist activist.

== Biography ==
Mary Hansen was born in Denmark, before emigrating to the United States and settling in Philadelphia. She met the American anarchist George Brown in Fairmount Park, where they bonded over their mutual love of literature. They became lovers, lived and ate together and eventually had two children. Their families disapproved of their common-law marriage, which had not been confirmed by either the state of the church. The couple endeavoured to educate and raise their children outside of the influence of either religion or legal institutions. As a member of the Philadelphia anarchist movement, Hansen spent her Sundays distributing anarchist literature and often attended radical lectures.

Hansen also became best friends with the American anarchist writer Voltairine de Cleyre. Hansen and Brown frequently shared dinners with de Cleyre, with whom they read and discussed literature. In 1894, Hansen and Brown provided de Cleyre with a room at their home. de Cleyre compared Hansen to a saint and her sister Adelaide De Claire described her as a good friend to de Cleyre. As de Cleyre's health deteriorated due to overwork, Hansen wondered how she had "ill strong enough to force that frail body forward".

In the autumn of 1900, Hansen, Brown and de Cleyre together established the Social Science Club, which sponsored lectures and organized reading circles to discuss anarchist literature. By the following year, it had become the foremost anarchist group in Philadelphia. de Cleyre again moved in with Hansen and Brown in 1901. de Cleyre was still living with Hansen in December 1902, when one of her students, Herman Helcher, attempted to murder de Cleyre. He had called off one of his attempts after he saw Hansen with de Cleyre, but shot her a few days later once he saw her alone. After the shooting, Mary Hansen confronted Helcher at the police station, asking why he wanted to shoot de Cleyre. When responded that he felt he had to, Hansen asked why he did not tell them about how he was feeling, to which he declared that nobody cared about him and that he was so financially destitute that he had eaten nothing for three days.

In May 1903, Hansen, Brown and de Cleyre organized open air meetings to support a textile workers' strike in Germantown. In March 1906, Hansen and Brown began contributing to Emma Goldman's new anarchist magazine Mother Earth. Following the Broad Street Riot of February 1908, Hansen and Brown participated in a defense committee, which had been established by de Cleyre to raise funds for and organize the legal defense of activists who had been prosecuted for the riot. When de Cleyre returned to Michigan, where she had grown up, in June 1909, she wrote to Hansen about the severe urban decay that had happened in the towns of her childhood. In December 1909, de Cleyre told Hansen of how her depression had grown worse during her time there.

In October 1910, Hansen participated in the founding of the Modern Sunday School, a Ferrer movement school hosted by the Philadelphia Radical Library. Located on 424 Pine Street, in the Jewish quarter of West Philadelphia, Hansen taught at the school and her daughter Heloise Hansen-Brown (b. 1904) was reportedly one of its best students. At the school, Hansen gained a reputation as a skilled poet and storyteller. According to the educator Alexis Ferm, she was also known for her amicable personality: "She had no mean qualities, no jealousies and so far as I could tell no hatreds. If the majority of people had her state of mind, there would be no wars, no jostling for position, no 'grab while the grabbing is good'".

During the early 1910s, Hansen moved to the single tax community in Arden, Delaware, where she shared a cottage with Brown. Hansen was occasionally visited there by de Cleyre. de Cleyre told Hansen about her desire for a peaceful and quiet place to live, even finding herself yearning to return to an orderly life on a convent. de Cleyre also told her about the ongoing Mexican Revolution, which she described as a "genuine economic revolt, with the red flag for its standard". Following de Cleyre's death, in July 1912, Hansen contributed an article about her to a memorial issue of Mother Earth. de Cleyre's letters to Hansen were collected in the Joseph Ishill Collection in Harvard University. During her remaining years at Stelton, Hansen spoke frequently and lovingly of de Cleyre.

In June 1916, Hansen was elected to the board of directors of the Modern School Association of North America. After her husband died, Hansen remained a member of the anarchist movement and developed her own work as a poet. In 1952, Mary Hansen died in her home in Stelton, New Jersey.

== Selected works ==
- A Catechism of Anarchy (Social Science Club; 1902)
- "Social Organism Again" (Free Society; February 1902)
- "Our Purpose" (Mother Earth; April 1906)
- "A Vision of Sacrifice" (Freedom; November 1907)

== Bibliography ==
- Avrich, Paul (1978). An American Anarchist: The Life of Voltairine de Cleyre. Princeton: Princeton University Press. ISBN 978-0-691-04657-0.
- Avrich, Paul (1980). The Modern School Movement: Anarchism and Education in the United States. Princeton University Press. ISBN 0-691-04669-7.
- DeLamotte, Eugenia (2004). Gates of Freedom: Voltairine de Cleyre and the Revolution of the Mind. University of Michigan Press. doi:10.3998/mpub.11482. ISBN 0-472-09867-5. JSTOR 10.3998/mpub.11482. LCCN 2004006183.
- Palczewski, Catherine Helen (1995). "Voltairine de Cleyre: Sexual Slavery and Sexual Pleasure in the Nineteenth Century". NWSA Journal. 7 (3): 54–68. ISSN 2151-7363. JSTOR 4316402.
- Taylor, Mark (2002). "Utopia by Taxation: Frank Stephens and the Single Tax Community of Arden, Delaware". The Pennsylvania Magazine of History and Biography. 126 (2): 305–325. JSTOR 20093532.
- Weinberg, Chaim Leib (2008). Helms, Robert P. (ed.). Forty Years in the Struggle: The Memoirs of a Jewish Anarchist. Translated by Cohen, Naomi. Litwin Books. ISBN 978-0-9802004-3-0.
