= Annie Livshis =

American anarchist (1864–1953)

- אַני ליבשיס
- Born: Chana Mindlin; March 25, 1864; Vitebsk Governorate, Russian Empire (now Belarus)
- Died: April 1, 1953 (aged 89); Arvada, Colorado, United States
- Organization: Pioneers of Liberty
- Movement: Anarchism in the United States
- Spouse: Jacob Livshis (m. 1887; died 1925)
- Children: Peter Livshis
- Parents: Joshua Mindlin (father); Sarah Esther Mindlin (mother)
- Relatives: Chaim Mindlin (uncle)

Annie Mindlin Livshis (March 25, 1864 – April 1, 1953) was an American anarchist. Born into a Belarusian Jewish family, she left the Russian Empire and emigrated to the United States, where she joined the American anarchist movement. After some time in a Jewish colony in Kansas, she moved to Chicago, where she engaged in trade union organising and hosted anarchists at her house.

== Biography ==
=== Early life ===
Chana Mindlin was born on March 25, 1864, in an inn in the Vitebsk Governorate of the Russian Empire. She was the third of eight children and raised in an Orthodox Jewish family. As only her brothers were allowed to be educated, she was informally taught how to read by one of her brothers, but was not taught how to write. After the death of her mother and eldest brother, by the 1880s, the rest of the family sought to emigrate, as pogroms in the Russian Empire increasingly threatened their safety.

=== Settlement in America ===
Chana Mindlin, known by the anglicised name "Annie", arrived in New York City in April 1886. There she was introduced to anarchism by her brother Harris and his friend Israel Kopeloff, a follower of Johann Most, and she joined the Pioneers of Liberty, a Jewish anarchist organization. In New York, Mindlin went to work in a sweatshop, earning less than $6 (equivalent to $215 in 2025) for up to 80 hours of work per week. Unable to handle the stress of the job, she quit two months later and set off to the Midwestern United States.

On July 7, 1886, Mindlin handed in her resignation notice and set off for Kansas. There, her uncle Chaim Mindlin had established the Lasker Colony, a small Jewish colony named after the German liberal Eduard Lasker, on land seized from the Osage Nation. Her train went through miles of dusty farmland before arriving in Lasker, which she discovered had been filled with wildflowers by the Jewish colonists. On August 5, 1886, she registered as a homesteader with Ford County. She had her own house and planted 9 acres of corn with the help of her brothers. On November 7, 1887, she married Jacob Livshis, first in a ceremony performed by a justice of the peace, followed by a traditional Jewish wedding.

In 1888, Jacob and Annie Livshis moved to Chicago, where they got factory jobs in sweatshops. There the couple began organizing Jewish workers against the factories' exploitative working conditions, establishing a cloakmakers' trade union in 1890. That same year, they returned to their homestead on Lasker Colony, where they had two children: Peter (b. March 1894) and Annie (b. April 1897). Their son was born deaf and asthmatic and their daughter died while she was still young. By 1898, persistent drought had made farming impossible, so they left Lasker Colony and returned to Chicago.

=== Life in Chicago ===
In Chicago, the Livshis family founded the American anarchist movement at its strongest. They established an anarchist reading group, named after the Ukrainian Jewish anarchist David Edelstadt, whose Yiddish poetry inspired them. Their home in Wicker Park became a centre for anarchists in Chicago. There, Annie Livshis hosted prominent anarchist intellectuals such as Abraham Cahan, Emma Goldman, Sadakichi Hartmann, Rudolf Rocker and Michael Zametkin.

Livshis hosted members of her family and regularly received visits from her friends Lucy Parsons and Ben Reitman. She also opened their home to the anarchist writer Voltairine de Cleyre during the last years of her life, although she found living in the communal household difficult due to the constant activity. When de Cleyre died in 1912, Livshis organised her funeral in Walheim Cemetery. She also published a pamphlet, In Memoriam: Voltairine de Cleyre, to raise money for the collection and publication of her deceased friend's work.

During this period, she was also able to get her son an education, and found him a public elementary school with a program for deaf children. He later graduated from Tuley High School and attempted to further his education at the University of Chicago, but he was not able to keep up with the lectures. She cared for Peter and his wife Inez, who had met at a deaf club, and provided them with a home. After her husband's death in 1925, Livshis continued their anarchist activism. On her 80th birthday, she was praised by her son and the Russian anarchist Boris Yelensky, respectively for her devoted parenting and activism. In 1950, Livshis, her son and daughter-in-law moved to Arvada, Colorado. She died there, on April 1, 1953, at the age of 89.

== Bibliography ==
- Avrich, Paul (1978). An American Anarchist: The Life of Voltairine de Cleyre. Princeton: Princeton University Press. ISBN 978-0-691-04657-0.
- Conrad, Sarah; Herrada, Julie. "Annie and Jake Livshis Family Papers, Circa 1880s - 2000s". University of Michigan Library.
- Lewin Diament, Anna (2001). "Livshis, Anna Mindlin (Annie)". In Lunin Schultz, Rima; Hast, Adele (eds.). Women building Chicago 1790-1990: A biographical dictionary. Indiana University Press. pp. 514–517. ISBN 9780253338525.
