= Arlington, Illinois =

- Village
- Location of Arlington in Bureau County, Illinois

- Location in Illinois Arlington (the United States) Arlington (North America)
- Coordinates: 41°28′20″N 89°14′49″W
- Country: US
- State: Illinois
- County: Bureau
- Township: Westfield
- Settled: 1843
- Platted: 1853
- Founded by: James Waugh
- Named after: Arlington, New York

Government
  - Village president: Dick Koch

Area
  - Total: 0.39 sq mi (1.02 km^{2})
  - Land: 0.39 sq mi (1.02 km^{2})
  - Water: 0 sq mi (0.00 km^{2})
- Elevation: 738 ft (225 m)

Population (2020)
  - Total: 169
  - Estimate (2024): 165 ▼
  - Density: 427.5/sq mi (165.06/km^{2})
- Time zone: UTC-6 (CST)
  - Summer (DST): UTC-5 (CDT)
- ZIP code: 61312
- Area codes: 815 & 779
- FIPS code: 17-02102
- GNIS feature ID: 2397984

Arlington is a village in Westfield Township, Bureau County, Illinois, United States. The population was 169 at the 2020 census. It is part of the Ottawa Micropolitan Statistical Area, located east of the Quad Cities, north of Peoria and Galesburg, west of LaSalle and Peru, and southwest of Rockford and Chicago.

== History ==
Arlington was settled in 1843 and laid out in 1853 by James Waugh at the advent of the Chicago, Burlington, and Quincy Railroad through the area.

In the early 1900s, Arlington, which was then called "Lost Grove", was experiencing rapid growth and development. Many companies set up shop to profit from the people flocking to the jobs at the coal mines in this area of Illinois. The businesses included a mattress factory, beer brewery, numerous restaurants, a brothel, and many others. The mayor at the time was from New York, and changed the town's name to Arlington, after the town of Arlington, New York. Arlington was about the size of Peru, Illinois.

On November 13, 1909, a fire in a mine shaft killed 259 miners, young and old, at the Cherry coal mine. Authorities sealed the mine to contain the fire, trapping many rescue workers inside. When the mine was opened a week later, only twenty men had survived of the hundreds involved. The 1909 Cherry Mine disaster influenced early workers' compensation laws and labor practices in the coal mining industry. At the time, Illinois had no laws governing working conditions for miners. Arlington's growth slowed drastically after this occurrence.

In the 1950s a tornado destroyed most of Arlington. Many people moved away from the town at this time. Today, Arlington has a population of less than 200. Many of the businesses and most of the homes have been shut down, deserted, or demolished. Many areas previously inhabited are now corn and bean fields. Some of the abandoned homes' foundations, and evidence of their former occupants, are still visible in these fields.

== Geography ==
According to the 2021 census gazetteer files, Arlington has a total area of 0.40 square miles (1.04 km^{2}), all land.

== Demographics ==
Historical population
Census	Pop.	Note	%±
1880	447		—
1890	436		−2.5%
1900	400		−8.3%
1910	370		−7.5%
1920	284		−23.2%
1930	258		−9.2%
1940	258		0.0%
1950	247		−4.3%
1960	254		2.8%
1970	250		−1.6%
1980	236		−5.6%
1990	200		−15.3%
2000	211		5.5%
2010	193		−8.5%
2020	169		−12.4%
U.S. Decennial Census

As of the 2020 census there were 169 people, 76 households, and 61 families residing in the village. The population density was 427.85 inhabitants per square mile (165.19/km^{2}). There were 82 housing units at an average density of 207.59 per square mile (80.15/km^{2}). The racial makeup of the village was 94.67% White, 0.59% African American, 0.59% Asian, and 4.14% from two or more races. Hispanic or Latino people of any race were 1.18% of the population.

There were 76 households, out of which 27.6% had children under the age of 18 living with them, 68.42% were married couples living together, 11.84% had a female householder with no husband present, and 19.74% were non-families. 17.11% of all households were made up of individuals, and 6.58% had someone living alone who was 65 years of age or older. The average household size was 3.15 and the average family size was 2.78.

The village's age distribution consisted of 17.5% under the age of 18, 6.6% from 18 to 24, 23.2% from 25 to 44, 38.9% from 45 to 64, and 13.7% who were 65 years of age or older. The median age was 46.5 years. For every 100 females, there were 106.9 males. For every 100 females age 18 and over, there were 97.7 males.

The median income for a household in the village was $73,750, and the median income for a family was $83,750. Males had a median income of $41,250 versus $25,833 for females. The per capita income for the village was $28,693. About 9.8% of families and 7.6% of the population were below the poverty line, including 8.1% of those under age 18 and 0.0% of those age 65 or over.

== Notable people ==
- Mike Prendergast, major league baseball player
- Albert B. Wolfe, economist
