= Sada Bailey Fowler =

American feminist writer

- Writing career
- Years active: 1886–1900
- Period: 19th century
- Subjects: Free love, criticism of marriage
- Notable works: Irene, Or, The Road to Freedom
- Literary movement: Feminism

Sada Bailey Fowler (fl. 1886–1900) was an American feminist writer.

== Biography ==
Fowler was a Quaker and a spiritualist, from Philadelphia.

In 1886, Fowler published her feminist novel Irene, Or, The Road to Freedom, which argued for free love and the abolition of marriage. The novel caused a sensation and was widely discussed and debated, including in some of the biggest literary reviews in the United States. Parents in the freethinking movement even encouraged their children to read her book, in order to develop their views on egalitarian relationships.

Later that year, when the free love practitioner Lillian Harman was put on trial for violating marriage laws, Fowler publicly defended her, comparing Harman to an abolitionist. She described her as "one of the inspired women of our time" and upheld her declaration of free love as "one of the noblest declarations that a true woman can make". Fowler contributed copies of her novel Irene for resale, in order to fund Harman's defense campaign.

She also began writing for Harman's publication, Lucifer, the Light-Bearer, in which she elaborated her views on free love. She described Harman's father and editor-in-chief of Lucifer, Moses Harman, as the "William Lloyd Garrison of the age". She engaged in an exchange with other feminist contributors to the paper, in which they discussed what form an ideal marital union should take. In Lucifer, Fowler wrote that she had heard fewer complaints about sexual slavery from Quaker women than from women of any other religious denomination. She was helped in her writing by the anarchist-feminist Voltairine de Cleyre, who in 1900, she provided with lodging at her farmhouse in Torresdale.

== Selected works ==
Books

- Irene, Or, The Road to Freedom (1886)

Articles

- "An Open Letter to Lillian Harman" (Lucifer the Light Bearer, October 8, 1886)
- "'Happy New Year' to Noble Lucifer" (Lucifer the Light Bearer, December 17, 1886)
- "Sister Bailey to Sister Lake" Lucifer the Light Bearer, February 11, 1887)
- "Letter to the Editor" (Lucifer the Light Bearer, March 7, 1890)
- "Various Voices" (Lucifer the Light Bearer, November 20, 1896)

== Bibliography ==
- Avrich, Paul (1978). An American Anarchist: The Life of Voltairine de Cleyre. Princeton: Princeton University Press. ISBN 978-0-691-04657-0.
- Battan, J. F. (1999). "The "Rights" of Husbands and the "Duties" of Wives: Power and Desire in the American Bedroom, 1850-1910". Journal of Family History. 24 (2): 165–186. doi:10.1177/036319909902400203.
- Dawson, Oswald (1897). Personal Rights and Sexual Wrongs. Wm. Reeves.
- Passet, Joanne Ellen (2005a). "Freethought Children's Literature and the Construction of Religious Identity in Late-Nineteenth-Century America". Book History. 8: 107–129. doi:10.1353/bh.2005.0009.
- Reid, Charles J. (2011). "The Devil Comes to Kansas: A Story of Free Love and the Law". Legal Studies Research Paper (11–26). University of St. Thomas. doi:10.2139/ssrn.1932830. SSRN 1932830.
- Weingartner, Andrea M. (2013). Sex radicals in America's heartland: Redefining gender and sexuality, 1880-1910 (PhD). University of Missouri. ProQuest 3577980.
