= Sexual slavery (disambiguation) =

Sexual slavery may refer to:

- Sexual slavery
- Human trafficking
- Sex Slaves (film)
- Sexual slavery (BDSM)
- Sex Slavery (essay), an 1890 anarcha-feminist essay by Voltairine de Cleyre
