= Voltairine de Cleyre =

American anarchist writer and feminist (1866–1912)

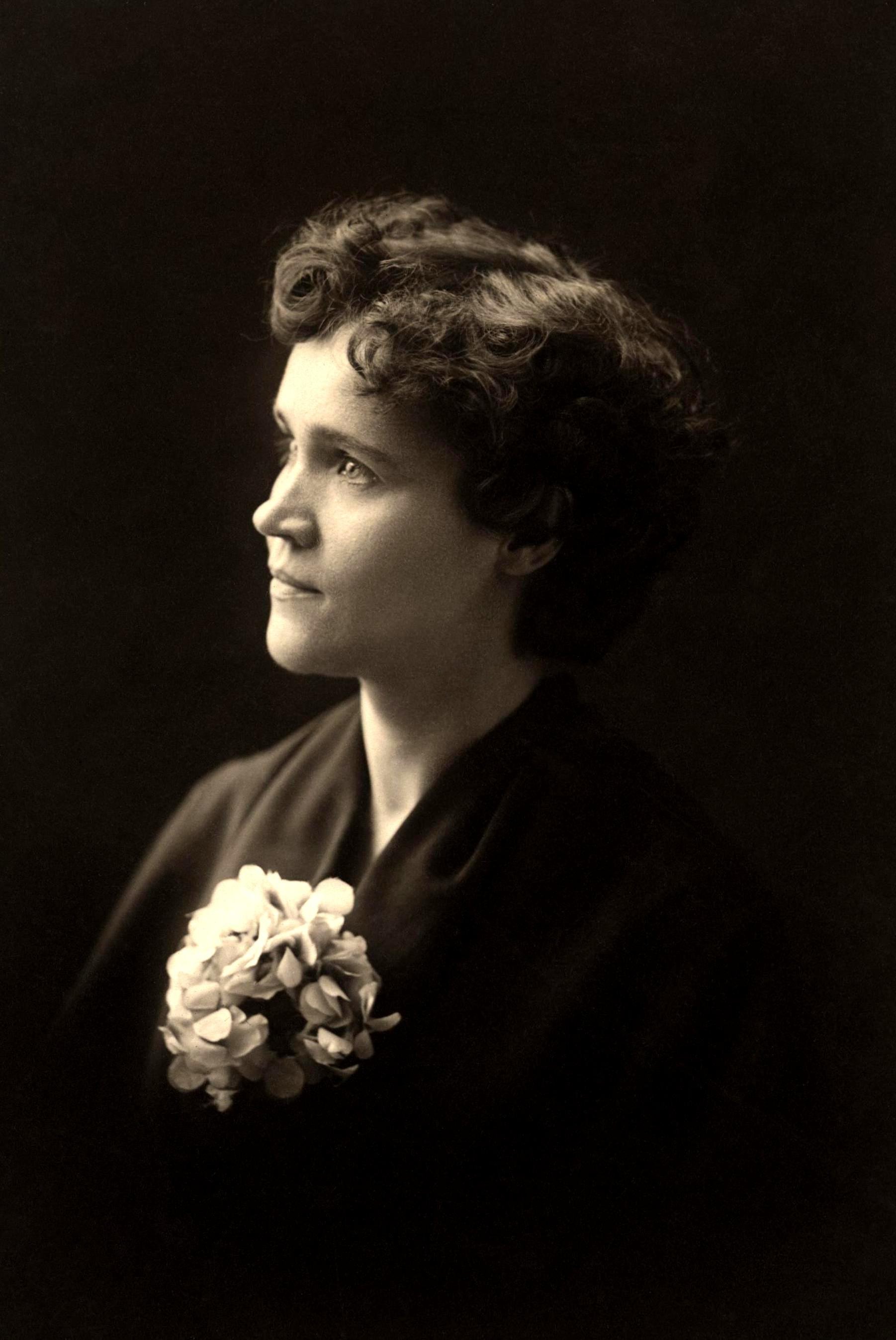
- De Cleyre in 1901
- Born: Voltairine De Claire; November 17, 1866; Leslie, Michigan, U.S.
- Died: June 20, 1912 (aged 45); Chicago, Illinois, U.S.
- Resting place: Waldheim Cemetery; 41.869909°N 87.8197364°W
- Occupations: Writer, lecturer, tutor
- Era: Second Industrial Revolution
- Movement: Anarchism, feminism, individualism
- Children: Harry de Cleyre
- Parents: Hector De Claire (father); Harriet De Claire (mother)
- Relatives: Adelaide D. Thayer (sister)

Voltairine de Cleyre (/ˌvɒltəˈriːn də ˈklɛər/; née De Claire; November 17, 1866 – June 20, 1912) was an American anarchist feminist writer and public speaker.

Born into extreme poverty in Michigan, de Cleyre taught herself how to read and write, and became a lover of poetry. She was educated at a Catholic convent, which improved her literary and linguistic capabilities, but also influenced her turn towards anti-theism and anti-authoritarianism. After graduating, de Cleyre began her activist career in the freethought movement, lecturing around the country and writing for a number of rationalist publications. Drawn towards socialism and individualist anarchism, she converted fully to anarchism in the wake of the Haymarket affair, which radicalized her against the state and capitalism.

She moved to Philadelphia, where she lived for most of her adult life and taught many of the city's Jewish anarchists. By the late 1890s, de Cleyre was a leading figure in the American anarchist movement, regularly speaking at events, writing for publications and organizing anarchist groups. She also went on a lecture tour of the United Kingdom, during which she was introduced to Spanish anarchists, who influenced her adoption of the philosophy of anarchism without adjectives and her later defense of the propaganda of the deed.

Following a murder attempt by Herman Helcher, a mentally ill former student of hers, her physical health rapidly deteriorated and she never fully recovered, but was able to return to writing and public speaking after a few years. During the free speech fights of the early 20th century, she was arrested for inciting a riot in Philadelphia. Towards the end of the 1900s decade, she grew increasingly depressed and lost her faith in anarchism. But by 1910, she had returned to the movement and moved to Chicago, where she lectured on progressive education. During the final years of her life, she was a keen supporter of the Mexican Revolution. She died in 1912, and was buried near the grave of the Haymarket anarchists.

Although eulogized by many anarchists of her time, she was largely forgotten or ignored in many histories of the anarchist movement, due in part to her short life. Her biographers, Paul Avrich and Margaret Marsh, and collectors of her writings, such as A. J. Brigati, Sharon Presley and Crispin Sartwell, brought her life and work back to public attention by the turn of the 21st century.

== Early life ==
Voltairine De Claire was born on November 17, 1866, in Leslie, Michigan. She was the third daughter of Hector De Claire, a French-American artisan and socialist, and Harriet De Claire, a New Englander whose family was involved in the abolitionist movement. Her father named her after the French philosopher Voltaire. After their first child's death, the family moved to St. Johns in May 1867, where De Claire grew up in extreme poverty. Adelaide De Claire later attributed her sister's radicalism to their experiences with poverty. The family's financial difficulties made De Claire's father bitter and demanding, while her mother withdrew her affections from her. De Claire never forgave her mother for her cold behavior towards her.

De Claire developed a love of nature and a "headstrong and emotional" personality. At age four, she was refused entry to primary school due to her young age. Indignant, she taught herself to read and was admitted the following year. She and Adelaide spent much of their time reading poetry and novels by British writers, particularly Lord Byron, who strongly influenced De Claire's writing style. She began writing her own poetry, in which she wrote of her wishes to be different and her love of nature. Anarchist Hippolyte Havel described her earliest poems as including a "vein of sadness".

In the 1870s, De Claire's father left St. Johns to seek work and never returned. In early 1879, after Adelaide fell gravely ill, De Claire was sent to live with her father in Port Huron. In September 1880, her father enrolled her at the convent of Our Lady of Lake Huron in the Canadian city of Sarnia, hoping to discipline her and curb her love of reading. De Claire considered her three years at the convent a prison sentence and felt abandoned by her father. She attempted to escape, but was not able to return home on foot. At the convent, De Claire attended services and classes given by the Carmelite nuns. As a Protestant, she was not required to recite Catholic prayers and was allowed to read the Bible. Her correspondence was monitored and sometimes withheld by the nuns, who punished her by isolating her from other students. Despite these conditions, De Claire improved her writing and music skills, became fluent in French, and learned piano.

Her anti-Catholicism was tempered as she developed sympathy for the Church's aesthetics and charity towards the poor, even briefly considering joining the Carmelite order. However, her skepticism intensified and she began doubting the existence of the Christian God. During this internal struggle between disbelief and religious conviction, she became a freethinker like her father, leading to increased punishments for insubordination. By graduation, De Claire had become a committed anti-theist and anti-authoritarian. She later recounted that this experience with "Ignorance and Superstition" convinced her that her own will was supreme and laid the foundations for her conversion to anarchism.

== Political career ==
=== Freethought ===
At 17, De Claire returned to St. Johns, where the she found that the convent's education had left her unprepared for work. In late 1885, she moved to Greenville, Michigan, where she tutored in handwriting, music, and French. By this time a convinced freethinker, De Claire gave lectures and wrote for the movement's periodicals. She began referring to herself as an "infidel" and a "radical". Through atheism, she first encountered anarchism, as both movements reject clerical and political authority.

In 1886, she moved to Grand Rapids and became editor-in-chief of the weekly freethought magazine The Progressive Age. She published under the pen name "Fanny Fern" (adopted from the popular writer) and changed her signature from Voltairine De Claire to Voltairine de Cleyre in 1887. Her speaking tours drew large audiences, who came to hear her recount her experiences in the convent. As a self-described "writer" rather than orator, she carefully prepared and read her speeches from paper. She would publish hundreds of works throughout her life, including lectures and political essays, as well as poems and short stories. Her form of progressive literature aimed to provoke a psycho-social liberation in her readers, whom she hoped to free from oppressive ideologies.

Her growing fame led to lecture tours for the American Secular Union throughout the Midwestern and Northeastern United States. Her family disapproved of her radical politics and talked very little about it when she visited them in Michigan. She contributed to several freethought periodicals, including The Truth Seeker, and enjoyed traveling despite the poverty and repression she witnessed. Eventually finding the freethought movement too narrow in focus, she began exploring other social reform movements, including feminism, socialism, and anarchism.

=== Conversion to anarchism ===
In December 1887, a lecture by Clarence Darrow introduced de Cleyre to socialist programs for improving working-class conditions. She quickly became an anti-capitalist and a socialist, denouncing monopolies, labor exploitation, and all forms of oppression. Debates with Jewish anarchists in Pittsburgh influenced her to study anarchist theory, particularly the individualist anarchism of Benjamin Tucker's Liberty. She soon abandoned state socialism for anarchism.

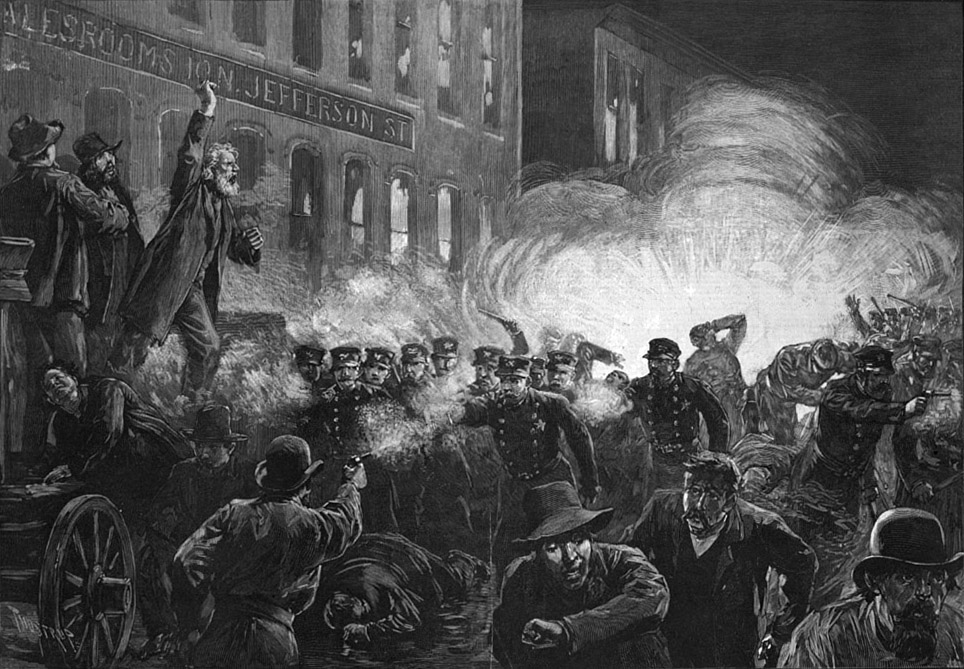
Illustration of the Haymarket affair

The Haymarket affair accelerated her conversion to anarchism. Her initial reaction to the Chicago workers' rally bombing had been to call for the perpetrators to be hanged, which she immediately regretted. Following the trial of eight organizers, she concluded the men had been falsely accused in a show trial and questioned whether "justice under the law" was possible. When four were executed, they became martyrs in her eyes, and she embraced anarchism for the rest of her life.

A series of romantic affairs in the following year left lasting impacts. She fell in love with Scottish labor organizer Thomas Hamilton Garside, but he abandoned her after months, leaving her devastated. Dyer Lum, 27 years her senior, became a stabilizing influence with whom she developed her understanding of anarchism, adopting his mutualism and evolutionary ethics. Though their affair was short-lived due to his marriage and her other relationships, they remained collaborators until his death in 1893.

=== Philadelphia ===
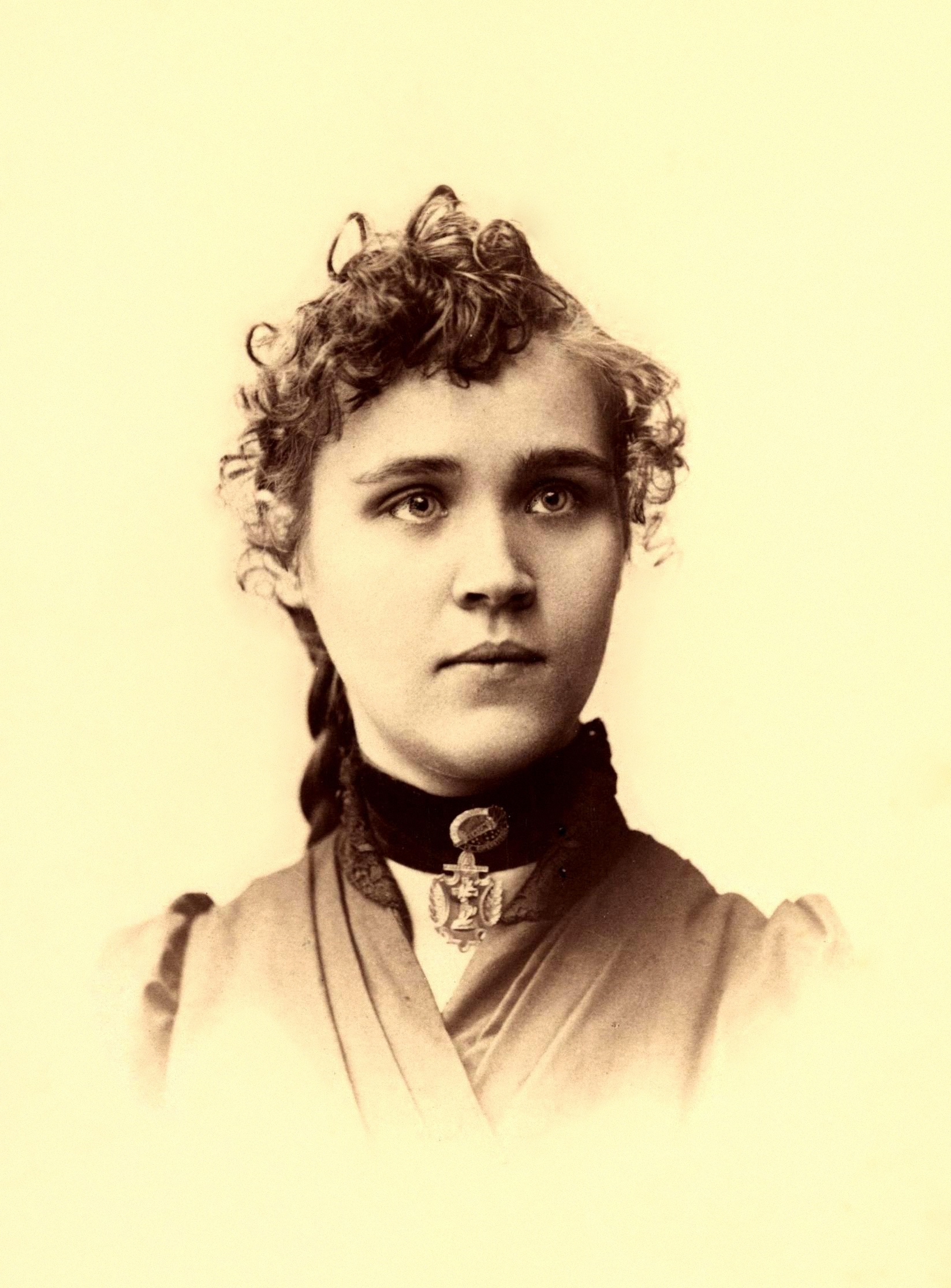
de Cleyre, Christmas 1891

In June 1888, de Cleyre visited Philadelphia for the first time, having been invited to speak at a freethinkers' meeting. She was so impressed by the city that she decided to move there the following year, making the city her home for the next two decades. There she met the freethinker James B. Elliott, with whom she had a brief romantic relationship. As de Cleyre refused Elliott's proposal of marriage, it quickly broke down and they separated, although they remained friends and lived together for several years afterwards. During this time, de Cleyre became pregnant; it was not a happy memory for her, as her pregnancy was characterized by long periods of pain and sickness. She considered having an abortion, but her doctor advised against it, believing her health was not strong enough to sustain one. On June 12, 1890, de Cleyre gave birth to their son Harry, but her chronic condition and depressive mood made her feel physically and emotionally incapable of raising him. She soon went off to lecture at freethought events in Kansas, where she remained for almost a year. There she joined Matilda Joslyn Gage's Woman's National Liberal Union, a feminist-freethinkers' organization which opposed the centralization of power by both the church and the state. She returned to Philadelphia in 1891, but she largely stayed away from her son. Her sister Adelaide, herself childless, asked if she could take care of Harry, to which de Cleyre responded that it was up to Elliott to decide; he refused. The rest of de Cleyre's correspondence from this period never mentions her son.

In Philadelphia, de Cleyre began tutoring Jewish anarchist immigrants in the English language, which provided her with a small income. She still lived in poor conditions and her work exhausted her, but her lack of professional education meant that she had no options for alternative lines of work. Her income was only occasionally supplemented by translation and publishing work. She lived an austere lifestyle, possessing few clothes and eating very little, which, combined with overwork, worsened her chronic illness. During this time, she took on hundreds of Jewish students and became friends with many more. In her later essay, "The Making of an Anarchist", she praised the Jewish community's dedication to their education and commitment to the radical movement, even in the face of extreme poverty and antisemitism in the United States. But she was also worried by the tendency of some of her Jewish comrades to assimilate into the dominant American capitalist culture, relinquishing social change for individual advancement.

While she taught her students the English language, de Cleyre herself endeavored to learn Yiddish, eventually becoming fluent in it. She regularly read and contributed articles to the Yiddish anarchist magazine, the Fraye Arbeter Shtime, warning the editor Saul Yanovsky against cutting up or changing her words when translating them from English. She also translated Yiddish essays and articles from Mother Earth, and even tried her hand at writing original works in Yiddish, but only one has survived. Meanwhile, a number of her own pupils, including Nathan Navro and Joseph J. Cohen, gained enough fluency in English to publish articles in Anglophone anarchist publications.

She was particularly attracted to her young student Samuel H. Gordon, who later became her lover and political collaborator. She paid for his medical education, after which he began to move away from anarchism as he saw personal professional success. As time went on, they argued more frequently and more angrily, with one particularly bad argument ending in them both taking poison, although they both survived. De Cleyre herself claimed that the argument was because she had rejected his marriage proposal, refusing to become a domestic housewife.

=== Feud with Emma Goldman ===
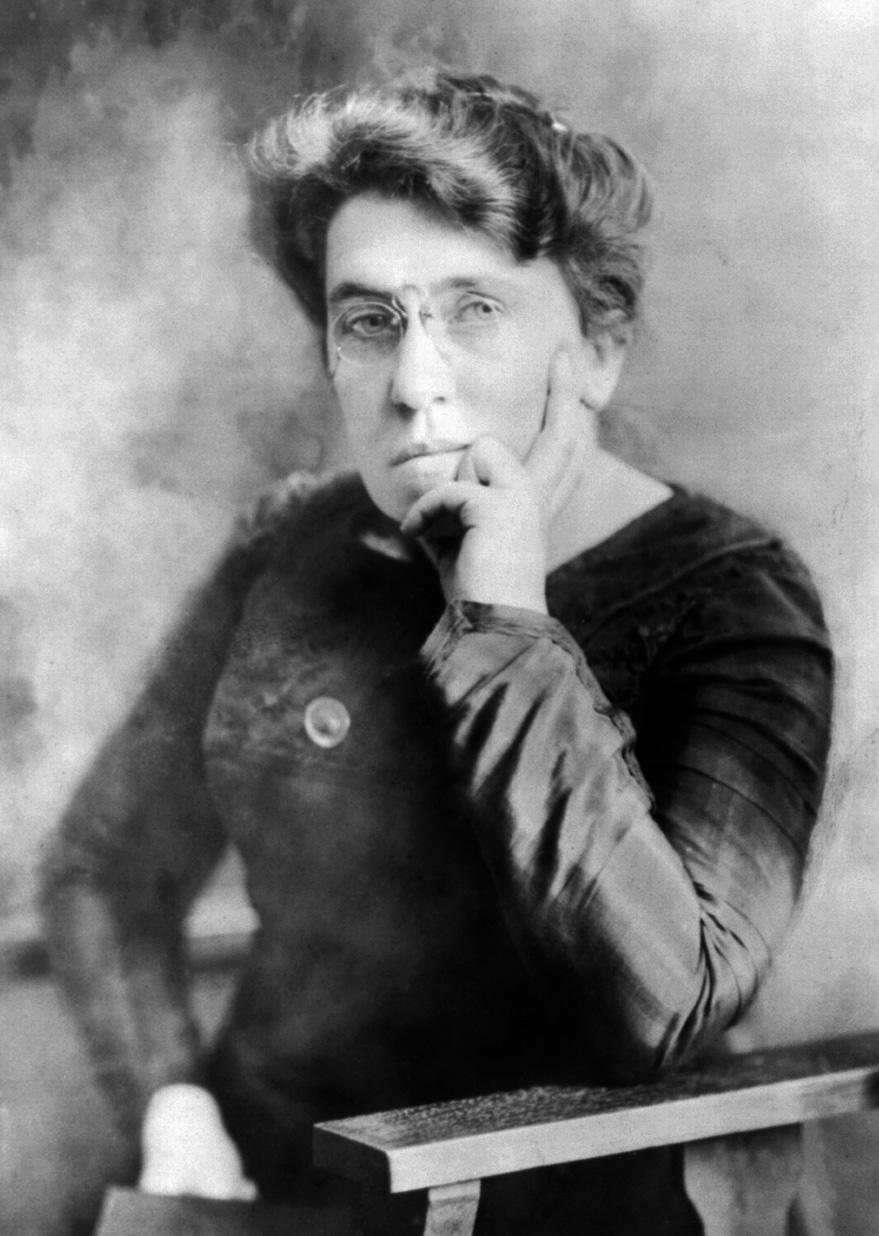
Emma Goldman, with whom de Cleyre would have a personal feud for most of her life

In August 1893, de Cleyre first met the anarchist activist Emma Goldman. She attended a rally that Goldman was due to address, but when Goldman was arrested before she could speak, de Cleyre spoke in her place, protesting against the suppression of freedom of speech. They met again in December, when de Cleyre travelled to New York to speak in her defense. She visited Goldman in her cell on Blackwell's Island, where they discussed anarchism and the recent imprisonment of Alexander Berkman. Back in Philadelphia, de Cleyre wrote that she would soon return to see Goldman, together with her partner Gordon. But Gordon was a follower of Johann Most, who had publicly denounced Berkman and Goldman. Goldman informed de Cleyre that she preferred not to see Gordon, as it would have used up one of her two monthly prison visitations. De Cleyre was hurt by the rebuff and did not write back; she did not even speak to Goldman after her release. They only briefly resumed contact when Goldman appealed for de Cleyre's help in campaigning for the reduction of Berkman's prison sentence.

Although they shared an anarchist feminist outlook, the two had divergent backgrounds and personalities. Historian Paul Avrich said that de Cleyre and Goldman differed "as poetry differs from prose", while their mutual friend Carl Nold compared their oratory respectively to a violin and a bass drum. De Cleyre herself disliked Goldman's style of public speaking and writing, dismissing her work as "incoherent", while also privately admitting their "force". De Cleyre criticised Goldman's indulgences in material pleasures, which provoked a reaction from the latter. De Cleyre's "puritan" resentment of what she perceived as middle-class extravagance, from social drinking to birthday parties, drew criticism from other anarchists. She routinely denounced respectability politics and intellectualism, which she thought was moving the anarchist movement away from the working class and towards the bourgeoisie. Goldman took this as a personal attack and denied the charges, while also defending her appeals to the middle classes.

=== Agitation, education and organization ===
By the end of the 19th century, de Cleyre had become one of the leading public figures of the American anarchist movement. She acted as a link between the Jewish immigrants and American workers of Philadelphia, and contributed several articles, poems and stories to many anarchist publications. She delivered numerous lectures throughout the Northeastern United States. Her regular speaking engagements included commemorations of the Paris Commune, which took place each March, and memorial meetings for the Haymarket martyrs, which took place each May. At one such meeting, she praised Illinois governor John Peter Altgeld for pardoning the Haymarket defendants, declaring that he had "sacrificed his political career to an act of justice". She believed that the Haymarket martyrs had not died in vain, as their sacrifice had served to invigorate the anarchist movement.

She was also active as a movement functionary, organizing meetings, establishing groups and distributing literature. In the early 1890s, she established an anarchist study group together with Dyer Lum, and in 1892, she co-founded the Ladies' Liberal League (LLL), a freethinking feminist group which organized forums on various political subjects. Through the LLL, she met Margaret Perle McLeod and Natasha Noshkin, with whom she helped establish a Radical Library that provided an education space for Jewish anarchists in Philadelphia. She also became friends with the Danish-American anarchist Mary Hansen and her English partner George Brown, with whom she regularly had dinner and discussed literature, eventually moving in with them in 1894.

Over time, de Cleyre's tutoring work, anarchist activism and sustained poverty had exhausted her. Aside from visiting her friends, she lived a rather isolated and secluded life, kept company by her pet cats, birds and fish. Although often lonely and depressed, de Cleyre cherished the independence she had in Philadelphia and thought herself strong for living her life according to her own principles.

=== Travels in Britain ===
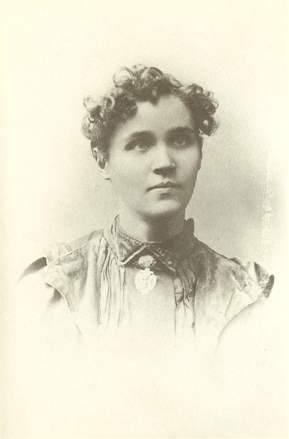
de Cleyre, pictured in 1897 during her time in London

In 1895, de Cleyre began contributing to The Rebel, an anarchist communist magazine founded by the English anarchist Charles Mowbray, for whom de Cleyre had previously raised funds for his legal defense against sedition charges. Although she wrote under a nom de plume and disagreed with communist economics, she was briefly considered for the role of editor-in-chief. In early 1897, she became pregnant again and sought an abortion; it was a painful procedure and caused her a lot of pain and a flare up of her illness. As her health declined and arguments with her partner Gordon increased, her fellow magazine contributors Harry Kelly and John Turner convinced her to visit the United Kingdom. She set sail on June 13, 1897, arriving in England within a week. She stayed in London for two months, as a guest in John and Mary Turner's house. She was introduced to the Freedom Group, as well as the German historian Max Nettlau, Jewish anarchist editor Abraham Frumkin and the labor organizer William Wess.

Through Wess, she met the famous Russian anarchist Peter Kropotkin, who told her over a cup of tea about his escape from the Russian Empire. She also met Mary Turner's sister-in-law Lizzie Bell, the wife of Thomas Hastie Bell, with whom she became fast friends and stayed in each other's company throughout de Cleyre's time in Britain. She was a repeat visitor of the British Museum, where she saw Lord Byron's own handwriting; she also paid her respects at Byron's grave. She even traveled to visit Stonehenge, which she had wanted to see her whole life. In contrast, she strongly disliked London due to its heavy air pollution. She was nevertheless very happy among her friends in the city, which provided a much-needed break from her work life, causing her health and mood to sharply improve.

In August 1897, a group of Spanish anarchists arrived in London, having escaped the severe political repression of the Montjuïc trials. De Cleyre, who herself had been active in spreading awareness of the repression in Spain, greeted 28 of the Spanish refugees upon their arrival. After their wounds were treated by a doctor, they held a mass meeting in Trafalgar Square and a number of smaller meetings in private homes. They described to de Cleyre the repression they had faced and showed her the scars left by their torture in the Montjuïc Castle. At one of these meetings, the Italian anarchist Michele Angiolillo resolved to assassinate the Spanish prime minister Antonio Cánovas del Castillo. De Cleyre sympathized with his attack against Castillo, writing three poems and a short story about him. His execution inspired her to write another poem, "Light Upon Waldheim", in which she lovingly described the Haymarket Martyrs' Monument in Waldheim Cemetery. Her meetings with the Spanish anarchists, who had strengthened her commitment to libertarian and anti-authoritarian thought, also inspired her to begin learning the Spanish language. She was most impressed by Fernando Tarrida del Mármol, from whom she adopted and developed the philosophy of anarchism without adjectives. During this time, she also met a number of French anarchists, including former Communards, such as Jean Grave. In mid-August, she took a week-long trip to Paris, where she met Sébastien Faure, saw the city's sites and paid her respects to the revolutionaries buried in the Père Lachaise Cemetery.

After returning to Britain, she decided to visit Scotland. While staying in Glasgow's neighborhood of Govanhill with Maggie and Will Duff, she quickly fell in love with the country, remarking that if she could make a living there, she would never return to America. She gave a series of lectures in all of Scotland's major cities, remarking with sadness that Dundee had been "disfigured by vomiting chimneys" and reporting of its problems with child labor. Before she left, the Duffs gave her a poetry collection by the English socialist Francis Adams. In September 1897, she left Glasgow and returned to London, stopping off at Bradford, Leeds and Manchester, where she gave a series of lectures on anarchism and feminism. Back in London, she gave one final address to the Jewish anarchists at the South Place Ethical Society, before returning to America.

=== Return to activism in America ===
De Cleyre was reinvigorated by her time in Britain and immediately returned to her writing and speaking engagements. She began writing regular reports on the United States for the Freedom newspaper in London, and started a translation of Jean Grave's Moribund Society and Anarchy. Her work on the latter was accelerated by the outbreak of the Spanish–American War, as she thought the book had been made more relevant by the rise of American imperialism. Although she criticized the United States' involvement in the war, she did not offer an unqualified condemnation of the war itself, due to her belief that the Spanish Empire needed to be broken up, even if a government was required to do so.

Once again, she began to overwork herself and her health began to sharply decline. She returned to her tutoring work, which marginally improved her financial situation. Despite making so little money that she was malnourished, she refused to take any money from the anarchist movement. In order to conserve her energy, she curbed her speaking and writing efforts, passing her "American Notes" column at Freedom over to Harry Kelly. She was able to find a quiet farm in Torresdale, owned by the spiritualist Sada Bailey Fowler, where being closer to nature provided a peaceful and relaxing environment for her to recover in.

She soon returned to Philadelphia and went back to tutoring, writing and public speaking tours. While in Chicago in November 1899, she met the Russian social revolutionary Nahum Berman with whom she briefly had a relationship before returning to Philadelphia. He died only a few months after she left. Inspired by Berman, she established another anarchist reading group, the Social Science Club, which soon became the foremost anarchist group in Philadelphia. Together with other members of the group, she moved into a house in Fairmount Avenue. By this time, her partner Samuel H. Gordon had graduated as a Doctor of Medicine, left the anarchist movement and broken up with de Cleyre after she rejected his marriage proposal. De Cleyre and her anarchist group held a number of public meetings outside Philadelphia City Hall, where she gave speeches and distributed leaflets, gaining hundreds of new converts to the anarchist movement. De Cleyre and George Brown also gave lectures to high school and university students, and distributed anarchist propaganda at labor union meetings.

=== Repression and direct action ===
The group's propaganda activities began to face difficulties in the wake of the assassination of William McKinley by Leon Czolgosz, which unleashed a wave of political repression against the anarchist movement. De Cleyre hoped that the widespread anti-anarchist sentiment would subside, but it continued unabated over the subsequent weeks. Philadelphia police raided anarchist clubs, broke up their public meetings and surveilled their members. Although de Cleyre herself was never arrested, she publicly denounced the political repression. In March 1902, after Senator Joseph R. Hawley offered $1,000 (equivalent to $37,212 in 2025) to take a shot at an anarchist, de Cleyre publicly accepted his challenge in an open letter published in the Free Society newspaper.

Although she did not agree with his assassination, she remarked that assassination attempts were an occupational hazard of being a head of state. De Cleyre believed McKinley's support for capitalism and imperialism had been responsible for his own death. Although de Cleyre had previously rejected violence as a pacifist, her sympathy for Czolgosz's attack against McKinley marked a turning point, as she increasingly began to accept violent methods such as propaganda of the deed. She continued to believe that violent action was almost always unreasonable, she came to consider that there were some cases in which violence became the only effective way of opposing tyranny. To de Cleyre, anarchists should not preach violence, but should not condemn violent acts against the system either. She believed that violent attacks by individuals were inevitable responses to the severity of state violence. She sympathized with the self-sacrifice displayed by anarchist assassins, and mourned them when they were executed. While never abandoning her preference for non-violence and education, she also began to vocally support acts of "direct action".

== Later life ==
=== Assassination attempt and declining health ===
On December 19, 1902, de Cleyre was shot three times at point blank range by Herman Helcher, a former student who had developed an obsession with her and harbored paranoid delusions about her actions. One bullet embedded in her chest and two more were lodged in her back. She was rushed to the Hahnemann University Hospital, but as the establishment practiced homeopathy, no surgery to remove the bullets was performed. Although the wounds were presumed to be fatal, she recovered after a few days.

De Cleyre refused to identify or press charges against Helcher. She expressed empathy for his situation, due to his mental disorder and extreme poverty, which she believed had driven him to attempt such an act of violence. While she was still in recovery, she publicly defended him, refusing to appear as a witness in his trial and campaigning for his release from jail. She appealed to Free Society in an open letter, asking that her comrades in the anarchist movement show him forgiveness and organize a defense fund for him. Despite her appeals, Helcher was found guilty of attempted murder. He was committed to a mental asylum, where he died.

De Cleyre returned home from hospital on January 2, 1903. She soon resumed her regular life, giving public lectures on the issue of "Crime and Punishment" before audiences of hundreds of people. She rallied against the prison system, declaring that, in all the years of retributive justice, states had never been able to eliminate crime. She believed that violence begets violence. She rejected the criminal psychology of Cesare Lombroso, doubting his hypothesis that criminals were naturally inclined to commit crime. She admitted that some criminals were driven by mental disorders, like Helcher himself, but believed that they ought to be treated medically rather than subjected to carceral punishment. To de Cleyre, prisons failed as institutions of rehabilitation, as they cultivated bitterness in prisoners and alienated them from society. She thus called for the abolition of retributive justice by resolving the material conditions that drove people to crime. De Cleyre's response to her own attempted murder gained her substantial sympathy from the public and generated publicity in the Philadelphia press.

By May 1903, de Cleyre had fully resumed her anarchist activism, rallying support for a textile workers' strike in Germantown. But her activities again exhausted her and, on the advice of her doctors to seek rest and recuperation, she decided to take a trip to Norway. As her trip coincided with German kaiser Wilhelm II's state visit to Norway, the local press speculated whether she was intending to assassinate him and she was closely surveilled by the Norwegian police from the moment she arrived. She visited Christiania and spent weeks hiking in the countryside of Nes, but ended up being disappointed with Norway's "chilly" climate and people and decided instead to visit Glasgow. After giving a public speech on anarchism at a meeting of the Norwegian Labour Party, she departed for Scotland, where she again stayed with the Duffs. She then went to London, where she met the German anarchist Rudolf Rocker, a fellow Yiddish-speaking gentile, and gave a lecture at the South Place Institute.

Upon her return to the United States, her health suddenly experienced a dramatic decline; her chronic condition was finally diagnosed as an atrophy of tissues caused by a catarrh in her nose. By early 1904, the infection had spread to the rest of her head and her ears, causing her to temporarily experience hearing loss and leaving her with a loud pounding noise in her ears that lasted for the rest of her life. The infection compelled her to rest and recuperate, as the pain caused her difficulty in speaking and prevented her from concentrating on her writing. She nevertheless wrote on a weekly basis to John Turner, while he awaited deportation. Her health failed to improve, even after spending a month at the Philadelphia Jewish Hospital and two further months at a farm in Torresdale. She then went to the Medico-Chirurgical Hospital, where she stayed from September 1904 to January 1905. During this time, she experienced regular convulsions and her condition was presumed fatal; Moses Harman prepared an obituary and memorial issue of Lucifer for her. Natasha Noshkin and Emma Goldman themselves established the "Friends of Voltairine de Cleyre" group, which appealed for financial support from the anarchist movement. Goldman, who had not seen de Cleyre since their feud, committed herself fully to supporting her. Hillel Solotaroff approached Samuel Gordon to request he help his former lover and benefactor, but Gordon refused.

Despite her condition, on Christmas Day of 1904, de Cleyre left the hospital to attend a meeting being held by the Russian Socialist Revolutionary Catherine Breshkovsky. De Cleyre attempted to speak at the meeting, but her condition prevented her from doing so and her friends forced her to return to hospital. After she left the hospital, her mother came to care for her, but her health failed to improve. She became frustrated with the physicians who had kept her alive, without being able to cure her of her illness. Before long, the intense pain caused by her chronic illness made her contemplate suicide. After her mother returned to Michigan, she took a morphine overdose, leaving a suicide note in which she committed her body to research at the Hahnemann Medical College, but the morphine did not kill her. Under Nathan Navro's care, she made a recovery, although she would remain in chronic pain and weakened health for the rest of her life.

=== Return to writing ===
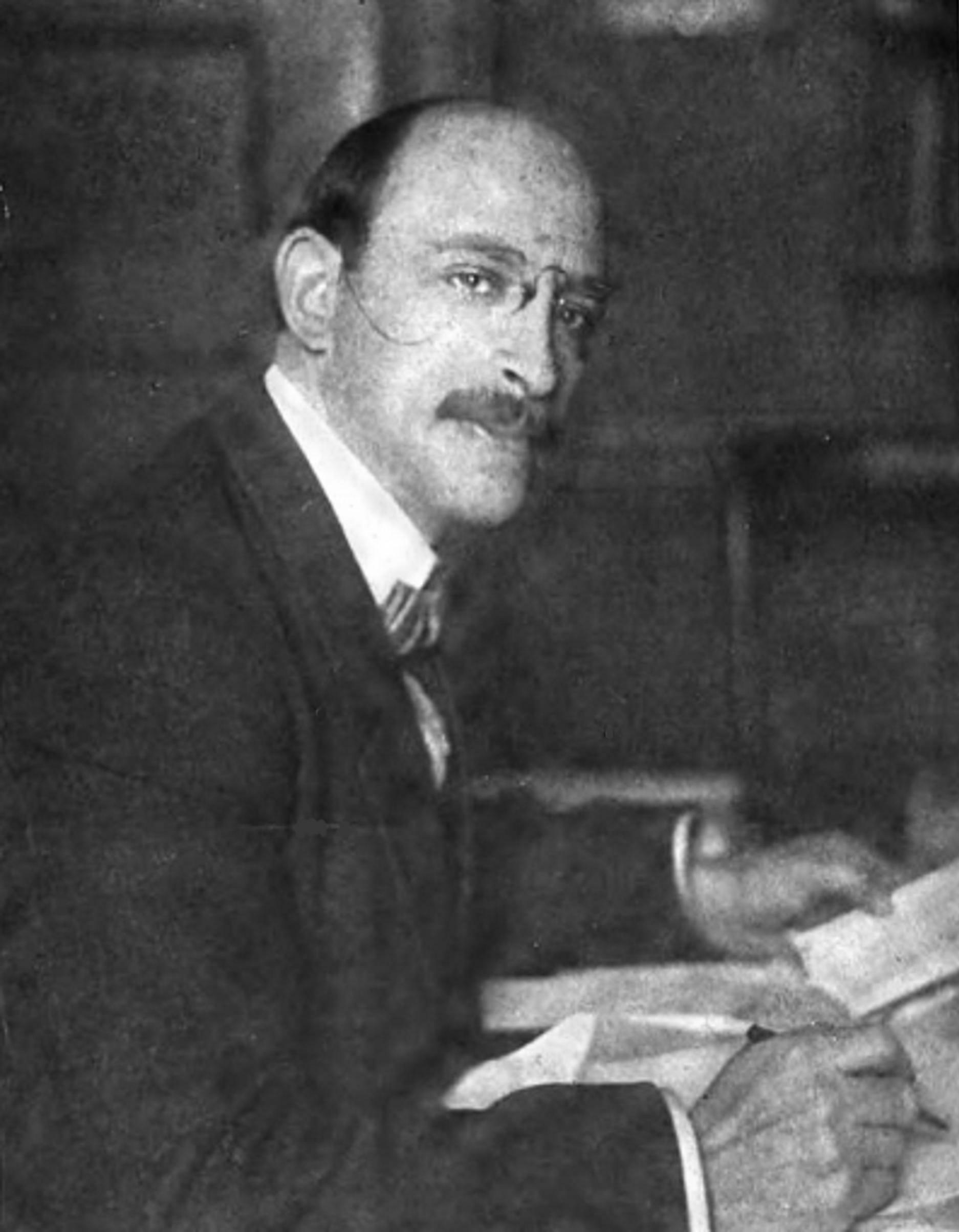
Alexander Berkman, the editor of Mother Earth and a close collaborator of de Cleyre's during the late 1900s

After three years of severe illness, by the spring of 1906, de Cleyre had regained enough of her strength to return to her regular activities. By October 1906, she was organizing a lecture series for the Social Science Club and addressing the annual Haymarket memorial event in Chicago. She then went on another lecture tour, speaking at freethought meetings in several cities of the Northeastern United States. While visiting New York, she visited Emma Goldman and spoke together with her at anarchist meetings; their relationship had improved substantially since Goldman had aided de Cleyre through her illness. De Cleyre was happy to hear news from Goldman that the anarchist movement was growing throughout the continent, but regretted that her health prevented her from visiting the Pacific coast. Before long, de Cleyre once again began referring to Goldman as her "friend and comrade" and later defended her against attacks from an English socialist paper. She also contributed essays, short stories and poems to Goldman's magazine Mother Earth, which gave her a platform to discuss many of the debates within the anarchist movement.

Through this publication, de Cleyre met its editor Alexander Berkman. She attempted to start a weekly publication with Berkman, but the project was not realized during her lifetime, only taking form in 1916 with the publication of The Blast. Over the summer of 1906, the two became close friends. She gave him advice for writing and editing his memoirs; she proofread every page, issued corrections and style suggestions. De Cleyre predicted that it would be hailed as a masterpiece, and her biographer Paul Avrich partly credits her for the book's positive reception.

=== Free speech fights ===
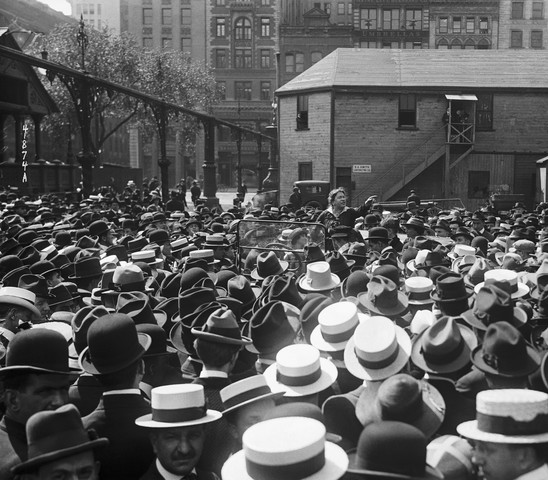
Emma Goldman speaking before an unemployment demonstration in New York

During the Panic of 1907, which saw millions of workers lose their jobs, the Philadelphia anarchists organized a series of unemployment demonstrations and mass meetings. In an address to unemployed workers on February 20, 1908, De Cleyre spoke out against the capitalist system and called for workers to expropriate the means of production and private property. After a workers' demonstration on Broad Street was escalated into a riot and broken up by police, de Cleyre herself was arrested for the first and only time in her life. Her arresting officers were surprised that she did not resemble the stereotypical anarchist and that her papers included revolutionary poems about worms.

She and Chaim Weinberg were tried on June 18, 1908, but as the prosecution failed to produce a witness, the judge rendered a "not guilty" verdict. When Italian workers implicated in the Broad Street Riot were sentenced to several years of penal labor, de Cleyre immediately established a defense committee in order to raise funds for the convicted workers and agitate for their release. By 1909, she managed to secure the release of two of the prisoners.

The Broad Street Riot came at a time when a number of unemployment riots and free speech fights were breaking out throughout the country. On June 30, 1909, a mass meeting was held at the Cooper Union by the National Free Speech Committee, on which de Cleyre was one of the leading anarchist members. At the meeting, she declared that the only way that freedom of speech could be defended was by continuing to speak freely. When the police prevented Emma Goldman from speaking at a number of public meetings in Philadelphia, de Cleyre organized rallies against police censorship and in defense of her freedom of speech.

=== Worsening depression ===
While continuing to teach in the evenings, de Cleyre dedicated herself to anarchist activism, overseeing the integration of the Social Science Club and Radical Library into The Workers Circle. She began earning enough money from her teaching to move into a well-furnished apartment, but her chronic illness still caused her severe and constant pain. She wrote to Berkman that she had begun to hate life itself, which she saw as having caused endless suffering. She became isolated and fell into a deep depression. When she was visited by Samuel Gordon, she apparently did not recognize him, even though she still kept a picture of him on her wall. She increasingly remarked that joy no longer appealed to her; her depression left her without hope and sapped her of her energy.

She went back to her family home in St. Johns to spend some time with her mother. She also visited Port Huron and Sarnia, finding that both towns had experienced great urban decay. Her return to the land of her childhood provoked a sense of nostalgia within her, but she ultimately resolved to return to Philadelphia. By December 1909, she was back in Philadelphia, where her depression again resurfaced.

As de Cleyre's depression worsened, she began to lose her faith in anarchism, coming to believe that societal ignorance and prejudice were too strong to overcome. In February 1910, she rejected Berkman's invitation to speak in New York as she felt that she had nothing to say. Berkman now found himself providing de Cleyre with moral support; he suggested that she leave Philadelphia to do another lecture tour, but she rebuffed him. Joseph Cohen likewise suggested she do a lecture tour and she rebuffed him too, proclaiming that she no longer believed in her former anarchist philosophy. But as her depression continued, she began to reconsider their suggestions that she could benefit from a change in location. By August 1910, she had decided to move to Chicago.

=== Ferrer movement activism ===
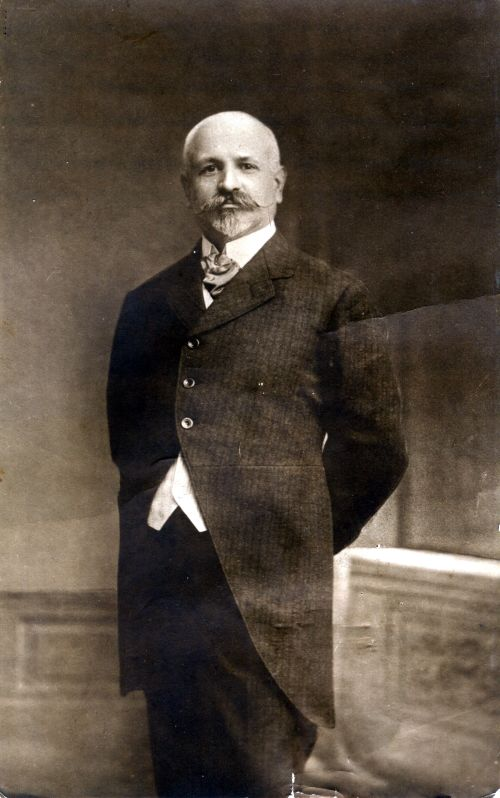
Francesc Ferrer, the Spanish pedagogue who inspired the Ferrer movement

In October 1910, she left Philadelphia, moving through New York while lecturing on several subjects. In Buffalo, New York, she addressed a meeting of the Ferrer movement, which had formed after the execution of the Spanish pedagogue Francesc Ferrer. She sympathized with Ferrer's anti-authoritarian and secular approach to education, and denounced the Spanish state for executing a teacher. She lectured on the need for "integral" education to improve people's skills, without interference from the church or state. Alongside book learning, she believed that children ought to be educated by observing nature and doing things for themselves. Her ideal school was a boarding school in the countryside, with a farm and workshop provided for children to learn any craft of their choosing. Her educational letters received criticism from a number of Buffalo newspapers, which prompted her to point out that her formal education had been in a Catholic school but her own philosophy had been shaped by her experiences in life.

From Buffalo, she moved on to Cleveland, where she addressed another meeting of the Ferrer movement. She recalled that a priest had become so angry with her anti-Catholic remarks that he went to get a police officer, but never managed to return with one. She then traveled through Michigan, finally arriving in Chicago in time to address the annual Haymarket memorial event. She rented a room in the city from the local Jewish anarchists Jacob and Anna Livshis. In Chicago, she again supported herself through tutoring work, gaining many clients after posting an advert in the Fraye Arbeter Shtime. Through teaching English and mathematics, she was able to earn a weekly salary of $13.50 (equivalent to $466 in 2025), part of which she sent to her mother.

She continued her lectures in Chicago, giving weekly talks at the city's Modern School. Despite her interest in pedagogy, she largely did not teach children, as she disliked being around them. She also became more critical of the Ferrer movement due to its vague educational programme, which she felt did not clearly outline what it wanted children to learn and how. She was dissatisfied with the Chicago Modern School, which she described as chaotic and disordered. She left the school in January 1911 and turned down an offer from Alexander Berkman to take over management of a Ferrer school in New York. She worried that activists had hastily joined the Ferrer movement without understanding what such education entailed. Before long, she had become completely disillusioned with the Ferrer movement and began to think that the best way to change education was to convert teachers within state schools to progressive methods.

=== Support for the Mexican Revolution ===
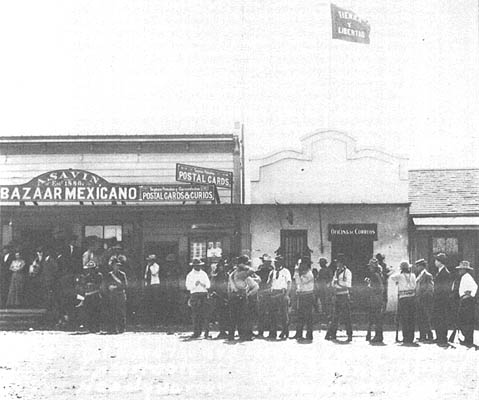
Mexican revolutionaries following the First Battle of Tijuana

Her change in location ultimately failed to affect her mood, and de Cleyre once again fell into a depression. She found it increasingly difficult to write, lacked the confidence that drove her during her earlier years, and became apathetic towards her earlier political beliefs. Physically and emotionally exhausted, she became irritable towards those around her, finding living in the communal Livshis house difficult due to its lack of privacy. She longed for peace and quiet, even finding herself desiring to return to a convent. Just as her depression was reaching its lowest point, the Mexican Revolution broke out.

Her spirits were rapidly lifted and she devoted herself to supporting the revolution. She believed that the events in Mexico were the social revolution she had been waiting for most of her adult life. She found the direct action of the Mexican peasant movement to be a refreshing alternative to the obsession with political theory that was expressed in the American anarchist publications. She denounced the racism expressed by White Americans towards the indigenous Mexican and Mestizo revolutionaries, exalting their desire for land and freedom and rejecting American stereotypes of "Mexican laziness". By July 1911, she was working for the Magonist newspaper Regeneración. She also established the Mexican Liberal Defense League, for which she served as treasurer.

She appealed for funds from anarchist newspapers and groups. She defended the revolution at both public and private meetings, and distributed copies of Regeneración and William C. Owen's pamphlets throughout Chicago. She was ultimately dissatisfied with the $250 (equivalent to $8,341 in 2025) which she managed to collect for the revolution, expressing frustration that American libertarians had been so slow and ineffectual in aiding the struggling Mexican revolutionaries. During this time, she met and began a relationship with the Czech anarchist Joseph Kucera, who she collaborated with closely on her activities to support the revolution. She also studied the Spanish language and planned to travel to Los Angeles, but her illness prevented her from going, so Kucera went instead. Her last published poem was dedicated to the Mexican Revolution.

=== Final years and death ===
In her later years, de Cleyre developed a strong sympathy for the Industrial Workers of the World (IWW), which moved her closer to left-wing politics and anti-capitalism. At the same time, she abandoned her long-held pacifism, began advocating for violent social revolution and appealed for her readers to carry out direct action. In the wake of the Los Angeles Times bombing in 1910, she wrote a letter to Saul Yanovsky in which she expressed regret that the bombing had not killed the paper's publisher, Harrison Gray Otis. In a subsequent letter to Alexander Berkman, she reported of her new-found "class consciousness" and belief in class conflict. Together with Berkman and Goldman, she publicly defended the bombing suspects, the McNamaras, and accused the labor leaders Samuel Gompers and Morris Hillquit of hypocrisy for demanding they be punished. She asked why they had not demanded justice for the many more workers who had died in the Johnstown Flood of 1889, Panic of 1907 and Cherry Mine disaster of 1909, and declared that such events had made violence against the capitalist system a necessity. During the San Diego free speech fight of 1912, she expressed outrage that one hundred members of the IWW "had been made to kneel and kiss the flag", declaring that she would rather have been shot than forced to prostrate herself.

Despite her failing health, she over-worked herself writing letters, giving speeches, organizing meetings and demonstrations and editing others' memoirs. By April 1912, her health broke under fatigue. She experienced chronic pain, headaches and sensory overload, exacerbated by the extreme weather in Chicago. She also experienced social isolation and homesickness for Philadelphia. On April 17, she came down with an attack of otitis media. She was moved to the St. Mary of Nazareth Hospital, where her infection was found to have spread to her brain. By the time that her son and Nathan Navro had arrived from Philadelphia, she had lost the ability to speak or move her body. She was only able to express her disapproval of a passing priest with a scowl. De Cleyre spent the last nine weeks of her life in pain in her hospital bed, finally dying on June 20, 1912.

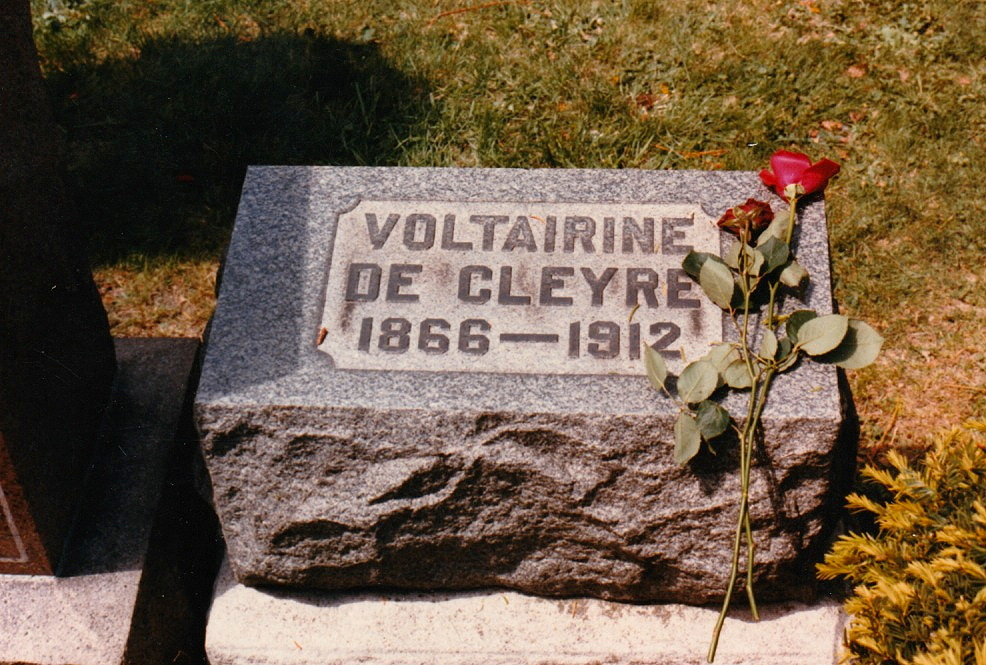
De Cleyre's grave in Waldheim Cemetery, Forest Park, Illinois

Three days later, her body was buried at the Waldheim Cemetery, next to the tomb of the Haymarket martyrs. Her funeral was attended by 2,000 people, including representatives of several trade unions. De Cleyre's sister Addie recalled Lucy Parsons arranging red carnations on her casket, while the crowd stood in silence. Simultaneous gatherings were held in Philadelphia and New York. When Emma Goldman returned to Chicago from a lecture tour, she immediately went to lay flowers at her grave, where she expressed her feeling that the Haymarket martyrs had gained another member.

== Political thought ==
=== Anarchist philosophy ===
From an early age, de Cleyre despised authority and loved liberty; when pressed as to why she considered herself an anarchist, she responded "because I cannot help it". De Cleyre believed that the state was unable to solve poverty, and even contributed to worsening it. She saw anarchism as a means to change social conditions by establishing freedom and abolishing authority over individuals, a common cause she noted across all anarchist schools of thought. Her anarchist philosophy was deeply influence by her own experiences with poverty and chronic illness, which Crispin Sartwell argued to have encouraged her empathy towards others who were suffering. Empathy was at the centre of de Cleyre's anarchist philosophy, as she encouraged mutual solidarity based on a shared experience of suffering under capitalism and hoped anarchism could establish freedom from suffering. She upheld direct action and warned against abstract "theory-spinning", which she worried had made anarchists slow to act to improve existing material conditions. She was inspired by the example of the Paris Commune, during which revolutionaries had seized control of the local government, but believed it had failed because it had been the work of a small revolutionary minority without a mass base and because those revolutionaries had upheld the private property rights of their own adversaries.

De Cleyre's anarchism held that all individuals be free to live a "normal life", and proposed a stateless society based on a combination of self-ownership and the common ownership of basic necessities, natural resources and the means of production. In a society without a rule of law, de Cleyre believed that a federative network of voluntary associations would form the basis for mutual cooperation on issues such as production, communication, education, regulation and defense. She proposed that these arrangements would be malleable and constantly self-adjusting. She envisioned the replacement of nations with a vast network of small, self-reliant communities, in which all natural resources were held in common and workers had control over locally-based production, without large commercialised supply chains. She believed that a free society would exist in harmony with nature, and would therefore entail an end to urbanisation and a back-to-the-land movement. But she was not entirely opposed to industrialization, instead focusing her criticisms of industrialism on the exploitation of labor, the overproduction of commodities and the militarism and political repression she considered inherent to industrialized capitalism.

De Cleyre rejected the supposition that anarchism was an inherently violent or foreign ideology, instead upholding a peaceful approach to anarchism that was in keeping with American revolutionary traditions of self-governance and decentralization. She was deeply influenced by the anti-statist political philosophy of the classical liberals Thomas Paine and Thomas Jefferson, and especially the radical William Godwin, who she admired for his opposition to marriage and support for social welfare. She also drew influence from the mutualist economists Josiah Warren, who defended individual sovereignty and proposed a way to establish a free society by regulating commerce, and Pierre-Joseph Proudhon, who defined liberty as "the mother of order". Proudhon's belief that private property resulted from theft was particularly influential on de Cleyre, who often criticised the institution of private property for dispossessing workers of what they themselves had produced. De Cleyre placed Proudhon within the American anti-governmentalist tradition, within which she drew a line from Jefferson to the transcendentalists Ralph Waldo Emerson and Henry David Thoreau. She also admired the anarchist principles of Walt Whitman, although she was less impressed with his prose, preferring the romantic writings of Lord Byron and Percy Bysshe Shelley. De Cleyre saw herself as part of an anarchist "community of writers", finding anarchist tendencies within the literary works of writers such as Henrik Ibsen, Émile Zola and Walter Scott.

Among the classical anarchists, de Cleyre was the most greatly inspired by Peter Kropotkin's emphasis on an ethical and scientific basis for anarchism. She was also influenced by the anti-theist and anti-statist philosophy of Mikhail Bakunin, which reached her indirectly through her studies of the Haymarket anarchists and Benjamin Tucker's publication Liberty. Although she never directly credited Bakunin for his influence on her, by the turn of the 20th century, she also moved closer to anarcho-syndicalism, which drew from Bakunin's conception of trade unions as a nucleus for a post-revolutionary social order. She also echoed his criticisms of the "dual oppression" by church and state, calling for the abolition of both. De Cleyre saw anarchism as a means to finally break away from "two thousand years of Christian ascetism". Despite her own personal hostility to religion for disregarding people's material needs, she came to believe that a version of it - such as that advocated by Leo Tolstoy - was compatible with anarchism.

=== Anarchist economics ===
After being driven towards anarchism by the Haymarket affair, de Cleyre was initially drawn to the individualist anarchism of Benjamin Tucker. After briefly labelling herself as an individualist in debate with communist anarchists, she later became alienated by individualist proposals for enforcing private property rights through a small state with private police. She aligned herself closer with Dyer Lum's mutualism, which put greater emphasis on workers' organizations, and criticised Tucker's lack of connection with the organized labor movement.

She came to consider herself to be an anarchist without adjectives, rejecting qualifying economic labels, as she was more interested in changing social conditions and believed that free economic experimentation ought to be upheld. She believed that no future anarchist society would comply with prescriptive proposals from the present day, and that the establishment of liberty would give way to new forms of economics not yet imagined by thinkers in what she considered an unfree society. She therefore called for anarchists to prioritise their agitation for the conditions of liberty, including the abolition of government and private property, and to leave aside debates over hypothetical systems. To her, internecine conflicts over economic ideology resembled Christian schisms between "inquisitors" and "heretics".

She recognized that all forms of anarchism were united by an opposition to authority and support for decentralization, voluntary agreement and free association. In her analysis of the different schools of anarchist economics, de Cleyre found that all had started from the basic assumption that no individual held an exclusive right to the exploitation of natural resources, but then disagreed on the property rights that would allow free access to these resources. She believed that this debate centred on which economic arrangements were compatible with individual freedom, noting that while individualist anarchism upheld private property and commodity exchange, anarchist communism emphasised workers' self-management and needs-based resource distribution, collectivist anarchism maintained contribution-based resource distribution, and mutualism proposed distribution be managed by a trade union federation.

She was critical of each of these economic ideologies. Drawing from anarchist-communist critiques of individualism, she opposed the individualist defense of competition as a boon to industrialisation, as she believed that local economies ought to be developed rather than creating large complex supply chains. She criticised socialist and individualist anarchists for their respective beliefs that the state arose solely from material conditions or religious developments, holding that the origins of the state actually involved a synthesis of the two positions. She also mocked communist schemes for a planned economy based on a statistical understanding of supply and demand. Although Leonard Abbott and Emma Goldman respectively misidentified her as an individualist anarchist and a communist anarchist, she took a middle ground between the two positions, criticising both the egocentrism of individualism and the statist tendencies of communism. She worried that both individualist and communist economic proposals had the potential to destroy individual liberty.

=== Feminism ===
Alongside Emma Goldman, de Cleyre was one of the main figures of anarchist feminism at the turn of the century in the United States. They advocated for the abolition of gender roles, which they saw as an extension of political authority into the personal domain, and for the establishment of women's self-determination. De Cleyre rejected the idea that gender roles were natural, pointing out that they were products of socialization, where girls were prohibited from exhibiting masculine behavior and vice versa.

De Cleyre's feminist writings confronted issues that most mainstream feminists of her time ignored, such as women's sexuality, economic independence and patriarchal family structures. She rejected the institutions of marriage and the nuclear family, which she saw as inherently oppressive to women, as it positioned women as subservient to and dependent on men. She also rejected the concept of women's "natural rights", calling instead for women to empower themselves, stand up and fight for gender equality. She also believed that, if material conditions changed so that poverty were eliminated, gender inequality would in turn disappear. Her radical feminism was influenced by her own experiences with an unintended pregnancy, which led her to decentre motherhood from womanhood and instead emphasise women's individual desires.

To de Cleyre, the Church and State both played central roles in the oppression of women. She held that the former taught that women are inherently inferior, while the latter prohibited women from discussing issues such as marital rape through obscenity laws and prevented women from achieving economic independence by protecting monopoly capitalism and wage labor. She believed that free love could help women overcome the limitations of traditional gender roles and patriarchal domination, by centring their own bodily autonomy. She was highly critical of male anarchists who paid lip service to gender equality while upholding their own patriarchal authority over their wives and children.

=== Freethought ===
According to Eugenia DeLamotte, de Cleyre was among "the most angry and blasphemous" of the freethinkers of her time. De Cleyre defined freethought as an evidence-based belief system. She was a staunch opponent of the Christian Church, influenced by her time spent in a Catholic convent as a child, which had initially led her to reject superstition, embrace freethought and advocate for the separation of church and state. She would later go beyond this position to advocate for the outright rejection of both the church and the state. She entered the freethought movement at a time of heightened puritanism, when advocating against religion presented a genuine physical danger to her and other freethinking activists. Inspired by freethinking women such as Mary Wollstonecraft, Frances Wright, Lucretia Mott, Elizabeth Cady Stanton and Matilda Joslyn Gage, de Cleyre broke from her religious education and "buried her past self". She also admired her mentor Dyer Lum's story of his own break with religion, which she portrayed in terms of direct action, with Lum rapidly settling his questions of religion without any prolonged period of suffering.

Pointing out the influence that parents had on their child's early intellectual development, which often resulted in the indoctrination of religious ideas, she emphasised the importance of teaching children critical thinking. Worried that religion exerted a negative influence on critical thinking, she called for the creation of a secular education system and warned of the growing power of the Catholic Church. De Cleyre herself came to believe that the "God-Idea" presented an inherent danger to society, as it was used to suppress liberty and women's rights. She instead called for people to embrace rationalism and the scientific method; to de Cleyre, truth results from freedom, rather than force. She rejected the institutions of the church, state and marriage as authoritarian, considering them to be analogous to slavery. To de Cleyre, "the fiend, Authority" ought to be opposed in both its clerical and secular forms. She even applied freethinking methods to critique freethinking itself, calling on freethinkers to extend their ideas to their logical conclusions, which she believed to be atheism, anti-authoritarianism and anti-capitalism. Drawing from Wollstonecraft, de Cleyre argued against the existing social order, citing its preservation of gender inequality and class stratification. She thus saw anarchism, freethought and feminism as "inextricably intertwined".

Drawing from the work of Thomas Paine, she attacked belief in gods in her essays and poetry. She synthesised rationalism with romanticism in her work, substituting worship of a deity with the worship of nature, and upholding what she saw as the moral imperative of contributing to others' happiness. Although de Cleyre rejected religion on an intellectual level, she recognized the emotional power it held and described humanity as religion's "beating heart". She praised Thomas Paine for expressing a form of religiosity that offended both religious orthodoxy and anti-theist philosophy, and warned against any rejection of religion that led to egocentrism and a loss of the "selfless devotion" that religion inspired. She saw the goal of freethought as "being what we teach", and living in accordance with her ideals.

De Cleyre criticised Christian morality for providing what she saw as an insufficient solution to suffering, which she believed could be alleviated through material action and compassion rather than transcendental ideas of peace and salvation. She believed that the universe functioned according to natural law, without any divine intervention or afterlife. She was fiercely critical of the New Testament, which she called a "garbage heap" that mixed together some of humanity's "most beautiful" and "most repellant" stories. She often used her own personal knowledge of the Bible to her advantage, quoting from scripture to point out how far she believed Christian practice had strayed from Jesus' own teachings and to invoke retribution for attacks against civil liberties. De Cleyre claimed Jesus to have been a proto-anarchist, citing his defiance of the state, his opposition to private property and his distribution of bread to the hungry. However, she ultimately condemned Christianity for its fundamental belief in a "supreme authority", which she considered to be at odds with her own anarchist philosophy. She saw the religion as a way to justify poverty and unnecessary suffering, and contrasted it with anarchism's quest for material abundance and social equality.

=== Libertarianism ===
De Cleyre believed that each historical era had a "dominant idea" that people adhered to, and that in her own period in time, this dominant idea was economic materialism or "Thing-Worship". In counterposition to this, she upheld individuals' free will and moral responsibility to commit themselves to their own ideals. She also accepted the influence that material conditions had on people's actions, and while she believed each person was responsible for their own actions, she rejected retributive justice as a solution to criminal behavior, instead proposing the abolition of poverty as a way to solve crime. She was also a fierce advocate of freedom of speech, speaking out against censorship and defending people from political repression even when she disagreed with what they had to say. De Cleyre was committed to what poet Franklin Rosemont called "wild freedom".

== Legacy ==
=== Tributes ===
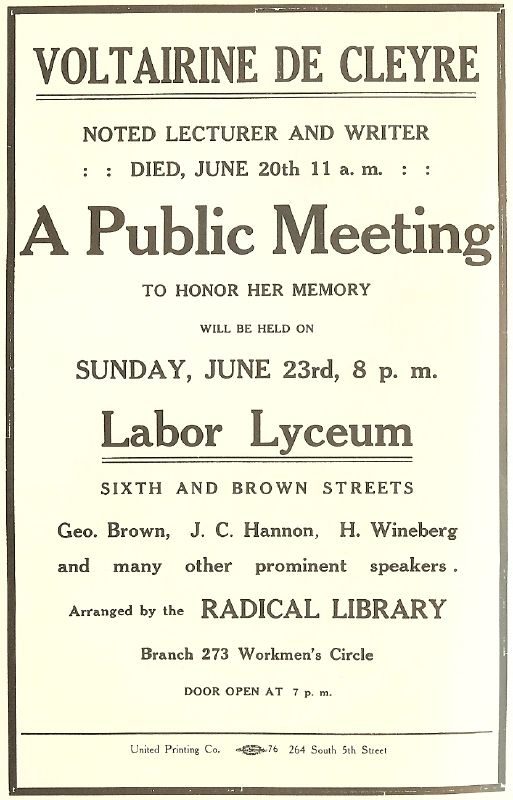
A flyer advertising a memorial event held a few days after de Cleyre's death

De Cleyre was eulogised in Regeneración and Mother Earth. Emma Goldman said that de Cleyre was "beautiful in her spiritual defiance and filled with the revolt of a flaming ideal". Jay Fox said that "her memory will linger long, like the odor of a fragrant rose crushed at full bloom". From Glasgow, her friend Will Duff wrote that she was "tombed in the true hearts that loved [her] well". Tributes to her were also written for a memorial issue of Mother Earth by Alexander Berkman. German anarcho-syndicalist Rudolf Rocker called her "one of the most wonderful women that America has given the world". German anarchist historian Max Nettlau called her "the pearl of Anarchy" who shone with "libertarian feeling and artistic beauty". Romanian-American anarchist Marcus Graham said she was "the most thoughtful woman anarchist" of her century.

Her nurse Annie Livshis compiled a memorial collection of her poems, portrait and favorite song, and sent her fur hat to her mother with a letter of appreciation. Later in 1912, de Cleyre's friends, led by Alexander Berkman, formed a committee to collect and publish her writings. Berkman's own Prison Memoirs, which de Cleyre helped edit, was published after her death. Berkman returned the favor by editing her own writings into a collection of Selected Works, which was published by Mother Earth in 1914. Her son Harry de Cleyre treated her Selected Works as his own personal Bible, praising her for her "stubborn defense of those being oppressed". De Cleyre's mother Harriet also began signing her name as "Harriet de Cleyre", in tribute to her late daughter.

In her biography of de Cleyre, Emma Goldman described her as the "most gifted and brilliant Anarchist woman America ever produced". Goldman considered her biography of de Cleyre to be among her best work, although it was later found to have included a number of factual errors and distortions. When Goldman died, according to her wishes, she was buried near de Cleyre and the Haymarket anarchists at Waldheim Cemetery. On the anniversary of de Cleyre's death, memorial meetings were held in cities throughout the United States. George Edwards set her poem "The Hurricane" to music, Leonard Abbott cited her in his lecture series on radical literature, and her poems were regularly recited at the Ferrer Colony.

=== Influence ===
A. J. Brigati considered de Cleyre to be among the most influential figures of the freethought movement. American politician Leonard Abbott placed her alongside Louise Michel and Emma Goldman, who he considered to be "the three great anarchist women of modern times". Libertarian feminist scholar Sharon Presley considered de Cleyre's feminist writings to be among her "most important theoretical contributions", noting how many of her views anticipated contemporary feminist arguments on gender roles and institutional oppression. Her radical feminist philosophy paved the way for many aspects of second-wave feminism, including the writings of Shulamith Firestone. Her views on prison abolition, her criticism of grading in education and her analysis of American interventionism also preceded other popular political positions of the 21st century. Eugenia DeLamotte believed de Cleyre to be the "most radical, revolutionary feminist" of her time, and emphasised her work's importance to modern literary analysis, feminist theory and progressive politics.

Already in the 1930s, Emma Goldman remarked that de Cleyre's life and work "had little influence in America, which of course did not speak against her. It was due to her personality as it was hard for her to get out of her shell". Goldman regretted that, after de Cleyre's death, no prominent American public figure had taken up anarchism as their "life's goal". She thought that the lack of public figures was responsible for the stagnation of the anarchist movement. George Brown thought that "had [de Cleyre] done the same work in some popular cause, she would have been famous and the world would have acclaimed her, as I believe her to have been, the greatest woman America has produced".

=== Historical recognition ===
Compared with other leading figures in American anarchism and feminism, de Cleyre has received relatively little scholarly attention. Many historians of classical anarchism neglected to give her attention, others perpetuated factual errors and myths about her, and even Max Nettlau's work on her has been obscure or unpublished. Her work was also largely neglected from collections of anarchist and feminist works, with only her essay "Anarchism and American Traditions" receiving attention from documentarians. Historian Paul Avrich attributed this scholarly neglect to her short life, which ended before the major events of the early 20th century. She was also neglected in histories of first-wave feminism, which according to Catherine Helen Palczewski, was due to her radical opposition to traditional gender roles. Her work has also been left out from the canon of American literature.

Paul Avrich's 1978 book An American Anarchist has been credited as one of the main contributions to scholarship about de Cleyre, who, as of the early 21st century, remained largely unstudied in academic circles. This was followed by a biography from Margaret Marsh, and examinations of de Cleyre's contribution to feminism by Catherine Palczewski and Wendy McElroy. In 2004, A. J. Brigati edited and published the first modern collection of her work, The Voltairine de Cleyre Reader, which included annotations and scholarly analysis of her life and work. In 2005, two more collections of her speeches and articles were published: Exquisite Rebel: The Essays of Voltairine de Cleyre – Anarchist, Feminist, Genius, edited by Sharon Presley and Crispin Sartwell and published by SUNY Press, and Gates of Freedom: Voltairine de Cleyre and the Revolution of the Mind, from University of Michigan Press. Eugenia DeLamotte wrote that, due to de Cleyre's relative obscurity in American literary historiography, "everyone who writes on de Cleyre has the privilege of retelling once again [...] the story of her life.".

== Selected works ==
=== Essays ===
- "Secular Education" (The Truth Seeker, December 3, 1887)
- "The Drama of the Nineteenth Century" (Pittsburgh, December 16, 1888)
- "The Economic Tendency of Freethought" (Liberty, February 15, 1890)
- "Dyer D. Lum" (Freedom, June 1893)
- "In Defense of Emma Goldman and the Right of Expropriation" (New York, December 16, 1893)
- "Sex Slavery" (Philadelphia, 1895)
- "The Case of Woman Versus Orthodoxy" (Boston Investigator, 1896)
- "The Gateway to Freedom" (Free Society, March 24, 1901)
- "The Eleventh of November, 1887" (Free Society, November 24, 1901)
- "A Rocket of Iron" (Free Society, January 5, 1902)
- "Crime and Punishment" (Philadelphia, March 5, 1903)
- "The Making of an Anarchist" (The Independent, September 24, 1903)
- "McKinley's Assassination: From the Anarchist Standpoint" (Mother Earth, October 1907)
- "Those Who Marry Do Ill" (Mother Earth, January 1908)
- "Why I am an Anarchist" (Mother Earth, March 1908)
- "Our Present Attitude" (Mother Earth, April 1908)
- "Anarchism and American Traditions" (Mother Earth, December 1908)
- "The Dominant Idea" (Mother Earth, May 1910)
- "Modern Educational Reform" (New York, October 1910)
- "Francisco Ferrer" (Mother Earth, 1911)
- "The Mexican Revolt" (Mother Earth, August 1911)
- "Direct Action" (Mother Earth, January 1912)
- "Report of the Work of the Chicago Mexican Defense League" (Mother Earth, April 1912)
- "The Heart of Angiolillo" (Mother Earth, 1912)
- "The Woman Question" (Herald of Revolt, September 1913)

=== Poetry ===
- "The Burial of My Past Self" (1885)
- "The Christian's Faith" (1887)
- "The Freethinker's Plea" (1887)
- "The Hurricane" (Sea Isle City, New Jersey, August 1889)
- "Ut Sementem Feceris, Ita Metes" (Philadelphia, February 1890)
- "Bastard Born" (Enterprise, Kansas, January 1891)
- "Mary Wollstonecraft" (Philadelphia, April 27, 1893)
- "Light Upon Waldehim" (London, October 1897)
- "Written-in-Red (To Our Living Dead in Mexico's Struggle)" (Regeneración, December 16, 1911)

== See also ==
- Bill Haywood
- Eugene V. Debs
- Henry David Thoreau
- Rachelle Yarros
- The writing on the wall, which influenced de Cleyre's Written in Red

== Bibliography ==
- Avrich, Paul (1978). An American Anarchist: The Life of Voltairine de Cleyre. Princeton: Princeton University Press. ISBN 978-0-691-04657-0.
- Brigati, A. J. (2004). "Introduction". In Brigati, A. J. (ed.). The Voltairine de Cleyre Reader. Oakland, California: AK Press. pp. vii–x. ISBN 978-1-902593-87-6.
- Campbell, Michelle M. (2012). "The Freedom to Try: Voltairine de Cleyre in Postmodern Pedagogy" (PDF). MidAmerica. XXXIX: 13–23. ISSN 0190-2911.
- Campbell, Michelle M. (2013). "Voltairine de Cleyre and the Anarchist Canon". Anarchist Developments in Cultural Studies. 1: 64–81. ISSN 1923-5615.
- DeLamotte, Eugenia (2004). Gates of Freedom: Voltairine de Cleyre and the Revolution of the Mind. University of Michigan Press. doi:10.3998/mpub.11482. ISBN 0-472-09867-5. JSTOR 10.3998/mpub.11482. LCCN 2004006183.
- Filanti, Rita (2021). ""We must dig our trenches, and win or die": Voltairine de Cleyre's Transnational Anarchism". Transatlantica (2). doi:10.4000/transatlantica.17839.
- Filanti, Rita (2022). ""The question of souls is old—we demand our bodies, now"(1890): Voltairine de Cleyre's Anarchist-Feminism" (PDF). WiN: The EAAS Women's Network Journal (3).
- Golder, Lauren J. (2023). "A Politics of Suffering: Anarchism and Embodiment in the Life of Voltairine de Cleyre". Gender & History. 36 (2): 474–492. doi:10.1111/1468-0424.12678. ISSN 1468-0424.
- Marsh, Margaret S. (1981). "No Illusions: The Anarchist Life of Voltairine de Cleyre". Anarchist Women, 1870–1920. Philadelphia: Temple University Press. pp. 123–150. ISBN 978-0-87722-202-6.
- Palczewski, Catherine Helen (1995). "Voltairine de Cleyre: Sexual Slavery and Sexual Pleasure in the Nineteenth Century". NWSA Journal. 7 (3): 54–68. ISSN 2151-7363. JSTOR 4316402.
- Presley, Sharon (2005a). "The Exquisite Rebel: The Anarchist Life of Voltairine de Cleyre". In Presley, Sharon; Sartwell, Crispin (eds.). Exquisite Rebel: The Essays of Voltairine de Cleyre – Anarchist, Feminist, Genius. Albany: State University of New York Press. pp. 17–26. ISBN 978-0-7914-6094-8.
- Presley, Sharon (2005b). "Emma Goldman's 'Voltairine de Cleyre': A Moving but Flawed Tribute". In Presley, Sharon; Sartwell, Crispin (eds.). Exquisite Rebel: The Essays of Voltairine de Cleyre – Anarchist, Feminist, Genius. Albany: State University of New York Press. pp. 27–28. ISBN 978-0-7914-6094-8.
- Presley, Sharon (2005c). "Loving Freedom: Anarchism without Adjectives". In Presley, Sharon; Sartwell, Crispin (eds.). Exquisite Rebel: The Essays of Voltairine de Cleyre – Anarchist, Feminist, Genius. Albany: State University of New York Press. pp. 47–50. ISBN 978-0-7914-6094-8.
- Presley, Sharon (2005d). "Wild Freedom: A Passion for Liberty and Justice". In Presley, Sharon; Sartwell, Crispin (eds.). Exquisite Rebel: The Essays of Voltairine de Cleyre – Anarchist, Feminist, Genius. Albany: State University of New York Press. pp. 109–110. ISBN 978-0-7914-6094-8.
- Presley, Sharon (2005e). "Neither Gods nor Superstitions: Freethought and Religion". In Presley, Sharon; Sartwell, Crispin (eds.). Exquisite Rebel: The Essays of Voltairine de Cleyre – Anarchist, Feminist, Genius. Albany: State University of New York Press. pp. 161–164. ISBN 978-0-7914-6094-8.
- Presley, Sharon (2005f). "No Authority but Oneself: The Anarchist Feminist Philosophy of Autonomy and Freedom". In Presley, Sharon; Sartwell, Crispin (eds.). Exquisite Rebel: The Essays of Voltairine de Cleyre – Anarchist, Feminist, Genius. Albany: State University of New York Press. pp. 191–194. ISBN 978-0-7914-6094-8.
- Sartwell, Crispin; Presley, Sharon (2005). "Not Another Brick in the Wall: Nonauthoritarian Education". In Presley, Sharon; Sartwell, Crispin (eds.). Exquisite Rebel: The Essays of Voltairine de Cleyre – Anarchist, Feminist, Genius. Albany: State University of New York Press. pp. 247–250. ISBN 978-0-7914-6094-8.
- Sartwell, Crispin (2005a). "Priestess of Pity and Vengeance". In Presley, Sharon; Sartwell, Crispin (eds.). Exquisite Rebel: The Essays of Voltairine de Cleyre – Anarchist, Feminist, Genius. Albany: State University of New York Press. pp. 3–16. ISBN 978-0-7914-6094-8.
- Sartwell, Crispin (2005b). "Breaking the Chains: Changing Society through Direct Action". In Presley, Sharon; Sartwell, Crispin (eds.). Exquisite Rebel: The Essays of Voltairine de Cleyre – Anarchist, Feminist, Genius. Albany: State University of New York Press. pp. 269–270. ISBN 978-0-7914-6094-8.
- Shone, Steve J. (2013). "Voltairine de Cleyre: More of an Anarchist than a Feminist?". American Anarchism. Leiden: Brill. pp. 38–59. doi:10.1163/9789004251953_004. ISBN 9789004251953.
