= Cherry, Illinois =

- Village
- Location of Cherry in Bureau County, Illinois.
- Coordinates: 41°25′41″N 89°12′48″W
- Country: US
- State: Illinois
- County: Bureau
- Township: Westfield
- Named for: James Cherry

Area
  - Total: 0.51 sq mi (1.3 km^{2})
  - Land: 0.51 sq mi (1.3 km^{2})
  - Water: 0.00 sq mi (0 km^{2})
- Elevation: 679 ft (207 m)

Population (2020)
  - Total: 435
  - Density: 850/sq mi (330/km^{2})
- Time zone: UTC-6 (CST)
  - Summer (DST): UTC-5 (CDT)
- ZIP Code(s): 61317
- Area codes: 815 & 779
- FIPS code: 17-12970
- GNIS feature ID: 2397610

Cherry is a village in Bureau County, Illinois, United States. The population was 435 at the 2020 census. It is part of the Ottawa Micropolitan Statistical Area. It is located northwest of LaSalle-Peru, just a few miles north of Interstate 80, and is about 75 miles (121 km) east of the Quad Cities.

Cherry was the site of the Cherry Mine Disaster, which killed 259 coal miners in November 1909. This was the third most deadly mine disaster in U.S. history (as of 2024).

== History ==
Cherry was founded as a mining site. It was named after James Cherry, superintendent of the St. Paul Mining Company.

The St. Paul Coal Company sank a shaft at the Cherry Mine in 1905. The mine supplied coal for Chicago, Milwaukee and St. Paul Railroad locomotives, and was named for the first mine superintendent, James Cherry. The Cherry Mine Disaster occurred in 1909, and remains one of the worst coal mining disasters in United States history. The disaster led to changes in US and Illinois mining and labor regulations, as well as enforcement of child labor laws and the requirement in Illinois that mines have fire fighting equipment and more fireproof materials. Cherry Coal Company took over operations from 1929 until 1935 when it closed.

== Geography ==
According to the 2021 census gazetteer files, Cherry has a total area of 0.51 square miles (1.32 km^{2}), all land.

== Demographics ==
Historical population
Census	Pop.	Note	%±
1910	1,048		—
1920	1,265		20.7%
1930	636		−49.7%
1940	583		−8.3%
1950	520		−10.8%
1960	501		−3.7%
1970	551		10.0%
1980	541		−1.8%
1990	487		−10.0%
2000	509		4.5%
2010	482		−5.3%
2020	435		−9.8%
U.S. Decennial Census

As of the 2020 census there were 435 people, 208 households, and 144 families residing in the village. The population density was 846.30 inhabitants per square mile (326.76/km^{2}). There were 218 housing units at an average density of 424.12 per square mile (163.75/km^{2}). The racial makeup of the village was 95.86% White, 0.46% African American, 1.15% Asian, 0.69% from other races, and 1.84% from two or more races. Hispanic or Latino of any race were 5.06% of the population.

There were 208 households, out of which 24.5% had children under the age of 18 living with them, 61.06% were married couples living together, 2.88% had a female householder with no husband present, and 30.77% were non-families. 27.40% of all households were made up of individuals, and 13.46% had someone living alone who was 65 years of age or older. The average household size was 2.83 and the average family size was 2.30.

The village's age distribution consisted of 21.9% under the age of 18, 7.9% from 18 to 24, 18.4% from 25 to 44, 20.1% from 45 to 64, and 31.7% who were 65 years of age or older. The median age was 49.9 years. For every 100 females, there were 125.9 males. For every 100 females age 18 and over, there were 113.7 males.

The median income for a household in the village was $49,583, and the median income for a family was $52,857. Males had a median income of $41,000 versus $27,813 for females. The per capita income for the village was $27,386. About 2.1% of families and 3.8% of the population were below the poverty line, including 8.7% of those under age 18 and 2.6% of those age 65 or over.
