= Westfield Township, Bureau County, Illinois =

Westfield Township
- Township
- Location in Bureau County

- Bureau County's location in Illinois
- Coordinates: 41°27′34″N 89°13′20″W
- Country: United States
- State: Illinois
- County: Bureau
- Established: November 6, 1849

Area
  - Total: 34.74 sq mi (90.0 km^{2})
  - Land: 34.73 sq mi (90.0 km^{2})
  - Water: 0.01 sq mi (0.026 km^{2}) 0.03%
- Elevation: 699 ft (213 m)

Population (2020)
  - Total: 874
  - Density: 25.2/sq mi (9.72/km^{2})
- Time zone: UTC-6 (CST)
  - Summer (DST): UTC-5 (CDT)
- ZIP codes: 61312, 61317, 61330
- FIPS code: 17-011-80268

Westfield Township is one of twenty-five townships in Bureau County, Illinois, USA. As of the 2020 census, its population was 874 and it contained 421 housing units.

== Geography ==
According to the 2010 census, the township has a total area of 34.74 square miles (90.0 km^{2}), of which 34.73 square miles (90.0 km^{2}) (or 99.97%) is land and 0.01 square miles (0.026 km^{2}) (or 0.03%) is water.

=== Villages ===
- Arlington
- Cherry

=== Cemeteries ===
- Arlington
- Bereans
- Calvery Catholic
- Cherry Miner's
- Lost Grove

=== Major highways ===
- Illinois Route 89

=== Airports and landing strips ===
- Funfsinn Airport
- Gerald H Hamer Airport
- Hahn Airport

== Demographics ==
As of the 2020 census there were 874 people, 368 households, and 267 families residing in the township. The population density was 25.16 inhabitants per square mile (9.71/km^{2}). There were 421 housing units at an average density of 12.12 per square mile (4.68/km^{2}). The racial makeup of the township was 94.74% White, 0.57% African American, 0.00% Native American, 0.92% Asian, 0.00% Pacific Islander, 0.92% from other races, and 2.86% from two or more races. Hispanic or Latino of any race were 3.89% of the population.

There were 368 households, out of which 26.10% had children under the age of 18 living with them, 64.95% were married couples living together, 4.08% had a female householder with no spouse present, and 27.45% were non-families. 23.40% of all households were made up of individuals, and 11.40% had someone living alone who was 65 years of age or older. The average household size was 2.49 and the average family size was 2.98.

The township's age distribution consisted of 22.2% under the age of 18, 6.9% from 18 to 24, 20.3% from 25 to 44, 27% from 45 to 64, and 23.7% who were 65 years of age or older. The median age was 45.6 years. For every 100 females, there were 111.5 males. For every 100 females age 18 and over, there were 103.7 males.

The median income for a household in the township was $56,875, and the median income for a family was $71,250. Males had a median income of $42,222 versus $31,071 for females. The per capita income for the township was $29,163. About 6.7% of families and 8.3% of the population were below the poverty line, including 16.6% of those under age 18 and 1.8% of those age 65 or over.

Historical population
| Census | Pop. | Note | %± |
|---|---|---|---|
| 2010 | 941 | | — |
| 2020 | 874 | | −7.1% |
US Decennial Census

== School districts ==
- La Moille Community Unit School District 303
- Mendota Elementary School District 289
- Mendota High School District 280

== Political districts ==
- Illinois's 11th congressional district
- State House District 76
- State Senate District 38
