= 1909 Cherry Mine disaster =

Fire in Cherry, Illinois, US

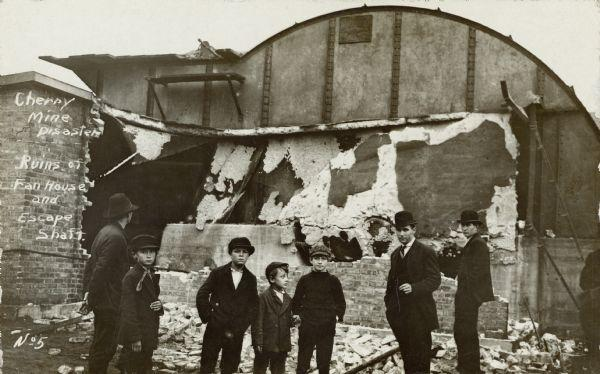
- This postcard shows the ruins of the fan building – with the semicircular roof – as a result of the Cherry Mine disaster
- Date: November 13, 1909
- Location: Cherry, Illinois, USA; 41.426667°N 89.2125°W
- Cause: Coal Mine fire
- Deaths: 259

The Cherry Mine disaster was a fire which occurred at the Cherry Mine, a coal mine outside Cherry, Illinois, on November 13, 1909. The fire, which killed 259 men and boys as well as three dozen mules, is the third most deadly mine disaster in American coal mining history.

== History ==
=== Background ===
In 1905, the St. Paul Coal Company opened the Cherry Mine in order to supply coal for the trains of its controlling company, the Chicago, Milwaukee & St. Paul Railroad. The mine consisted of three horizontal veins, each deeper than the last. The veins were connected vertically by two shafts set some 100 yards (91 m) apart. Both the main shaft and the secondary shaft contained wooden stairs and ladders. The main shaft was capped by an 85-foot (26 m) steel tipple which controlled a mechanical hoisting cage. A large fan, located in a shunt off the secondary shaft, pushed fresh air into the mine.

The miners included a large number of immigrants, heavily Italian, many of whom could not speak English. Boys as young as 11 years old also worked the mine. Rather than a fixed per-hour wage, pay was based on the coal production.

== The Cherry Mine Disaster ==
On Saturday, November 13, 1909, nearly 500 men and boys as well as three dozen mules were working in the mine. An electrical outage earlier that week had forced the workers to light kerosene lanterns and torches. Some were portable, and some were set into the mine walls. Shortly after noon, a coal car filled with hay for the mules caught fire from one of the wall lanterns. The fire went unnoticed by workers for 45 minutes before efforts to move the fire began; however, the workers only succeeded in spreading the fire to the mine's support timbers.

The mine's large fan was reversed in an attempt to blow out the fire, but this only succeeded in igniting the fan house itself as well as the escape ladders and stairs in the secondary shaft, trapping more miners below. The two shafts were then closed off to smother the fire, but this had the effect of both cutting off oxygen to the miners and allowing the “black damp,” a suffocating mixture of carbon dioxide and nitrogen, to build up in the mine.

Some 200 men and boys made their way to the surface, some through escape shafts, some using the hoisting cage. Some miners who had already escaped returned to the mine to aid their coworkers. Twelve of these, led by John Bundy, made six dangerous cage trips, rescuing many others. The seventh trip, however, proved fatal when the cage operator misunderstood the miners' signals and brought them to the surface too late - the rescuers and those they attempted to rescue were burned to death.

One group of miners trapped in the mine built a makeshift wall to protect themselves from the fire and poisonous gases. Although without food, they were able to drink from a pool of water leaking from a coal seam, moving deeper into the mine to escape the black damp. Eight days later, the 21 survivors, known as the "eight day men", tore down the wall and made their way through the mine in search of more water, but came across a rescue party instead. One of those 21 survivors died two days later with complications from asthma.

=== Aftermath ===
In 1910, the Illinois legislature established stronger mine safety regulations as a result of the Cherry Mine Disaster. In 1911, Illinois passed a separate law which later developed into the Illinois Workmen's Compensation Act.

A monument to those who lost their lives was erected on May 15, 1971, by the Illinois Department of Transportation and the Illinois State Historical Society. The centennial commemoration of the Cherry Mine disaster was held in Cherry from November 14 to November 15, 2009. A new monument, located at the Cherry Village Hall, was dedicated to the miners who lost their lives in the disaster.

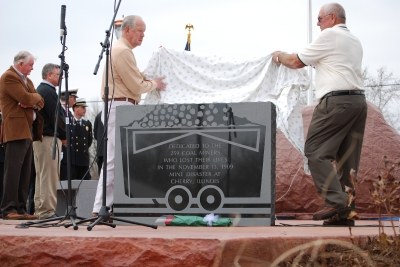
Memorial to the Cherry Mine disaster unveiled in November 2009

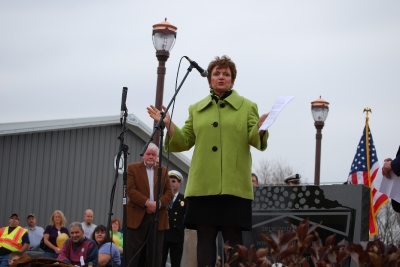
Rep. Debbie Halvorson speaks at the unveiling of the Cherry Mine disaster memorial in November 2009

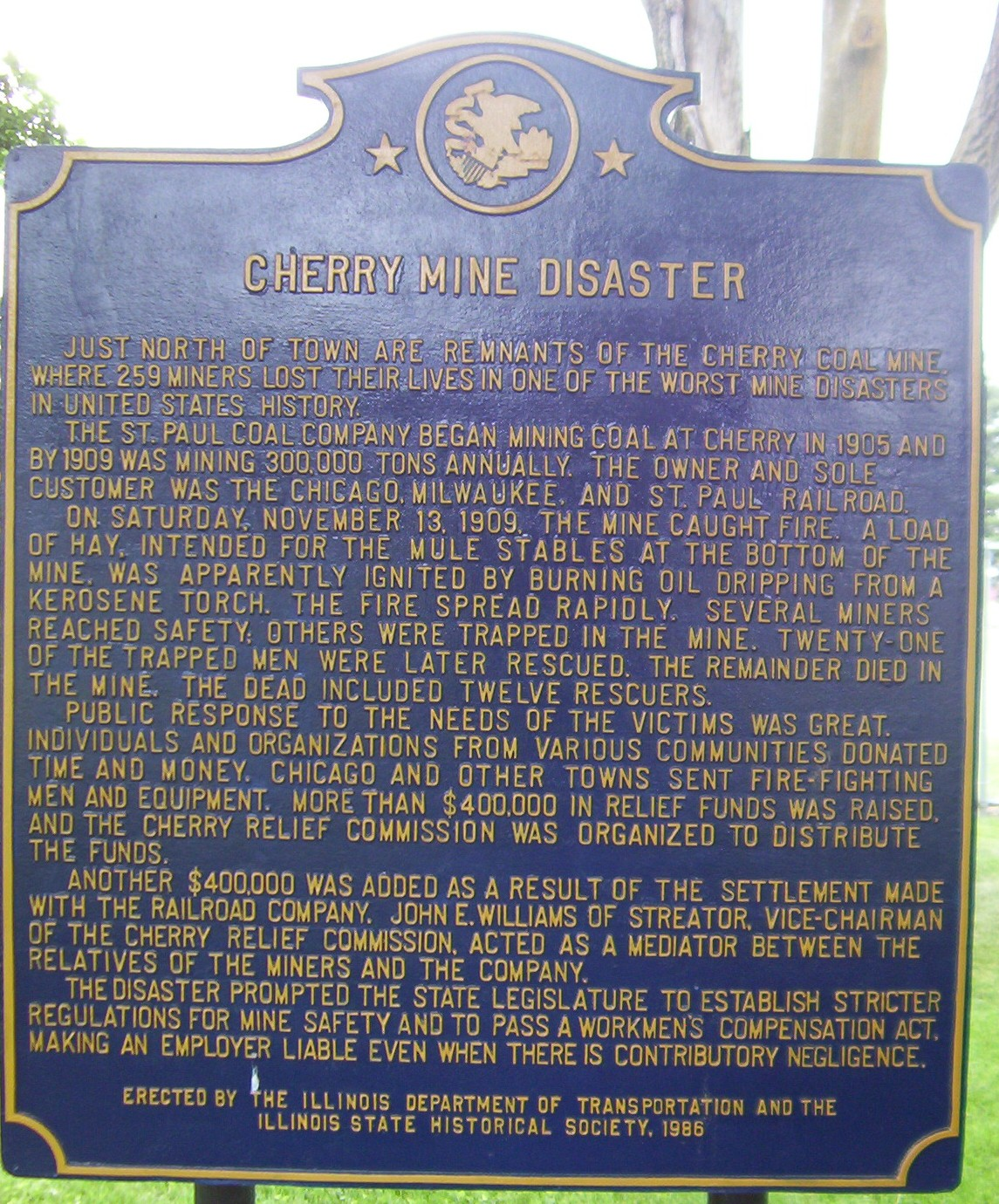
Cherry Mine disaster historical marker
