= Sex Slavery (essay) =

1890 essay by Voltairine de Cleyre

- Author: Voltairine de Cleyre
- Genre: Political philosophy, anarcha-feminism
- Publication date: 1890
- Publication place: United States of America
- Text: Sex Slavery (essay) at Wikisource

Sex Slavery is an anarcha-feminist essay written by Voltairine de Cleyre in 1890. A reaction to the imprisonment of Moses Harman for criticizing marital rape, de Cleyre developed her concept of "sexual slavery", exploring the role of sexual and reproductive rights within patriarchy, among other topics.

This work was one of the earliest to examine the institutional mechanisms of patriarchy. Additionally, de Cleyre opposed certain positions held by Emma Goldman regarding the roles and aspirations of women. Due to its innovative nature and the depth of its reflections, it is considered a major work of anarcha-feminist thought.

== History ==
After criticizing marital rape in the press, Moses Harman was arrested under the Comstock Laws, which prohibited the publication of "obscene" material. De Cleyre responded to this incarceration by publishing this work. She wrote the text in 1890.

== Contents ==
Influenced by Proudhon's thought, she adopted the idea that women were a kind of "proletariat of men" but expanded on this with a reflection on the elements that enslaved women. These included marriage laws, paternal rights, reproductive rights, and more. The work was one of the earliest texts to focus on the institutional mechanisms of patriarchy.

The author opposed some of the ideas advocated by Goldman, particularly on the subject of marriage, which she did not see as a situation that could be happy and passionate. She also disagreed with Goldman on the notion of an "inherent desire to be mothers" that women were said to feel and rejected these positions. In one of the essay's striking passages, de Cleyre declared:

Yes, for that is adultery where a woman submits herself sexually to a man, without desire on her part, for the sake of “keeping him virtuous,” “keeping him at home,” the women say.
(Well, if a man did not love me and respect himself enough to be “virtuous” without prostituting me, he might go, and welcome. He has no virtue to keep.)
And that is rape, where a man forces himself sexually upon a woman, whether he is licensed by the marriage law to do it or not.

== Legacy ==
The work and the theories developed within it establish de Cleyre as one of the major figures and greatest theorists of the anarcha-feminist movement.
