= Sharon Presley =

American libertarian feminist (1943–2022)

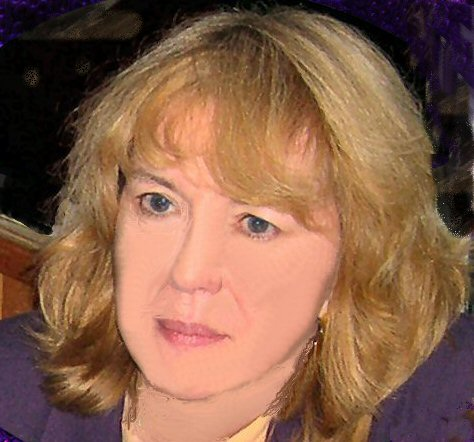
- Sharon Presley
- Born: March 23, 1943
- Died: October 31, 2022 (aged 79)
- Education: City University of New York
- Known for: Writer, libertarian feminism

Sharon Presley (March 23, 1943 – October 31, 2022) was an American libertarian feminist, writer, activist, and lecturer in psychology.

== Education and work ==
Presley received a B.A. in psychology from the University of California, Berkeley, and an M.A. in psychology from San Francisco State. In 1981, she received a Ph.D. in social psychology from City University of New York. Between 1982 and her retirement in 2009, she had a succession of instructor, adjunct, and visiting, positions at thirteen different schools, including California State University, East Bay where she was a lecturer. According to Rebecca Klatch, much of Presley's research focuses on "issues of power, obedience, and resistance to authority".

== Activism ==
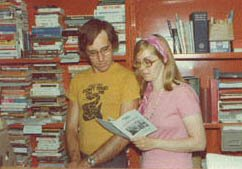
Muller and Presley at Laissez Faire Books

Presley was apolitical until she read Ayn Rand at the age of nineteen. She was radicalized when her boyfriend, who was leader of the Cal Conservatives for Political Action, was arrested in Berkeley, California. She joined the Free Speech Movement, Students Opposed to Conscription, and the Alliance of Libertarian Activists (ALA).

In 1972, Presley helped owner John Muller launch Laissez Faire Books, a libertarian store in Greenwich Village, New York. She worked on promotional materials there until 1977. Presley was a founder of the Association of Libertarian Feminists (ALF). In the mid-1970s, Presley was the national coordinator, then later became the executive director for ALF.

== Views ==
In 1982, Presley and Lynn Kinsky wrote that government laws and regulations had created a crisis in child care due to the restrictions in zoning, licensing, and health and safety regulations. In 2013, Presley said that libertarian feminism is not different from mainstream feminism except in the unwillingness of libertarians to resort to government solutions to social problems. She said she prefers "a hand up" from private sources such as mutual aid societies "rather than a handout" from government. Earlier in 1980, she said that libertarian feminists "don't believe in seeking government solutions to women's problems".

Presley rejected the view that transgender women are not women, or that they should not take part in the feminist dialogue. She maintained that transgender people should be judged on their merits, like other people. Presley once stated, "Depending on distant bureaucracies run by white men who have no understanding has been problematic for women; there is no reason to assume that trans people will be any better served by those bureaucracies. Presley believed that the government should not subsidize abortion for the poor, nor make any laws limiting or banning abortion; she maintained that abortion should be available as a choice. Likewise, she believed that birth control pills should not be subject to government subsidy or restriction.

Presley contended that the government should not make any laws regarding prostitution. She also opined that the customers of prostitutes should not be prosecuted. In this regard, Presley differs from feminists who wish to restrict prostitution. She maintained that, despite the general agreement among feminists that violent pornography is degrading to women, there should be no government laws limiting such pornography, which she describes as a symptom of a societal problem. Instead, she suggested that the problem's cause should be identified and treated with education. She disagreed with Susan Brownmiller that anti-obscenity laws would solve the problem.

In her 2010 self-help book, Standing Up to Experts and Authorities: How to Avoid Being Intimidated, Manipulated, and Abused, Presley cited scholarly studies to describe how people may unknowingly disengage their critical thinking in the face of apparent authority. This reaction masks the possibility that the authority's assertions may be challenged. Presley gave the reader pointers on how to overcome their initial reaction and regain a calm and assertive footing.

== Death ==
Presley died on October 31, 2022, after struggling with various health issues.

== Selected bibliography ==
=== Books ===
- Presley, Sharon; Kinsky, Lynn (1982). "Government Is Women's Enemy". In McElroy, Wendy (ed.). Freedom, Feminism, and the State: An Overview of Individualist Feminism. Paul Avrich Collection (Library of Congress). Washington, DC: Cato Institute. ISBN 978-0-932790-32-3. OCLC 8937344 – via Internet Archive.
- Presley, Sharon (1999). "Ayn Rand's Philosophy of Individualism: A Feminist Psychologist's Perspective". In Gladstein, Mimi Reisel; Sciabarra, Chris Matthew (eds.). Feminist Interpretations of Ayn Rand. University Park, Pennsylvania: The Pennsylvania State University Press. pp. 251–273. ISBN 978-0-271-01830-0. OCLC 1310591549 – via Internet Archive.
- de Cleyre, Voltairine (2005). Presley, Sharon; Sartwell, Crispin (eds.). Exquisite Rebel: The Essays of Voltairine de Cleyre — Feminist, Anarchist, Genius. Albany: State University of New York Press. ISBN 978-1-4237-4860-1. OCLC 1091017127 – via Internet Archive.
- Presley, Sharon (2010). Standing Up to Experts and Authorities: How to Avoid Being Intimidated, Manipulated, and Abused. New York, New York: Solomon Press. ISBN 978-0-934623-87-2. OCLC 694395027.

=== Ph.D thesis ===
- Presley, Sharon (1982). Values and attitudes of political resisters to authority (Ph.D thesis). New York, New York: City University of New York. OCLC 313314438.
