= Crispin Sartwell =

American philosopher

- Born: 20 June 1958 (age 68)

Academic background
- Education: University of Maryland, College Park (BA); Johns Hopkins University (MA); University of Virginia (PhD)
- Doctoral advisor: Richard Rorty

Academic work
- Discipline: Philosophy; Communication; Political science
- Institutions: Dickinson College; Vanderbilt University; University of Alabama; Maryland Institute College of Art; Millersville University of Pennsylvania

Crispin Gallagher Sartwell (born June 20, 1958) is an American academic, philosopher, and journalist who was a faculty member of the philosophy department at Dickinson College in Carlisle, Pennsylvania, until he retired in 2023. He has taught philosophy, communication, and political science at Vanderbilt University, University of Alabama, Millersville University of Pennsylvania, the Maryland Institute College of Art, and Dickinson College.

== Career ==
As a philosopher of aesthetics as well as of language, Sartwell has seen the issues of beauty as being a constant in the search for meaning. His 2014 book How to Escape: Magic, Madness, Beauty and Cynicism, looked at a wide variety of artistic expressions and experiences from an aesthetics perspective. This followed his previous work, 2004's Six Names of Beauty, in which he used different words for beauty in a variety of languages including Greek, Sanskrit, Japanese, and Navajo as a gateway to understanding the cultural diversity and similarities between ideas and manifestations of beauty.

On March 3, 2016, Sartwell was placed on leave from his faculty position at Dickinson College in response to posts on his blog in which he accused other philosophy professors of plagiarism. According to Sartwell, the action is related to a video, embedded in the blog post, of Miranda Lambert singing "Time to Get a Gun." In September 2016, The Dickinsonian reported that Sartwell had returned to his position and would resume teaching in the spring of 2017.

Sartwell currently writes for Splice Today; a 2026 article is about his Jewishness, or lack of it.

== Books ==
- The Art of Living: Aesthetics of the Ordinary in World Spiritual Traditions. Albany: SUNY, 1995.
- Obscenity, Anarchy, Reality. Albany: SUNY, 1996.
- Act Like You Know: African-American Autobiography and White Identity. Chicago, Illinois: University of Chicago Press, 1998.
- End of Story: Toward an Annihilation of Language and History. Albany: SUNY, 2000.
- Extreme Virtue: Leadership and Truth in Five Great American Lives. Albany: SUNY, 2003.
- Six Names of Beauty. New York: Routledge, 2004.
- Exquisite Rebel: The Essays of Voltairine de Cleyre — Anarchist, Feminist, Genius (co-edited with Sharon Presley). Albany: SUNY, 2005.
- Against the State: An Introduction to Anarchist Political Theory. Albany: SUNY, 2008.
- Political Aesthetics. Ithaca: Cornell University Press, 2010.
- Editor, The Practical Anarchist: Writings of Josiah Warren. New York: Fordham University Press, 2011. JSTOR
- How to Escape: Magic, Madness, Beauty, and Cynicism. Albany: SUNY, 2014.
- Entanglements: A System of Philosophy. Albany: SUNY Press, 2017.
- Beauty: A Quick Immersion. New York: Tibidabo Publishing, Inc., 2022.

In addition to his books, Sartwell has published more than 40 articles in academic journals such as the British Journal of Aesthetics, Philosophy Today, and American Philosophical Quarterly.

=== Articles ===
- Sartwell, Crispin (January 29, 2017). "The Wax Presidency Wanes as a Human Comes to the White House". The Wall Street Journal. Archived from the original on April 28, 2021.
- Sartwell, Crispin (February 23, 2021). "Opinion: Humans Are Animals. Let's Get Over It". The New York Times.

== See also ==
- Anarchism in the United States
- American philosophy
- List of American philosophers
