= An American Anarchist: The Life of Voltairine de Cleyre =

Book by Paul Avrich

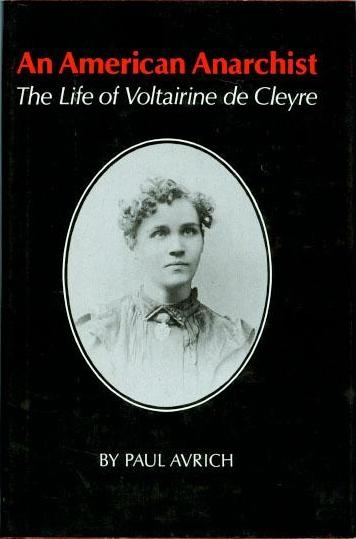
- First edition
- Author: Paul Avrich
- Subject: American biography, anarchism
- Published: 1978 (Princeton University Press)
- Pages: 266
- ISBN: 9780691046570

An American Anarchist: The Life of Voltairine de Cleyre is book written by Paul Avrich. It is a biography of Voltairine de Cleyre.

AK Press republished the title in May 2018.
