= Anarchism and capitalism =

Relationships between the philosophies

The nature of capitalism is criticized by most anarchists, who reject hierarchy and advocate stateless societies based on non-hierarchical voluntary associations. Anarchism is generally defined as the libertarian philosophy which holds the state to be undesirable, unnecessary and harmful as well as opposing authoritarianism, illegitimate authority and hierarchical organization in the conduct of human relations. Capitalism is generally considered by scholars to be an economic system that includes private ownership of the means of production, creation of goods or services for profit or income, the accumulation of capital, competitive markets, and wage labor, which have generally been opposed by most anarchists historically. Since capitalism is variously defined by sources and there is no general consensus among scholars on the definition nor on how the term should be used as a historical category, the designation is applied to a variety of historical cases, varying in time, geography, politics and culture.

== Anarchist criticism of capitalism and economic issues ==
It has been pointed out that historically the anarcho-communist economic theories published by Peter Kropotkin and others have been ignored or intentionally sidelined by historians. Anarchists such as Kropotkin object to the portrayal of economics as a value-free science, arguing in Revolutionary Pamphlets:

[A]ll the so-called laws and theories of political economy are in reality no more than statements of the following nature: "Granting that there are always in a country a considerable number of people who cannot subsist a month, or even a fortnight, without accepting the conditions of work imposed upon them by the State, or offered to them by those whom the State recognizes as owners of land, factories, railways, etc., then the results will be so and so." So far middle-class political economy has been only an enumeration of what happens under the just-mentioned conditions—without distinctly stating the conditions themselves. And then, having described the facts which arise in our society under these conditions, they represent to us these facts as rigid, inevitable economic laws.

Within the realm of anarchist labor issues is the issue of the monetary system. While all anarchists are against the current monetary system, there is disagreement as to whether or not there should be a monetary system. Alexander Berkman was an anarchist against the monetary system. In his book What Is Anarchism?, Berkman argues that in an anarchist society money would become unnecessary. Within anarchy, all occupations are viewed as equally beneficial to society. Since the concept of value is different for everyone and cannot be determined, it is argued that it should not be set and one's contribution to society through their occupation entitled them to be a part of it. Within this system, there is a free distribution of goods without the need for money. Money in its current form is a hierarchical system, the exception being when all people are paid equal salaries. The argument goes further to question the purpose of money if people are paid equally. Those who agree with this would also note that a monetary system would open a vulnerability for some to acquire more of it and create a class system. Some individualist anarchists and mutualists do not oppose the idea of money and see currency as a tangible form of workers receiving the full product of their labor. They support mutual banking (some individualists support no banking at all to keep exchange rates constant) and local currency as opposed to national currency. Others see money as simply an index for exchanging goods and that its existence would not necessarily create a class system.

The anti-capitalist tradition of classical anarchism has remained prominent within post-classical and contemporary currents. Anarchists are committed against coercive authority in all forms, namely "all centralized and hierarchical forms of government (e.g., monarchy, representative democracy, state socialism, etc.), economic class systems (e.g., capitalism, Bolshevism, feudalism, slavery, etc.), autocratic religions (e.g., fundamentalist Islam, Roman Catholicism, etc.), patriarchy, heterosexism, white supremacy, and imperialism". Anarchist schools of thought disagree on the methods by which these forms should be opposed.

=== Equality ===
Collectivist anarchist Mikhail Bakunin famously proclaimed: "We are convinced that freedom without Socialism is privilege and injustice, and that Socialism without freedom is slavery and brutality". With equality meaning equal liberty, Bakunin also argued that "I am truly free only when all human beings, men and women, are equally free. The freedom of other men, far from negating or limiting my freedom, is, on the contrary, its necessary premise and confirmation".

As further confirmation of equality's misunderstanding, anarcho-communist Alexander Berkman similarly argued in The ABC of Anarchism:

"But will not life under Anarchy, in economic and social equality mean general leveling?" you ask. No, my friend, quite the contrary. Because equality does not mean an equal amount but equal opportunity. [...] Do not make the mistake of identifying equality in liberty with the forced equality of the convict camp. True anarchist equality implies freedom, not quantity. It does not mean that every one must eat, drink, or wear the same things, do the same work, or live in the same manner. Far from it: the very reverse, in fact. Individual needs and tastes differ, as appetites differ. It is equal opportunity to satisfy them that constitutes true equality. Far from levelling, such equality opens the door for the greatest possible variety of activity and development. For human character is diverse, and only the repression of this free diversity results in levelling, in uniformity and sameness. Free opportunity and acting out your individuality means development of natural dissimilarities and variations. [...] Life in freedom, in Anarchy, will do more than liberate man merely from his present political and economic bondage. That will be only the first step, the preliminary to a truly human existence.

=== Private property ===
There is some debate about the question of private property and economic organization which is mainly caused by the meaning of private property. Social anarchists claim that the existence of private property (productive property) results in wage slavery while certain anti-capitalist individualist anarchists and mutualists argue for private property (personal property and possessions) and wages owned and controlled directly by workers themselves in the form of worker cooperatives such as labor-owned cooperative firms and associations. For the anarchist and socialist Pierre-Joseph Proudhon, "strong workers' associations would enable the workers to determine jointly by election how the enterprise was to be directed and operated on a day-to-day basis".

=== Wage labor ===
Individualist anarchists such as Benjamin Tucker, who identified his individualist anarchism as anarchistic socialism, are opposed to both capitalism and compulsory communism. Those anarchists support wage labor as long as the employers and employees are paid equally for equal hours worked and neither party has authority over the other. This approach was put into practice in American individualist anarchist colonies such as Utopia, organized by Josiah Warren. By following this principle, no individual profits from the labor of another. Tucker described the wages received in such an employer-employee relationship as the individual laborer's full product. He envisioned that in such a society every worker would be self-employed and own their own private means of production, free to walk away from employment contracts. Tucker called communism "pseudo-anarchism" because it opposes wages and property, fearing that collectivization would subdue individuals to group mentality and rob workers of the full product of their labor.

The Preamble to the Constitution of the anarcho-syndicalist Industrial Workers of the World labor union states unequivocally:

Instead of the conservative motto, "A fair day's wage for a fair day's work," we must inscribe on our banner the revolutionary watchword, "Abolition of the wage system."

== Anarchism and anarcho-capitalism ==
=== Anarcho-capitalism ===
Anarcho-capitalism is a political philosophy that espouses anything voluntary is legitimate, including a voluntary employee/employer hierarchy which anarchists reject. Anarcho-capitalists advocate the elimination of centralised state in favour of self-ownership and individual sovereignty, private property and free markets. Anarcho-capitalism developed from radical American anti-state libertarianism and individualist anarchism, drawing from Austrian School economics and public choice theory. Anarcho-capitalists are distinguished from minarchists, who advocate a small Jeffersonian night-watchman state limited to protecting individuals and their properties from foreign and domestic aggression; and from anarchists, who support personal property and oppose private ownership of the means of production, interest, profit, rent and wage slavery which they view as inherent to capitalism. Anarcho-capitalists hold that in the absence of statute, society tends to contractually self-regulate and civilize through the spontaneous and organic discipline of the free market in what its proponents describe as a voluntary society.

Anarcho-capitalists believe that capitalism is the absence of coercion and therefore fully compatible with the philosophy of anarchism; they claim that an effort to put a stop to what they consider "voluntary hierarchy" is inconsistent with the philosophical tradition of "freedom" present in anarchist thought. Some argue that anarcho-capitalism is a form of individualist anarchism, although this has been contested or rejected, including an individualist–socialist divide. Many others deny that anarcho-capitalism is a form of anarchism at all, or that capitalism is compatible with anarchism, seeing it as a form of New Right libertarianism.

Anarcho-capitalists support wage labor and do not explicitly support workplace democracy and workers' self-management as anarchists do, claiming that wage labor is always voluntary. However, anarchists argue that certain capitalist transactions, including wage labor, are not voluntary and that maintaining the class structure of a capitalist society requires coercion which violates both anarchist principles and anarcho-capitalism's non-aggression principle.

Anarcho-capitalist author and theorist Murray Rothbard, who coined the term itself and developed such philosophy from the 1950s through the 1970s, stated that individualist anarchism is different from capitalism because the individualist anarchists retain the labor theory of value and socialist doctrines. Anarchist commentators do not consider anarcho-capitalism as a legitimate form of anarchism due to perceived coercive characteristics of capitalism. In particular, they argue that certain capitalist transactions are not voluntary and that maintaining the class structure of a capitalist society requires coercion in violation of anarchist principles.

In an anarcho-capitalist society, law enforcement, courts and all other security services would be operated by privately funded competitors selected by consumers rather than centrally through confiscatory taxation. Along with all other goods and services, money would be privately and competitively provided in an open market and personal and economic activities would be regulated by victim-based dispute resolution organizations under tort and contract law, rather than by statute through centrally determined punishment under political monopolies which tend to become corrupt in proportion to their monopolization. Business regulations such as corporate standards, public relations, product labels, rules for consumer protection, ethics and labor relations would be regulated voluntarily via the use of competitive trade associations, professional societies and standards bodies. In theory, this would establish market-recourse for businesses' decisions and allow the market to communicate effectively with businesses by the use of consumer unions instead of centralized regulatory mandates for companies imposed by the state which anarcho-capitalists argue is inefficient due to regulatory capture.

Anarcho-capitalists such as Hans-Hermann Hoppe claim that their philosophy predates the socialist forms of anarchism as according to them various liberal theorists have espoused legal and political philosophies similar to anarcho-capitalism. However, the first person to use the term anarcho-capitalism was Murray Rothbard, who synthesized in the mid-20th century elements from the Austrian School, classical liberalism and 19th-century American individualist anarchists Benjamin Tucker and Lysander Spooner while rejecting their labor theory of value and the norms they derived from it. A Rothbardian anarcho-capitalist society would operate under a mutually agreed-upon libertarian "legal code which would be generally accepted, and which the courts would pledge themselves to follow". This pact would recognize self-ownership, property, contracts and tort law in keeping with the universal non-aggression principle, with anarcho-capitalists arguing that it represents the only pure form of anarchism.

Rothbard argued that the capitalist system is not properly anarcho-capitalist because it so often colludes with the state, writing: "The difference between free-market capitalism and state capitalism is precisely the difference between, on the one hand, peaceful, voluntary exchange, and on the other, violent expropriation. State capitalism inevitably creates all sorts of problems which become insoluble". According to Rothbard, "what Marx and later writers have done is to lump together two extremely different and even contradictory concepts and actions under the same portmanteau term. These two contradictory concepts are what I would call 'free-market capitalism' on the one hand, and 'state capitalism' on the other". However, despite Rothbard's claims, Marxists do make a distinction between free-market capitalism and state capitalism. The term state capitalism was first used by Marxist politician Wilhelm Liebknecht in 1896 and Friedrich Engels, who developed Marxist theory, talked about capitalism with state ownership as a different form of capitalism.

Rothbard maintained that anarcho-capitalism is the only true form of anarchism—the only form of anarchism that could possibly exist in reality as he argues that any other form presupposes an authoritarian enforcement of political ideology such as "redistribution of private property". According to this argument, the free market is simply the natural situation that would result from people being free from authority and entails the establishment of all voluntary associations in society such as cooperatives, non-profit organizations, businesses and so on. Moreover, anarcho-capitalists as well as classical liberal minarchists argue that the application of anarchist ideals as advocated by what they term left-wing anarchists would require an authoritarian body of some sort to impose it. Based on their understanding of anarchism, in order to forcefully prevent people from accumulating capital, which they believe is a goal of those anarchists, there would necessarily be a redistributive organization of some sort which would have the authority to in essence exact a tax and re-allocate the resulting resources to a larger group of people. They conclude that this body would inherently have political power and would be nothing short of a state. The difference between such an arrangement and an anarcho-capitalist system is what anarcho-capitalists see as the voluntary nature of organization within anarcho-capitalism contrasted with a centralized ideology and a paired enforcement mechanism which they believe would be necessary under a "coercively" egalitarian-anarchist system. On the other hand, anarchists argue that a state is required to maintain private property and for capitalism to function.

Rothbard also wrote a piece published posthumously entitled "Are Libertarians 'Anarchists'?" in which he traced the etymological roots of anarchist philosophy, ultimately coming to the conclusion that "we find that all of the current anarchists are irrational collectivists, and therefore at opposite poles from our position. That none of the proclaimed anarchist groups correspond to the libertarian position, that even the best of them have unrealistic and socialistic elements in their doctrines". Furthermore, he wrote: "We must therefore conclude that we are not anarchists, and that those who call us anarchists are not on firm etymological ground, and are being completely unhistorical. On the other hand, it is clear that we are not archists either: we do not believe in establishing a tyrannical central authority that will coerce the noninvasive as well as the invasive. Perhaps, then, we could call ourselves by a new name: nonarchist".

==== Anarchist view ====
Conversely, many anarchists do not believe that anarcho-capitalism can be considered to be a part of the anarchist movement due to the fact that anarchism has historically been an anti-capitalist movement and see anarchism as fundamentally incompatible with capitalism because capitalism produces an economic hierarchy. Throughout its history, anarchism has been defined by its proponents in opposition to capitalism which they believe can be maintained only by state violence. Anarchists follow Pierre-Joseph Proudhon in opposing ownership of workplaces by capitalists and aim to replace wage labor with workers' associations. Anarchists also agree with Peter Kropotkin's comment that "the origin of the anarchist inception of society [lies in] the criticism [...] of the hierarchical organisations and the authoritarian conceptions of society" rather than in simple opposition to the state or government. They argue that the wage system is hierarchical and authoritarian in nature and consequently capitalism cannot be anarchist.

Individualist anarchists, including Tucker and Spooner who Rothbard claimed as anarcho-capitalist influences, considered themselves "fervent anti-capitalists [who see] no contradiction between their individualist stance and their rejection of capitalism". Many defined themselves as socialists. Those early individualist anarchists defined capitalism in various ways, but it was often discussed in terms of usury: "There are three forms of usury, interest on money, rent on land and houses, and profit in exchange. Whoever is in receipt of any of these is a usurer". Excluding these, they tended to support free trade, free competition and varying levels of private property such as mutualism based on occupation and use property norms. It is this distinction which has led to the rift between anarchism and anarcho-capitalism, with the latter supporting the homestead principle. As anarchists consider themselves to be socialists and opposed to capitalism, anarcho-capitalism is seen as not being a form of anarchism.

Anarchist organisations such as the Confederación Nacional del Trabajo (Spain) and the Anarchist Federation (Britain and Ireland) generally take an explicitly anti-capitalist stance. When in the 20th century several economists began to formulate a form of radical American libertarianism known as anarcho-capitalism, this has met resistance from those who hold that capitalism is inherently oppressive or statist and many anarchists and scholars do not consider anarcho-capitalism to properly cohere with the spirit, principles, or history of anarchism. While other anarchists and scholars regard anarchism as referring only to opposition to the non-privatisation of all aspects of the state and do consider anarcho-capitalism to be a form of anarchism,Kevin Carson, Roderick T. Long, Charles W. Johnson, Brad Spangler, Sheldon Richman and Chris Matthew Sciabarra maintain that—because of its heritage, emancipatory goals and potential—radical market anarchism should be seen by its proponents and by others as part of the socialist tradition and that market anarchists can and should call themselves socialists, echoing the language of American individualist anarchists like Benjamin Tucker and Lysander Spooner and British Thomas Hodgskin.

William Gillis has argued that proponents of a genuinely free market, termed freed market to distinguish it from the common left-libertarian conception of a market riddled with capitalist and statist privileges, should explicitly reject capitalism and identify with the global anti-capitalist movement while emphasizing that the abuses the anti-capitalist movement highlights result from state-tolerated violence and state-secured privilege rather than from voluntary cooperation and exchange. Those left-libertarians, also referred to as left-wing market anarchists and market-oriented left-libertarians, distinguish themselves from anarcho-capitalists. Like anarcho-capitalists, proponents of this approach strongly affirm the classical liberal ideas of self-ownership and free markets, but they maintain that taken to their logical conclusions these ideas support anti-capitalist, anti-corporatist, anti-hierarchical and pro-labor positions in economics; anti-imperialism in foreign policy; and thoroughly radical views regarding socio-cultural issues.

Anarcho-capitalists who argue for private property which supports absentee and landlordism ownership rather than occupation and use property norms as well as the principle of homesteading are considered right-libertarians rather than anarchists. This is due to anarchism, including the individualists, viewing any absentee ownership and ownership claims on land and natural resources as immoral and illegitimate, seeing the idea of perpetually binding original appropriation as advocated by some anarcho-capitalists as anathema to schools of anarchism as well as to any moral or economic philosophy that takes equal natural rights to land and the Earth's resources as a premise.

Left-wing market anarchists are closer to mutualism and part of the market anarchist tradition in arguing that a true free-market or laissez-faire system would be best served under socialism rather than capitalism. Chartier has argued that anarcho-capitalists should reject capitalism and call themselves freed-market advocates, writing:

[I]t makes sense for [freed-market advocates] to name what they oppose "capitalism." Doing so calls attention to the freedom movement's radical roots, emphasizes the value of understanding society as an alternative to the state, underscores the fact that proponents of freedom object to non-aggressive as well as aggressive restraints on liberty, ensures that advocates of freedom aren't confused with people who use market rhetoric to prop up an unjust status quo, and expresses solidarity between defenders of freed markets and workers — as well as ordinary people around the world who use "capitalism" as a short-hand label for the world-system that constrains their freedom and stunts their lives.

==== Criticism of anarcho-capitalism ====
Anarchists argue that anarcho-capitalism does not in fact get rid of the state and that it simply privatises it. According to Brian Morris, anarcho-capitalists "simply replaced the state with private security firms, and can hardly be described as anarchists as the term is normally understood". According to anarchist Peter Sabatini, anarcho-capitalism "represents a minority perspective that actually argues for the total elimination of the state", but that anarcho-capitalists' claim as anarchists is "quickly voided" because they "only wants an end to the public state" and allow "countless private states", or that it dissolves into city states as argued by Paul Birch.

Some market abolitionist anarchists argue that while supporters of capitalism and the Austrian School in particular recognize equilibrium prices do not exist, they nonetheless claim that these prices can be used as a rational basis whilst this is not the case, hence markets are not efficient. Anarchists such as Rudolf Rocker argued that a state is required to maintain private property and for capitalism to function. Similarly, Albert Meltzer argued that anarcho-capitalism simply cannot be anarchism because capitalism and the state are inextricably interlinked and because capitalism exhibits domineering hierarchical structures such as that between an employer and an employee.

One major point of contention between anarchism and anarcho-capitalism, causing the latter as not being recognized as part of anarchism, remains that of private property and its meaning. By property, or private property, ever since Proudhon's book What is Property?, published in 1840, anarchists meant possession (what other socialists, including Marxists and communists, distingue as personal property) which he considered as liberty ("Property is liberty") versus productive property (such as land and infrastructure, or what Marxists terms the means of production and the means of labor) which he considered as theft ("Property is theft"), causing him to also say "Property is impossible". However, some individualist anarchists such as Benjamin Tucker started calling possession as property or private property.

While anarcho-capitalists make no distinction between private property and personal property, this is extremely important to anarchists and other socialists because in the capitalist mode of production private and personal property are considered to be exactly equivalent. They make the following distinctions:

- Personal property, or possession, includes items intended for personal use (e.g. one's toothbrush, clothes, homes, vehicles and sometimes money). It must be gained in a socially fair manner and the owner has a distributive right to exclude others.
- Anarchists generally agree that private property is a social relationship between the owner and persons deprived (not a relationship between person and thing), e.g. artifacts, factories, mines, dams, infrastructure, natural vegetation, mountains, deserts and seas. In this context, private property and ownership means ownership of the means of production, not personal possessions.
- To anarchists and other socialists alike, private property is capital or the means of production while personal property is consumer and non-capital goods and services.

Another criticism is that anarcho-capitalism turns justice into a commodity as private defense and court firms would favour those who pay more for their services. Anarchists such as Albert Meltzer argue that since anarcho-capitalism promotes the idea of private armies such as private defense agencies, it actually supports a "limited State". Meltzer contends that it "is only possible to conceive of Anarchism which is free, communistic and offering no economic necessity for repression of countering it". Anarcho-capitalists believe that negative rights should be recognized as legitimate, but positive rights should be rejected. Some critics reject the distinction between positive and negative rights, including Peter Marshall and Noam Chomsky. Marshall argues that the anarcho-capitalist definition of freedom is entirely negative and that it cannot guarantee the positive freedom of individual autonomy and independence. About anarcho-capitalism, Chomsky has written:

Anarcho-capitalism, in my opinion, is a doctrinal system which, if ever implemented, would lead to forms of tyranny and oppression that have few counterparts in human history. There isn't the slightest possibility that its (in my view, horrendous) ideas would be implemented, because they would quickly destroy any society that made this colossal error. The idea of "free contract" between the potentate and his starving subject is a sick joke, perhaps worth some moments in an academic seminar exploring the consequences of (in my view, absurd) ideas, but nowhere else.

Anarchists argue that certain capitalist transactions are not voluntary and that maintaining the class structure of a capitalist society requires coercion which violates both anarchist principles and anarcho-capitalism's non-aggression principle.

Anarchists view any ownership claims on land and natural resources as immoral and illegitimate. While anarchists, including individualist anarchists, market anarchists and mutualists, adamantly oppose absentee ownership, anarcho-capitalists have strong abandonment criteria in which one maintains ownership until one agrees to trade or gift it. Anarchists critics of this view tend to have comparatively weak abandonment criteria as one loses ownership when one stops personally occupying and using it. Furthermore, the idea of perpetually binding original appropriation is considered to be anathema to anarchist schools of thought as well as to any moral or economic philosophy that takes equal natural rights to land and the Earth's resources as a premise.

Anarcho-capitalists believe that inequality is not a major concern so long as everyone has equality of opportunity. Anarcho-capitalist Murray Rothbard argued that "the 'rightist' libertarian is not opposed to inequality". Mises Institute author W. Duncan Reekie argue that because of a person's self-ownership, any freedom given up in a laissez-faire marketplace would be a voluntary contract and that there is nothing authoritarian about capitalist employer–employee relationships in such a condition, writing: "There is nothing authoritarian, dictatorial or exploitative in the relationship. Employees order employers to pay them amounts specified in the hiring contract just as much as employers order employees to abide by the terms of the contract". According to anarchist Peter Sabatini, anarcho-capitalists see "nothing at all wrong with the amassing of wealth, therefore those with more capital will inevitably have greater coercive force at their disposal, just as they do now".

Rothbard defined equality as "A and B are 'equal' if they are identical to each other with respect to a given attribute. [...] There is one and only one way, then, in which any two people can really be 'equal' in the fullest sense: they must be identical in all their attributes". Rothbard argued that "men are not uniform, that the species, mankind, is uniquely characterized by a high degree of variety, diversity, differentiation; in short, inequality". This runs counter the concept of equality amongst anarchists as they argue that freedom without equality simply gives more freedom to those who are supposedly superior and that equality without freedom is a form of oppression.

While anarcho-capitalists such as Murray Rothbard consider themselves part of the individualist anarchist tradition, drawing upon the writings of early American individualist anarchists such as Benjamin Tucker and Lysander Spooner while rejecting their normative claims and other socialist doctrines, Tucker, Spooner and others argued that unequal wealth would not equal an unequal society. Those anarchists believed that equality of condition, equality of access to the means of production and equal opportunity would counteract any potential tyranny in a market society. In following William Godwin, anarchists insist that "inequality corrupts freedom. Their anarchism is directed as much against inequality as against tyranny". It has been argued that while anarcho-capitalists such Rothbard and David D. Friedman have been "sympathetic to Spooner's individualist anarchism", they "fail to notice or conveniently overlook its egalitarian implications". Tucker argued for a society with "the greatest amount of liberty compatible with equality of liberty".

==== Definitional issues ====
Anarchist schools of thought encompass not only a range of individual schools, but also a considerable divergence in the use of some key terms. Some terms such as socialism have been subject to multiple definitions and ideological struggle throughout the period of the development of anarchism. Others such as capitalism are used in divergent and often contradictory ways by different schools within the tradition. In addition, the meanings of terms such as mutualism have changed over time, sometimes without spawning new schools. All of these terminological difficulties contribute to misunderstandings within and about anarchism. A central concern is whether anarchism is defined in opposition to hierarchy, authority and the state, or simply capitalism and the state. Debates over the meaning of anarchism emerge from the fact that it refers to both an abstract philosophical position and to intellectual, political and institutional traditions, all of which have been fraught with conflict. Some minimal, abstract definitions encourage the inclusion of figures, movements and philosophical positions which have historically positioned themselves outside, or even in opposition to, individuals and traditions that have identified themselves as anarchist. While anti-statism is central, there is a lot of talk among scholars and anarchists on the matter and various currents perceive anarchism slightly differently.

While it might be true to say that anarchism is a cluster of political philosophies opposing authority and hierarchical organization (including the state, capitalism, nationalism and all associated institutions) in the conduct of all human relations in favour of a society based on voluntary association, freedom and decentralisation, this definition has its own shortcomings as the definition based on etymology (which is simply a negation of a ruler), or based on anti-statism (anarchism is much more than that) or even the anti-authoritarian (which is an a posteriori concussion). Nonetheless, major elements of the definition of anarchism include the following:

1. The will for a non-coercive society.
2. The rejection of the state apparatus.
3. The belief that human nature allows humans to exist in or progress toward such a non-coercive society.
4. A suggestion on how to act to pursue the ideal of anarchy.

Usages in political circles have varied considerably. In 1888, the individualist anarchist Benjamin Tucker included the full text of a "Socialistic Letter" by Ernest Lesigne in his essay on "State Socialism and Anarchism". According to Lesigne, there are two socialisms: "One is dictatorial, the other libertarian". In 1894, Richard T. Ely noted that anarchism had "already acquired a variety of meanings". In its most general sense, these included the view that society is "a living, growing organism, the laws of which are something different from the laws of individual action". Anti-capitalism is considered a necessary element of anarchism by anarchists. The usage of libertarian is also in dispute. While both anarchists and anarcho-capitalist have used it, libertarian was synonymous with anarchism until the mid-20th century, when anarcho-capitalist theory developed.

Anarcho-capitalists are distinguished from the dominant anarchist tradition by their relation to property and capital. While both anarchism and anarcho-capitalism share general antipathy towards power by government authority, the latter exempts power wielded through free-market capitalism. Anarchists, including egoists such as Max Stirner, have supported the protection of an individual's freedom from powers of both government and private property owners. In contrast, while condemning governmental encroachment on personal liberties, anarcho-capitalists support freedoms based on private property rights. Anarcho-capitalist theorist Murray Rothbard argued that protesters should rent a street for protest from its owners. The abolition of public amenities is a common theme in some anarcho-capitalist writings.

As anarcho-capitalism puts laissez-faire economics before economic equality, it is commonly viewed as incompatible with the anti-capitalist and egalitarian tradition of anarchism. Although anarcho-capitalist theory implies the abolition of the state in favour of a fully laissez-faire economy, it lies outside the tradition of anarchism. While using the language of anarchism, anarcho-capitalism only shares anarchism's antipathy towards the state and not anarchism's antipathy towards hierarchy as theorists expect from anarcho-capitalist economic power relations. It follows a different paradigm from anarchism and has a fundamentally different approach and goals. In spite of the anarcho- in its title, anarcho-capitalism is more closely affiliated with capitalism and right-libertarianism than with anarchism. Some within this laissez-faire tradition reject the designation of anarcho-capitalism, believing that capitalism may either refer to the laissez-faire market they support or the government-regulated system that they oppose.

===== Categorizations =====
Owing to the many anarchist schools of thought, anarchism can be divided into two or more categories, the most used being that of individualist anarchism and social anarchism. Other categorizations may include green anarchism and/or left anarchism and right anarchism. Terms such as anarcho-socialism or socialist anarchism are rejected by most anarchists since they generally consider themselves socialists of the libertarian tradition and are seen as unnecessary and confusing when not used as synonymous with libertarian or stateless socialism and contrasted with authoritarian or state socialism, but they are nevertheless used by anarcho-capitalist theorists and scholars who recognize anarcho-capitalism to differentiate between the two, or what is otherwise referred to as social anarchism.

Anarchist schools of thought such as anarcha-feminism, anarcho-pacifism, anarcho-primitivism, anarcho-transhumanism and green anarchism may have different views of anarchist economics and be part of either individualist anarchism or social anarchism. Since anarchism has been historically identified with the socialist and anti-capitalist movement as well as with socialist economics, the main divide within anarchism is between anti-market anarchists and pro-market anarchists. Anarchists reject both anarcho-capitalism as a form of individualist anarchism and categorizations such as left anarchism and right anarchism (anarcho-capitalism and national-anarchism). Anarchism is usually seen by anarchists and scholars alike as a libertarian socialist and radical left-wing or far-left ideology. According to Peter Marshall, in general "anarchism is closer to socialism than liberalism. [...] Anarchism finds itself largely in the socialist camp, but it also has outriders in liberalism. It cannot be reduced to socialism, and is best seen as a separate and distinctive doctrine". Contra the collectivist or communist wing of social anarchism, seen as representing the more class-struggle oriented and revolutionary socialist-aligned forms of anarchism, individualist anarchism has been described as the anarchist school most influenced by and tied to liberalism (especially classical liberalism) as well as the liberal-socialist or socialist-liberal wing of anarchism and libertarian socialism.

To differentiate it from individualist anarchism, anarchists prefer using social anarchism to characterize certain strides of anarchism from individualist anarchism. The former focuses on the social aspect and is more working class and mass organisational-oriented, supporting decentralised economic planning. The latter focuses on the individual, is more anti-organisational and supports either free-market forms of socialism or other anarchist economics. Nonetheless, anarchists do not seeing the two categories as mutually exclusive or as representing socialist and capitalist views within anarchism. This led to anarchism without adjectives. Mutualism is seen as the middle or third category between social anarchism and individualist anarchism, although it is often considered part of social anarchism and sometimes part of individualist anarchism. Pierre-Joseph Proudhon spoke of social individualism and described the mutualism and the freedom it pursued as the synthesis between communism and property.

While some anarcho-capitalists theorists and scholars divide anarchism into individualist anarchism and social anarchism as representing capitalist and socialist viewpoints, anarchist theorists and scholars reject this. Anarchists do not see this as a struggle between socialism and capitalism, or as social anarchism and individualist anarchism as being mutually exclusive, but rather as complementary. Their differences comes from the means to attain anarchy rather than on their ends. Against some anarcho-capitalist theorists and scholars who see individualist anarchism as pro-capitalist, anarchists reiterate that anarchism is socialist, meaning anti-statist and libertarian socialism. Anarchists such as Luigi Galleani and Errico Malatesta have seen no contradiction between individualist anarchism and social anarchism, with the latter especially seeing the issues not between the two forms of anarchism, but between anarchists and non-anarchists. Anarchists such as Benjamin Tucker argued that it was "not Socialist Anarchism against Individualist Anarchism, but of Communist Socialism against Individualist Socialism". The view of an individualist–socialist divide is contested as individualist anarchism is socialistic.

Several anarcho-communists regard themselves as radical individualists, seeing anarcho-communism as the best social system for the realization of individual freedom. Notwithstanding the name, collectivist anarchism is seen as a blend of individualism and collectivism. Anarchism is considered an anti-authoritarian philosophy that see the individual and the community as complementary rather than mutually exclusive, with anarcho-communism and social anarchism in particular most rejecting the individualist–collectivist dichotomy. In the United States, social anarchism may refer to Murray Bookchin's circle and its omonymous journal.

Despite their differences, anarchist schools of thought are forms of libertarian socialism. Anarchists may see those categorisation in materialist terms. From a materialist perspective, individualist anarchism represents the anarchist form in the pre-capitalist and largely agrarian merchantilist capitalism before the Industrial Revolution, during which individualist anarchism became a form of artisanal and self-employed socialism, especially in the United States. Social anarchism represents the anarchism in an industrial society, being the form of industrial or proletarian socialism, with post-left anarchy and its criticism of industrial technology and anti-workerism arising in a post-industrial society.

Before socialism became associated in the 20th century with Marxist–Leninist states and similar forms of authoritarian and statist socialism, considered by some as state capitalism and administrative command economies rather than planned economies, socialism was a broad concept which was aimed at solving the labor problem through radical changes in the capitalist economy. This caused issues between anarchists and anarcho-capitalists, whose understanding of socialism is that of the 20th century Marxist–Leninist states, with capitalism meaning the free market rather than actually existing capitalism.

===== Left and right anarchism =====
Left anarchism and left-wing anarchism distinguish social anarchism from individualist anarchism. Anarcho-capitalists insist that the real distinction is not social vs individualist but instead social vs capitalist; attempting to include themselves into the anarchist spectrum by placing themselves at dichotomy with social anarchism. Nevertheless, the individualist anarchist tradition is often anti-capitalist

Left anarchism is sometimes used synonymously with libertarian socialism, left-libertarianism, or social anarchism. Anarchists typically discourage the concept of left anarchism on grounds of redundancy and that it lends legitimacy to the notion that anarchism is compatible with capitalism or nationalism.

German author Ulrike Heider categorizes anarchism into left anarchism (anarcho-syndicalism), right anarchism (anarcho-capitalism) and green anarchism.

=== Free-market anarchism ===
Although laissez-faire has been commonly associated with capitalism and anarcho-capitalists advocate such a system, there is a similar left-wing or socialist laissez-faire system called free-market anarchism, also referred to as free-market anti-capitalism and free-market socialism to distinguish it from laissez-faire capitalism. One first example of this is mutualism as developed by Pierre-Joseph Proudhon in the 18th century, from which emerged individualist anarchism. Benjamin Tucker is one eminent American individualist anarchist who adopted a laissez-faire system he termed anarchistic socialism in contraposition to state socialism. This tradition has been recently associated with contemporary scholars such as Kevin Carson, Roderick T. Long, Charles W. Johnson, Brad Spangler, Sheldon Richman, Chris Matthew Sciabarra and Gary Chartier, who are critics of laissez-faire as commonly understood and instead argue that a truly laissez-faire system would be anti-capitalist and socialist.

Murray Rothbard, who coined the term anarcho-capitalism and advocated such philosophy, argued that the robber baron period, hailed by the right and despised by the left as a heyday of laissez-faire, was not characterized by laissez-faire at all, but it was in fact a time of massive state privilege accorded to capital. The doyen of modern American market-oriented libertarianism and an Austrian School economist, Rothbard was initially an enthusiastic partisan of the Old Right, particularly because of its general opposition to war and imperialism. However, Rothbard had long embraced a reading of American history that emphasized the role of elite privilege in shaping legal and political institutions—one that was naturally agreeable to many on the left—and came increasingly in the 1960s to seek alliances on the left and especially with members of the New Left in light of the Vietnam War, the military draft and the emergence of the Black Power movement. Working with other radicals like Ronald Radosh and Karl Hess, Rothbard argued that the consensus view of American economic history, according to which a beneficent government has used its power to counter corporate predation, is fundamentally flawed. Rather, he argued that government intervention in the economy has largely benefited established players at the expense of marginalized groups, to the detriment of both liberty and equality. In tandem with his emphasis on the intimate connection between state and corporate power, he defended the seizure of corporations dependent on state largesse by workers and others. Rothbard ultimately broke with the left, allying himself instead with the burgeoning paleoconservative movement.

This caused a divide between left-Rothbardians and right-Rothbardians, with most right-Rothbardians identifying as anarcho-capitalists, conservatives, paleoconservatives, paleolibertarians, propertarians or right-libertarians whereas left-Rothbardians and some thinkers associated with market-oriented libertarianism, drawing on the work of Rothbard during his alliance with the left and on the thought of Karl Hess, came increasingly to identify with the left on a range of issues, including opposition to war, corporate oligopolies and state-corporate partnerships as well as an affinity for cultural liberalism against Rothbard's later cultural conservatism and right-wing populism. One variety of this kind of libertarianism has been a resurgent mutualism, incorporating modern economic ideas such as marginal utility theory into mutualist theory. Carson's Studies in Mutualist Political Economy helped to stimulate the growth of new-style mutualism, articulating a version of the labor theory of value incorporating ideas drawn from Austrian economics.

Some left-Rothbardians are mutualists whereas other left-Rothbardians and market-oriented left-libertarians have declined to embrace mutualist views of real property while sharing the mutualist opposition to corporate hierarchies and wealth concentration. Those left-libertarians have placed particular emphasis on the articulation and defense of a libertarian theory of class and class conflict, although considerable work in this area has been performed by libertarians of other persuasions. Those left-Rothbardians and libertarians maintain that because of its heritage and its emancipatory goals and potential radical market anarchism should be seen by its proponents and by others as part of the socialist tradition and that market anarchists like anarcho-capitalists can and should call themselves socialists, echoing the language of libertarian socialists like American individualist anarchists Benjamin Tucker and Lysander Spooner and British Thomas Hodgskin. Some of those left-Rothbardians have used Rothbardian arguments such as the homestead principle and a labor theory of property to support anarchist concepts such as workers' self-management.

In response to claims from anarcho-capitalists that he uses the term capitalism incorrectly, Kevin Carson says he is deliberately choosing to resurrect what he claims to be an old definition of the term in order to "make a point". He claims that "the term 'capitalism,' as it was originally used, did not refer to a free market, but to a type of statist class system in which capitalists controlled the state and the state intervened in the market on their behalf". Carson holds that "capitalism, arising as a new class society directly from the old class society of the Middle Ages, was founded on an act of robbery as massive as the earlier feudal conquest of the land. It has been sustained to the present by continual state intervention to protect its system of privilege without which its survival is unimaginable". In addition to individualist anarchist Benjamin Tucker's big four monopolies (land, money, tariffs and patents), Carson argues that the state has also transferred wealth to the wealthy by subsidizing organizational centralization in the form of transportation and communication subsidies, arguing that in a truly laissez-faire system the ability to extract a profit from labor and capital would be negligible. In response to criticism from anarcho-capitalists who reject the labor theory of value in favor of the subjective theory of value and support marginalism, the theoretical sections of Carson's Studies in Mutualist Political Economy are presented as an attempt to integrate marginalist critiques into the labor theory of value.

Gary Chartier offers an understanding of property rights as contingent yet tightly constrained social strategies, reflective of the importance of multiple, overlapping rationales for separate ownership and of natural law principles of practical reasonableness, defending robust yet non-absolute protections for these rights in a manner similar to that employed by David Hume. This account is distinguished from anarcho-capitalists who are propertarian and hold Lockean and neo-Lockean views which deduce property rights from the idea of self-ownership and from consequentialist accounts that might license widespread ad hoc interference with the possessions of groups and individuals. Chartier uses this account to ground a clear statement of the natural law basis for the view that solidaristic wealth redistribution by individual persons is often morally required, but as a response by individuals and grass-roots networks to particular circumstances rather than as a state-driven attempt to achieve a particular distributive pattern. Chartier advances detailed arguments for workplace democracy rooted in such natural law principles as subsidiarity which anarcho-capitalists reject, defending it instead as morally desirable and as a likely outcome of the elimination of injustice rather than as something to be mandated by the state. He also discusses natural law approaches to land reform and to the occupation of factories by workers which anarcho-capitalists may see as infringing on property owners' rights. Against anarcho-capitalists who support intellectual property, Chartier objects on natural law grounds to intellectual property protections, drawing on his theory of property rights more generally and developing a general natural law account of boycotts.

==== Left-wing market anarchism ====
Left-wing market anarchism is a form of individualist anarchism, libertarian socialism and free-market anarchism as distinct from anarcho-capitalism, whose genealogy overlaps to a significant degree with that of Steiner–Vallentyne left-libertarianism as the roots of that tradition are sketched in the book The Origins of Left-Libertarianism. Carson–Long-style left-libertarianism is rooted in 19th-century mutualism and in the work of figures such as American individualist anarchists Benjamin Tucker and Lysander Spooner and Thomas Hodgskin, a British critic of capitalism and defender of free trade and early trade unions. Relationships between such market anarchists and the New Left thrived in the 1960s, laying the groundwork for modern left-wing market anarchism.

Left-wing market anarchism identifies with left-libertarianism whereas anarcho-capitalism is considered a form of right-libertarianism. Unlike anarcho-capitalists, they believe that neither claiming nor mixing one's labor with natural resources is enough to generate full private property rights and those who support private property do so under occupation and use property norms as in mutualism or under the condition that recompense is offered to the local or even global community as advocated by geoists and geolibertarians. Arguing that vast disparities in wealth and social influence result from the use of force and especially state power to steal and engross land and acquire and maintain special privileges, members of this thought typically urge the abolition of the state. They judge that in a stateless society, the kinds of privileges secured by the state will be absent and injustices perpetrated or tolerated by the state can be rectified. According to libertarian scholar Sheldon Richman:

Left-libertarians favor worker solidarity vis-à-vis bosses, support poor people's squatting on government or abandoned property, and prefer that corporate privileges be repealed before the regulatory restrictions on how those privileges may be exercised. They see Walmart as a symbol of corporate favoritism—supported by highway subsidies and eminent domain—view the fictive personhood of the limited-liability corporation with suspicion, and doubt that Third World sweatshops would be the "best alternative" in the absence of government manipulation. Left-libertarians tend to eschew electoral politics, having little confidence in strategies that work through the government. They prefer to develop alternative institutions and methods of working around the state.

Unlike anarcho-captalists, left-wing market anarchism explicitly supports the labor movement and their struggles. Left-wing market anarchist Kevin Carson has praised individualist anarchist Dyer Lum's fusion of individualist economics with radical labor activism as "creative" and described him as "more significant than any in the Boston group". Left-libertarian philosopher Roderick T. Long is an advocate of "build[ing] worker solidarity. On the one hand, this means formal organisation, including unionization – but I'm not talking about the prevailing model of "business unions," [...] but real unions, the old-fashioned kind, committed to the working class and not just union members, and interested in worker autonomy, not government patronage". In particular, Long has described the situation as follows:

[T]he present status of unions as governmentally privileged labor cartels is in large part the result of legislation supported by big business, inasmuch as the corporate elite found unions less threatening as regulated junior partners in the corporate régime, playing on its terms, than as independent actors. After all, the achievements, much heralded by the Left, which unions won in their heyday, such as the weekend and the eight-hour day, were won primarily by market means, often over strong government resistance; likewise, the most notable victories of unions in recent years have been won mainly by unofficial, disapproved unions, without violence of either the governmental or freelance variety, and outside of the traditional labor-law establishment. By contrast, the influence of mainstream unions has been steadily declining ever since they accepted the devil's bargain of "help" from big-daddy government, with all the regulatory strings that go with it. Thus when left-wingers complain that unions are in decline and that workers are disempowered on the job, they're complaining about a situation created and sustained by government — and once again, we should be pointing that out to them.

Contemporary left-wing market anarchists show markedly more sympathy than anarcho-capitalists towards various cultural movements which challenge non-governmental relations of power. Left-wing market anarchists such as Roderick T. Long and Charles W. Johnson have called for a recovery of the 19th-century alliance with radical liberalism and feminism. While adopting similar views, including opposition to drug prohibition, gun control, civil liberties violations and war, left-wing market anarchists are more likely than most self-identified anarcho-capitalists to take more distinctively leftist stances on issues as diverse as feminism, gender and sexuality, class, immigration and environmentalism. Especially influential regarding these topics have been scholars including Long, Johnson, Chris Matthew Sciabarra and Arthur Silber. Unlike anarcho-capitalism, left-wing market anarchism also does not have any strict agreement what constitutes legitimate property titles. Arguments have been made for Rothbardian, Georgist, mutualist and utilitarian approaches to determining legitimate property claims. Those discrepancies are resolved through deliberation mechanisms like the polycentric law. Unlike anarcho-capitalists, left-wing market anarchists recognize the importance of property held and managed in common as a way of maintaining common goods.

Market anarchists recognize that anarchism has been historically identified with the socialist and anti-capitalist movement, arguing that anarcho-capitalists should explicitly reject capitalism and identify with the global anti-capitalist movement since by capitalism they mean the free market rather than actually existing capitalism, of which they are critics rather than capitalism itself, arguing that the problem rests on cronyism and state capitalism. The latter is used by anarchists to criticize state socialism as nothing more than state capitalism. Much like socialism has been conflated with state socialism in the 20th century due to Marxist–Leninist states, capitalism has been similarly conflated with the free market when capitalism was coined in the 18th century to mean a construed political system built on privileges for the owners of capital.

Left-wing market anarchists argue that capitalism necessarily rest on the state to survive and that it was always seen as what would be later termed state capitalism. Those anarchists make the point that free market for classical economists such as Adam Smith did not mean a market free from government or social interference as it is now commonly assumed or as anarcho-capitalists argue, but rather free from all forms of economic privilege, monopolies and artificial scarcities, implying that economic rents, i.e. profits generated from a lack of perfect competition, must be reduced or eliminated as much as possible through free competition. Those anarchists argue that a true free-market or laissez-faire system would be better served under socialism rather than capitalism. Anarcho-socialism or socialist anarchism are rejected by anarchists since they consider themselves socialists of the libertarian tradition and are used by anarcho-capitalist theorists and scholars who recognize anarcho-capitalism to differentiate between the two.

=== Globalization ===
Anarchists are actively involved in the anti-globalization movement, seeing corporate globalization as a neocolonialist attempt to use economic coercion on a global scale, carried out through state institutions such as the Group of Eight, the World Bank, the World Economic Forum and the World Trade Organization. Globalization is an ambiguous term that has different meanings to different anarchist factions. Many anarchists use the term to mean cultural imperialism and neocolonialism which they see as related. Groups such as Reclaim the Streets were among the instigators of the so-called anti-globalization movement.

The Carnival Against Capitalism on 18 June 1999 is generally regarded as the first of the major anti-globalization protests. Anarchists such as the WOMBLES have on occasion played a significant role in planning, organising and participating in subsequent protests. The protests tended to be organised on anarchist direct action principles with a general tolerance for a range of different activities ranging from those who engage in tactical frivolity to the black blocs.

== See also ==
- Anarcho-capitalism
- Anarchism and anarcho-capitalism
- Fair trade
- Free trade
- Issues in anarchism
- Labor theory of value
- Marginalism
- Renting
- Usury
- Wage slavery
