= Libertarianism in the United States =

The historical Gadsden flag is frequently used to represent libertarianism in the U.S.

In the United States, libertarianism is a political philosophy promoting individual liberty. Libertarianism has been described as laissez-faire on economic issues while supporting civil liberties and personal freedom. The movement is often associated with a foreign policy of non-interventionism. Broadly, there are four principal traditions within libertarianism, namely the libertarianism that developed in the mid-20th century out of the revival tradition of classical liberalism in the United States after "liberalism" associated with the New Deal; the libertarianism developed in the 1950s by anarcho-capitalist author Murray Rothbard, who based it on the anti-New Deal Old Right and 19th-century libertarianism and American individualist anarchists such as Benjamin Tucker and Lysander Spooner while rejecting the labor theory of value in favor of Austrian School economics and the subjective theory of value; the libertarianism developed in the 1970s by Robert Nozick and founded in American and European classical liberal traditions; and the libertarianism associated with the Libertarian Party, which was founded in 1971, including politicians such as David Nolan and Ron Paul.

The right-libertarianism associated with people such as Murray Rothbard and Robert Nozick, whose book Anarchy, State, and Utopia received significant attention in academia according to David Lewis Schaefer. Right-libertarianism is the dominant form of libertarianism in the United States, compared to that of left-libertarianism. The latter is associated with the left wing of the modern libertarian movement and more recently to the political positions associated with academic philosophers Hillel Steiner, Philippe Van Parijs and Peter Vallentyne that combine self-ownership with an egalitarian approach to natural resources; it is also related to anti-capitalist, free-market anarchist strands such as left-wing market anarchism, referred to as market-oriented left-libertarianism to distinguish itself from other forms of libertarianism.

Libertarianism includes some anarchist tendencies, although they are not as widespread as in other countries. Although all libertarians oppose government intervention, there is a division between those anarchist or socialist libertarians as well as anarcho-capitalists such as Rothbard and David D. Friedman who adhere to the anti-state position, viewing the state as an unnecessary evil; minarchists such as Nozick who advocate a minimal state, often referred to as a night-watchman state; and classical liberals who support a minimized small government and a major reversal of the welfare state.

The major libertarian party in the United States is the Libertarian Party. However, libertarians are also represented within the Democratic and Republican parties, while others are independent. Gallup found that voters who identify as libertarians ranged from 17 to 23% of the American electorate. Yellow, a political color associated with liberalism worldwide, has also been used as a political color for modern libertarianism in the United States. The Gadsden flag and Pine Tree flag, symbols first used by American revolutionaries, are frequently used by libertarians and the libertarian-leaning Tea Party movement.

Although libertarian continues to be widely used to refer to anti-state socialists internationally, its meaning in the United States has deviated from its political origins to the extent that the common meaning of libertarian in the United States is different from elsewhere. In the United States, right-libertarianism has become the most common referent of libertarianism since the late 20th century. Libertarians have worked to implement their ideas through the Libertarian Party, the Free State Project, agorism, and other forms of activism.

== Definition ==
Since the 19th century, the term libertarian has referred to advocates for freedom of the will, or anyone who generally advocated for liberty, but its long association with anarchism extends at least as far back as 1858, when it was used for the title of New York anarchist journal Le Libertaire. In the late 19th century (around the 1880s and 1890s), Anarchist Sébastien Faure used the term libertarian to differentiate between anarchists and authoritarian socialists. While the term libertarian has been largely synonymous with anarchism, its meaning has more recently diluted with wider adoption from ideologically disparate groups. As a term, libertarian can include both the New Left and libertarian Marxists (who do not associate with a vanguard party) as well as extreme liberals (primarily concerned with civil liberties). Additionally, some anarchists use the term libertarian socialist to avoid anarchism's negative connotations and emphasize its connections with socialism.

The revival of free-market ideologies during the mid-to-late 20th century came with disagreement over what to call the movement. While many of its adherents prefer the term libertarian, many conservative libertarians reject the term's association with the 1960s New Left and its connotations of libertine hedonism. The movement is divided over the use of conservatism as an alternative. Those who seek both economic and social liberty within a capitalist order would be known as liberals, but that term developed associations opposite of the limited government, low-taxation, minimal state advocated by the movement. Name variants of the free-market revival movement include classical liberalism, economic liberalism, free-market liberalism and neoliberalism. As a term, libertarian or economic libertarian has the most colloquial acceptance to describe a member of the movement, with the latter term being based on both the ideology's primacy of economics and its distinction from libertarians of the New Left.

According to Ian Adams: "Ideologically, all US parties are liberal and always have been. Essentially they espouse classical liberalism, that is a form of democratised Whig constitutionalism plus the free market. The point of difference comes with the influence of social liberalism" and the proper role of government. Some modern American libertarians are distinguished from the dominant libertarian tradition by their relation to property and capital. While both historical libertarianism and contemporary economic libertarianism share general antipathy towards power by government authority, the latter exempts power wielded through free-market capitalism. Historically, libertarians including Herbert Spencer and Max Stirner have to some degree supported the protection of an individual's freedom from powers of both government and private property owners. In contrast, while condemning governmental encroachment on personal liberties, some modern American libertarians support freedoms based on private property rights. Anarcho-capitalist theorist Murray Rothbard argued that protesters should rent a street for protest from its owners. The abolition of public amenities is a common theme in some modern American libertarian writings.

== History ==
=== 18th century ===
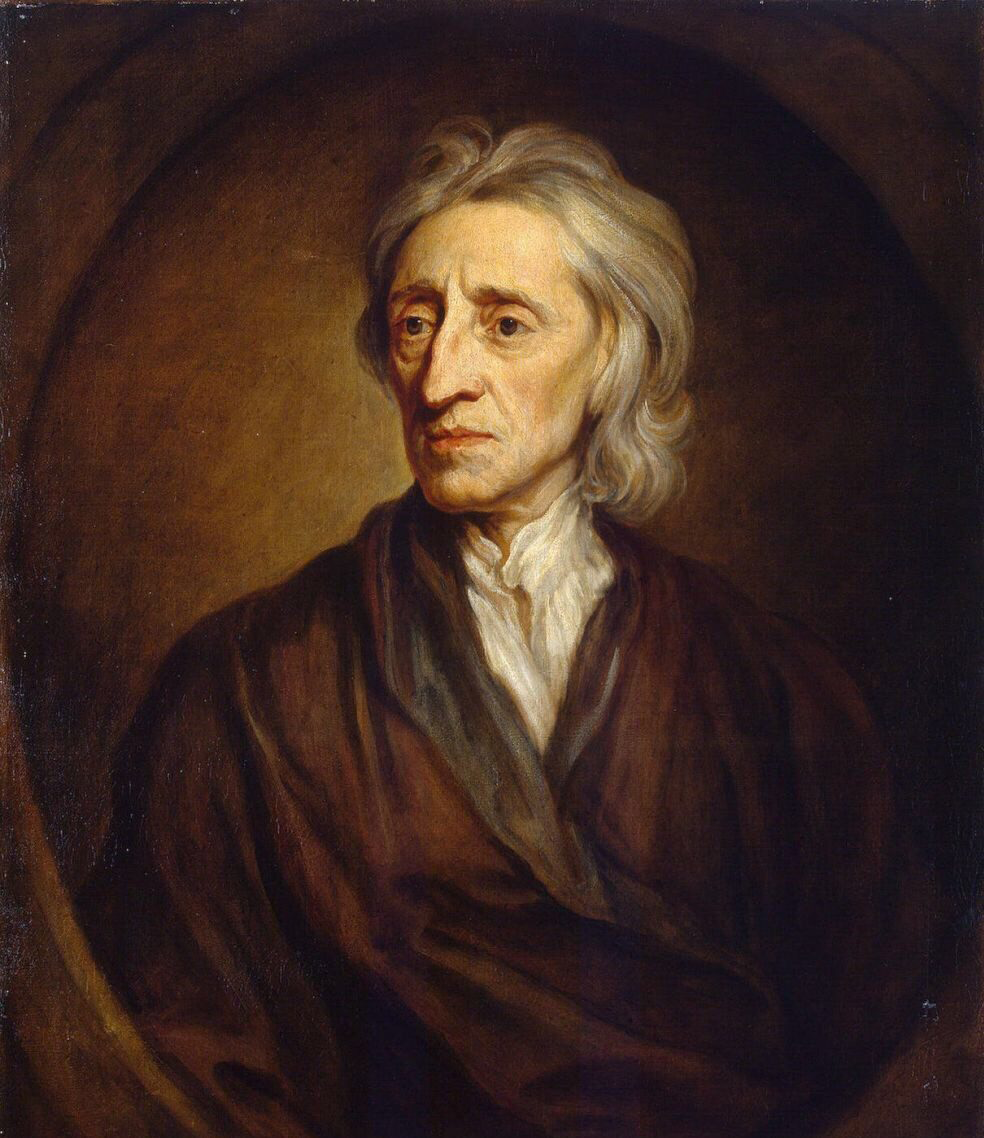
John Locke, regarded as the father of classical liberalism

During the 18th century and Age of Enlightenment, classical liberal ideas flourished in Europe and North America. For philosopher Roderick T. Long, libertarians "share a common – or at least an overlapping—intellectual ancestry. [Libertarians] [...] claim the seventeenth century English Levellers and the eighteenth century French Encyclopedists among their ideological forebears; and [...] usually share an admiration for Thomas Jefferson and Thomas Paine".

The United States Declaration of Independence was inspired by Locke in its statement: "[T]o secure these rights, Governments are instituted among Men, deriving their just powers from the consent of the governed. That whenever any Form of Government becomes destructive of these ends, it is the Right of the People to alter or to abolish it". According to American historian Bernard Bailyn, during and after the American Revolution, "the major themes of eighteenth-century libertarianism were brought to realization" in constitutions, bills of rights, and limits on legislative and executive powers, including limits on starting wars.

Forrest McDonald echoed Rothbard's contentions, arguing that, "without exception, the major British political writers who carried the English libertarian tradition through the eighteenth century were gentrymen who were writing in fierce opposition to the new financial order." This new order had been created by mercantile bankers invested in monetary policy over broader fiscal concerns that included real estate, mostly under the Walpole ministry. In emphasizing the fiscal dimensions of real estate, McDonald averred, "Americans had evolved a set of advanced ideas and institutions regarding the rights of individuals to hold unfettered title to real property; indeed, they had developed the quite radical practice of treating land as an actual commodity, to be bought and sold at will...Thus the Americans absorbed the poison of antifinance capitalism with their mother's milk of liberty." McDonald pointed out, however, that "the Americans" periodically failed to collapse or conflate dual branches of a given dichotomy. For example, "the British writers and their American readers distinguished between liberty and licentiousness, the one resting upon virtue [in government], and the other upon depravity. But the distinction was scarcely one to satisfy any true libertarian."

In January 1776, only two years after coming to America from England, Thomas Paine published his pamphlet Common Sense calling for independence for the colonies. Paine promoted classical liberal ideas in clear and concise language that allowed the general public to understand the debates among the political elites. Common Sense was immensely popular in disseminating these ideas, selling hundreds of thousands of copies. Paine would later write the Rights of Man and The Age of Reason and participate in the French Revolution. Paine's theory of property showed a "libertarian concern" with the redistribution of resources.

=== 19th and 20th century ===
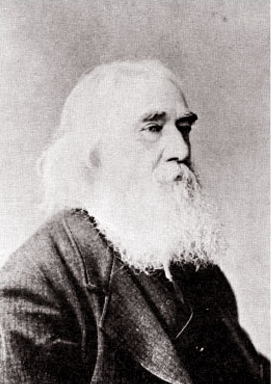
Individualist anarchist Lysander Spooner, whose No Treason: The Constitution of No Authority greatly influenced libertarianism in the United States

In the 19th century, libertarian philosophies included libertarian socialism and anarchist schools of thought such as individualist and social anarchism. Key libertarian thinkers included Benjamin Tucker, Lysander Spooner, Stephen Pearl Andrews and William Batchelder Greene, among others. While most of these anarchist thinkers advocated for the abolition of the state, other key libertarian thinkers and writers such as Henry David Thoreau, Ralph Waldo Emerson and Spooner in No Treason: The Constitution of No Authority argued that government should be kept to a minimum and that it is only legitimate to the extent that people voluntarily support, leaving a significant imprint on libertarianism in the United States. The use of the term libertarianism to describe a left-wing position has been traced to the French cognate libertaire, a word coined in a letter French libertarian communist Joseph Déjacque wrote to anarchist Pierre-Joseph Proudhon in 1857. While in New York City, Déjacque was able to serialize his book L'Humanisphère, Utopie anarchique (The Humanisphere: Anarchic Utopia) in his periodical Le Libertaire, Journal du Mouvement Social (Libertarian: Journal of Social Movement), published in 27 issues from June 9, 1858, to February 4, 1861. Le Libertaire was the first libertarian communist journal published in the United States as well as the first anarchist journal to use libertarian. Tucker was the first American born to use libertarian. By around the start of the 20th century, the heyday of individualist anarchism had passed.

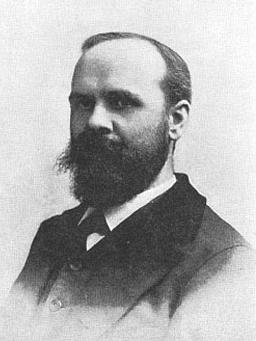
Benjamin Tucker, an individualist anarchist who contrapposed his anarchist socialism to state socialism

Moving into the 20th century, the Libertarian League was an anarchist and libertarian socialist organization. The first Libertarian League was founded in Los Angeles between the two World Wars. It was established mainly by Cassius V. Cook, Charles T. Sprading, Clarence Lee Swartz, Henry Cohen, Hans F. Rossner and Thomas Bell. In 1954, a second Libertarian League was founded in New York City as a political organization building on the Libertarian Book Club. Members included Sam Dolgoff, Russell Blackwell, Dave Van Ronk, Enrico Arrigoni and Murray Bookchin. This Libertarian League had a narrower political focus than the first, promoting anarchism and syndicalism. Its central principle, stated in its journal Views and Comments, was "equal freedom for all in a free socialist society". Branches of the Libertarian League opened in a number of other American cities, including Detroit and San Francisco. It was dissolved at the end of the 1960s.

The 1960s also saw an alliance between the nascent New Left and other radical libertarians who came from the Old Right tradition like Murray Rothbard, Ronald Radosh and Karl Hess in opposition to imperialism and war, especially in relation to the Vietnam War and its opposition. These radicals had long embraced a reading of American history that emphasized the role of elite privilege in shaping legal and political institutions, one that was naturally agreeable to many on the left, increasingly seeking alliances with the left, especially with members of the New Left, in light of the Vietnam War, the military draft and the emergence of the Black Power movement. Rothbard argued that the consensus view of American economic history, according to which a beneficent government has used its power to counter corporate predation, is fundamentally flawed. Rather, he argued that government intervention in the economy has largely benefited established players at the expense of marginalized groups, to the detriment of both liberty and equality. Moreover, the robber baron period, hailed by the right and despised by the left as a heyday of laissez-faire, was not characterized by laissez-faire at all, but it was in fact a time of massive state privilege accorded to capital. In tandem with his emphasis on the intimate connection between state and corporate power, he defended the seizure of corporations dependent on state largesse by workers and others. This tradition would continue through the 20th and 21st centuries, being taken up by the left-libertarian, free-market anti-capitalism of both Samuel Edward Konkin III's agorism and left-wing market anarchism.

=== Mid-20th century ===
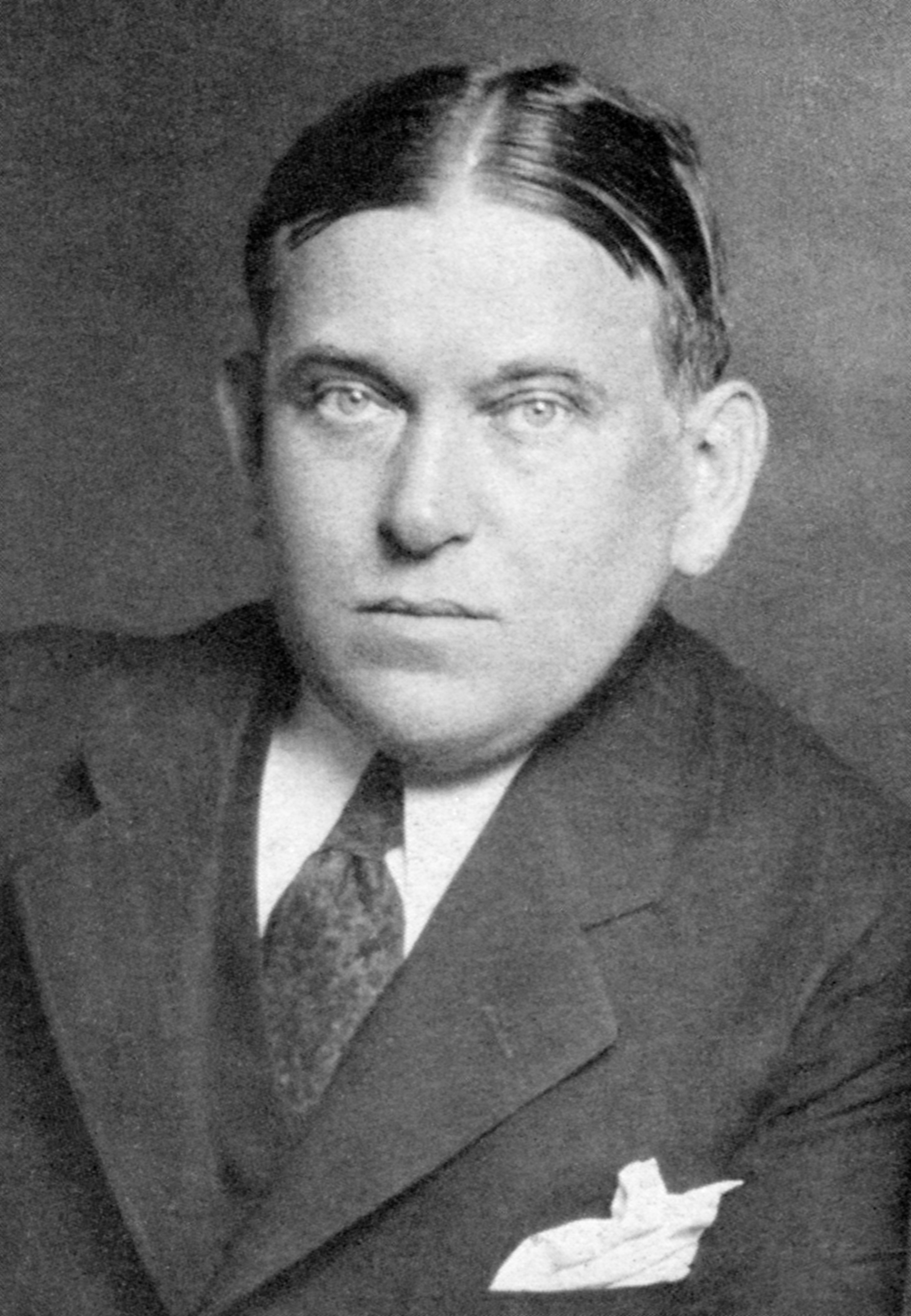
H. L. Mencken, one of the first people to privately call himself libertarian

During the mid-20th century, many with Old Right or classical liberal beliefs began to describe themselves as libertarians. Important American writers such as Rose Wilder Lane, H. L. Mencken, Albert Jay Nock, Isabel Paterson, Leonard Read (the founder of the Foundation for Economic Education) and the European immigrants Ludwig von Mises and Ayn Rand carried on the intellectual libertarian tradition. In fiction, one can cite the work of the science fiction author Robert A. Heinlein, whose writing carried libertarian underpinnings. Mencken and Nock were the first prominent figures in the United States to privately call themselves libertarians. They believed Franklin D. Roosevelt had co-opted the word liberal for his New Deal policies which they opposed and used libertarian to signify their allegiance to individualism. In 1923, Mencken wrote: "My literary theory, like my politics, is based chiefly upon one idea, to wit, the idea of freedom. I am, in belief, a libertarian of the most extreme variety".

As of the mid-20th century, no word was used to describe the ideological outlook of this group of thinkers. Most of them would have described themselves as liberals before the New Deal, but by the mid-1930s the word liberalism had been widely used to mean social liberalism with the New Deal realignment of American politics. The word liberal had ceased to refer to the support of individual rights and limited government and instead came to denote left-leaning ideas that would be seen elsewhere as social-democratic. American advocates of classical liberalism bemoaned the loss of the word liberal and cast about for others to replace it.

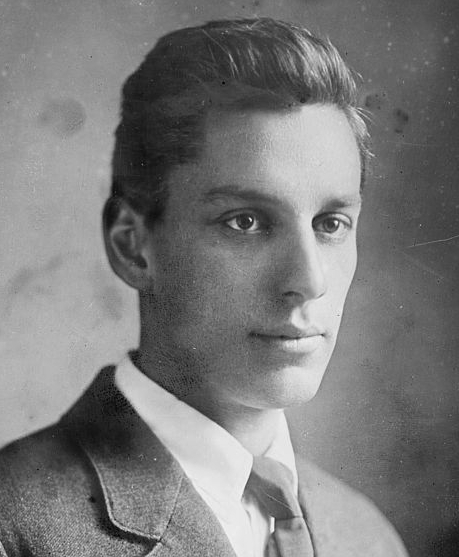
Max Eastman, a former socialist who proposed the terms New Liberalism and liberal conservative

In August 1953, Max Eastman proposed the terms New Liberalism and liberal conservative which were not eventually accepted. In May 1955, the term libertarian was first publicly used in the United States as a synonym for classical liberal when writer Dean Russell (1915–1998), a colleague of Leonard Read and a classical liberal himself, proposed the libertarian solution and justified the choice of the word as follows:

Many of us call ourselves "liberals." And it is true that the word "liberal" once described persons who respected the individual and feared the use of mass compulsions. But the leftists have now corrupted that once-proud term to identify themselves and their program of more government ownership of property and more controls over persons. As a result, those of us who believe in freedom must explain that when we call ourselves liberals, we mean liberals in the uncorrupted classical sense. At best, this is awkward and subject to misunderstanding. Here is a suggestion: Let those of us who love liberty trade-mark and reserve for our own use the good and honorable word "libertarian".

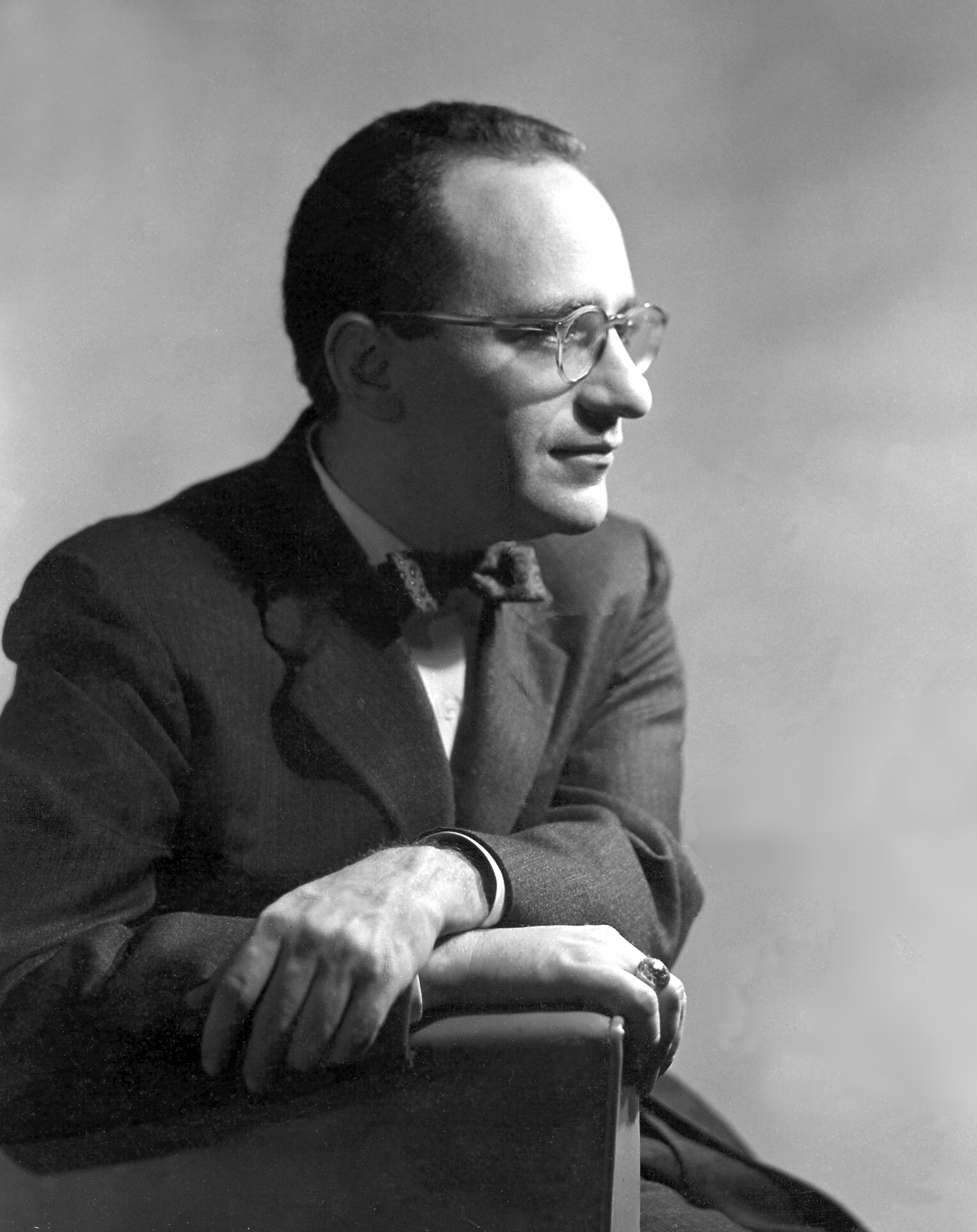
Murray Rothbard, who popularized the term libertarian in the 1960s

Subsequently, a growing number of Americans with classical liberal beliefs in the United States began to describe themselves as libertarian. The person most responsible for popularizing the term libertarian was Murray Rothbard, who started publishing libertarian works in the 1960s. Before the 1950s, H.L. Mencken and Albert Jay Nock had been the first prominent figures in the United States to privately call themselves libertarians. In the 1950s, Russian-American novelist Ayn Rand developed a philosophical system called Objectivism, expressed in her novels The Fountainhead and Atlas Shrugged as well as other works which influenced many libertarians. However, she rejected the label libertarian and harshly denounced the libertarian movement as the "hippies of the right". Nonetheless, philosopher John Hospers, a one-time member of Rand's inner circle, proposed a non-initiation of force principle to unite both groups—this statement later became a required pledge for candidates of the Libertarian Party and Hospers himself became its first presidential candidate in 1972. Along with Isabel Paterson and Rose Wilder Lane, Rand is described as one of the three female founding figures of the modern libertarian movement in the United States.

Although influenced by the work of the 19th-century American individualist anarchists, themselves influenced by classical liberalism. Rothbard thought they had a faulty understanding of economics because they accepted the labor theory of value as influenced by the classical economists while he was a student of neoclassical economics and supported the subjective theory of value. Rothbard sought to meld 19th-century American individualists' advocacy of free markets and private defense with the principles of Austrian economics, arguing that there is a "scientific explanation of the workings of the free market (and of the consequences of government intervention in that market) which individualist anarchists could easily incorporate into their political and social Weltanschauung".

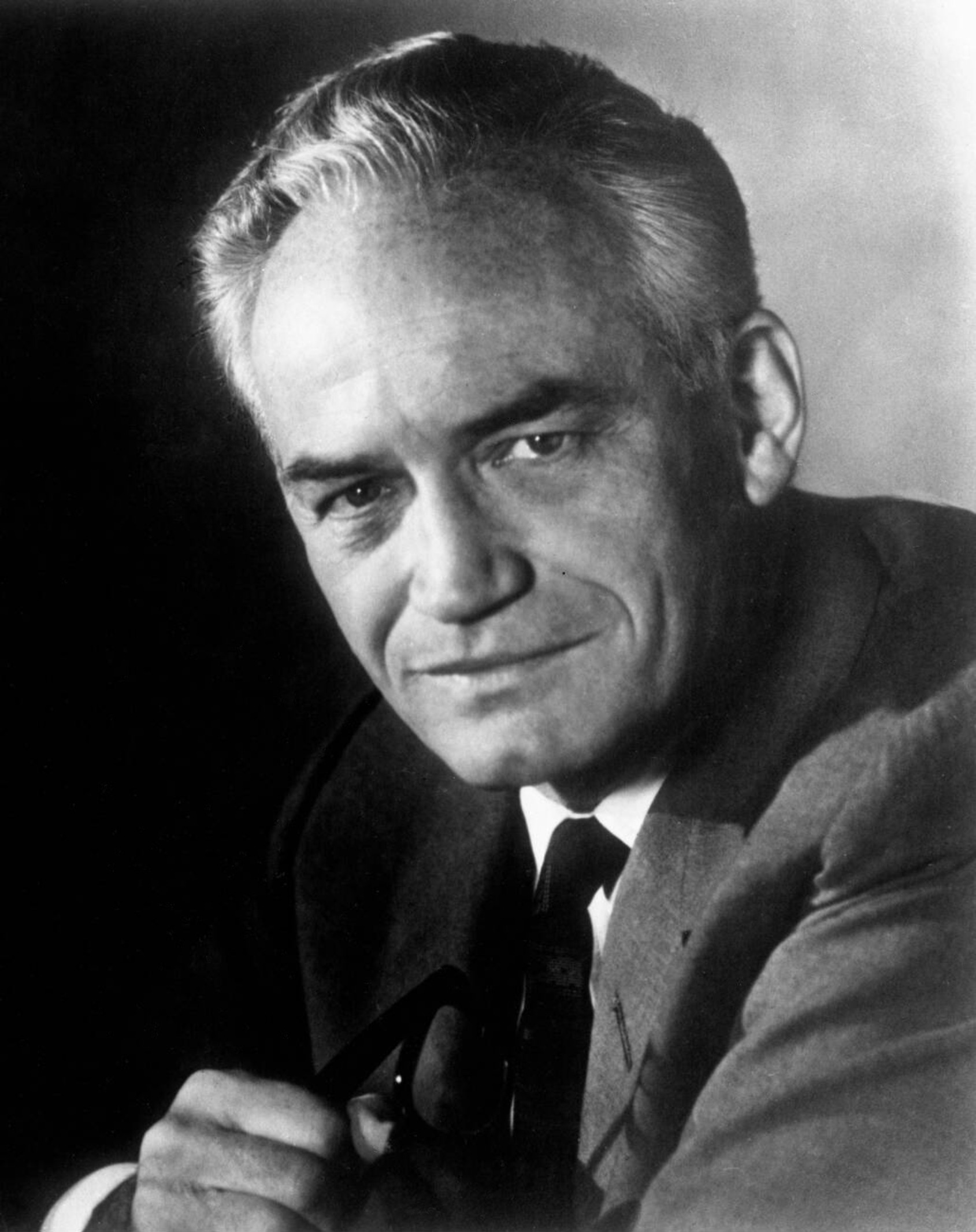
Barry Goldwater, whose libertarian-oriented challenge to authority had a major impact on the libertarian movement

Arizona Senator Barry Goldwater's libertarian-oriented challenge to authority had a major impact on the libertarian movement through his book The Conscience of a Conservative and his 1964 presidential campaign. Goldwater's speech writer Karl Hess became a leading libertarian writer and activist. The Vietnam War split the uneasy alliance between growing numbers of self-identified libertarians and traditionalist conservatives who believed in limiting liberty to uphold moral virtues. Libertarians opposed to the war joined the draft resistance and peace movements and organizations such as Students for a Democratic Society. They began founding their own publications like Rothbard's The Libertarian Forum and organizations like the Radical Libertarian Alliance. The split was aggravated at the 1969 Young Americans for Freedom convention when more than 300 libertarians coordinated to take control of the organization from conservatives. The burning of a draft card in protest to a conservative proposal against draft resistance sparked physical confrontations among convention attendees, a walkout by a large number of libertarians, the creation of libertarian organizations like the Society for Individual Liberty and efforts to recruit potential libertarians from conservative organizations. The split was finalized in 1971 when conservative leader William F. Buckley Jr. attempted to divorce libertarianism from the movement, writing in a New York Times article as follows: "The ideological licentiousness that rages through America today makes anarchy attractive to the simple-minded. Even to the ingeniously simple-minded".

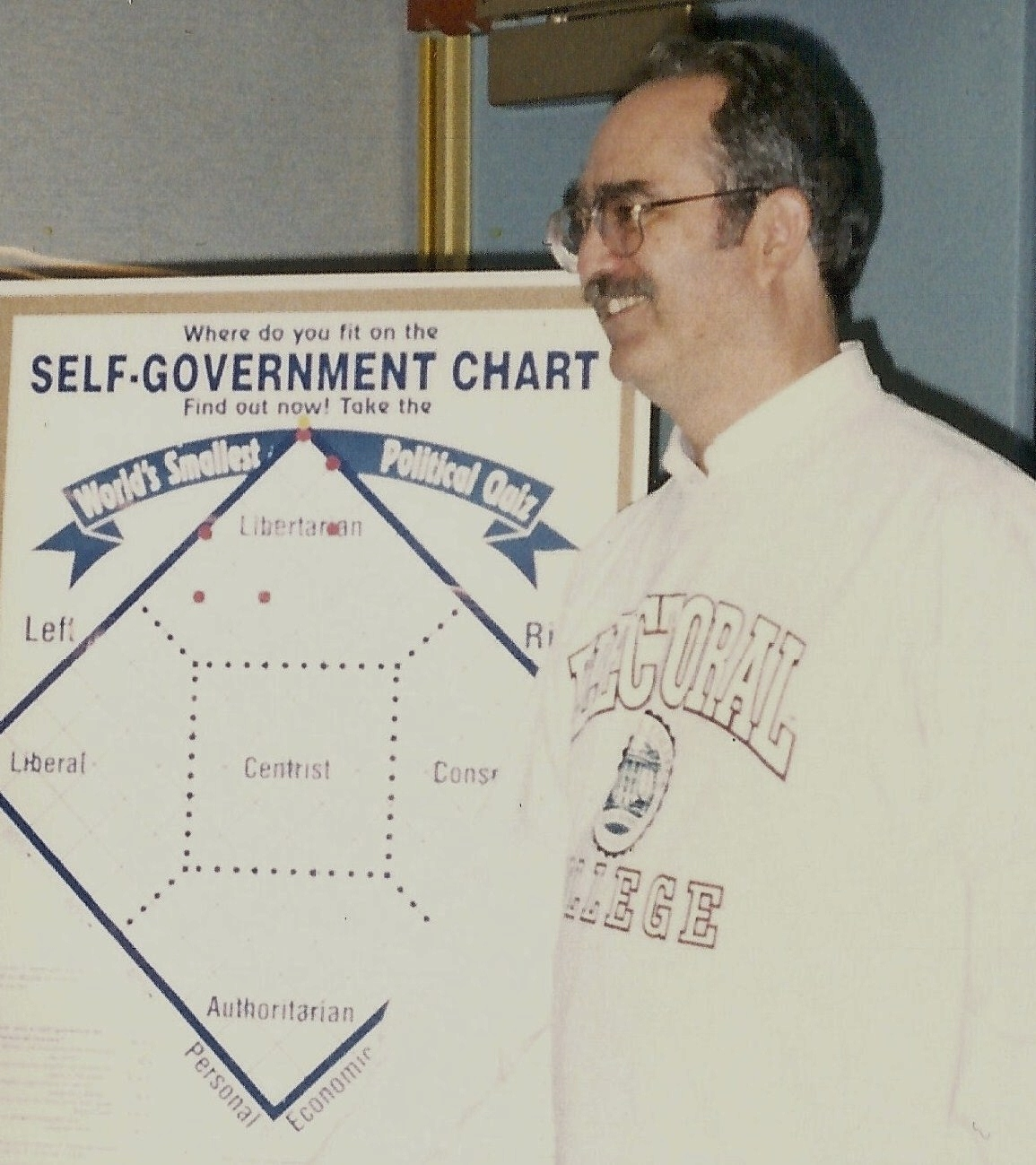
David Nolan, founder of the Libertarian Party

As a result of the split, a small group of Americans led by David Nolan and a few friends formed the Libertarian Party in 1971. Attracting former Democrats, Republicans and independents, it has run a presidential candidate every election year since 1972. Over the years, dozens of libertarian political parties have been formed worldwide. Educational organizations like the Center for Libertarian Studies and the Cato Institute were formed in the 1970s and others have been created since then. Philosophical libertarianism gained a significant measure of recognition in academia with the publication in 1974 of Harvard University professor Robert Nozick's Anarchy, State, and Utopia, a response to John Rawls's A Theory of Justice (1971). The book proposed a minimal state on the grounds that it was an inevitable phenomenon that could arise without violating individual rights. The book won a National Book Award in 1975. According to libertarian essayist Roy Childs, "Nozick's Anarchy, State, and Utopia single-handedly established the legitimacy of libertarianism as a political theory in the world of academia".

British historians Emily Robinson, Camilla Schofield, Florence Sutcliffe-Braithwaite and Natalie Thomlinson have argued that by the 1970s Britons were keen about defining and claiming their individual rights, identities and perspectives. They demanded greater personal autonomy and self-determination and less outside control. They angrily complained that the establishment was withholding it. They argue this shift in concerns helped cause Thatcherism and was incorporated into Thatcherism's appeal. Since the resurgence of neoliberalism in the 1970s, this form of libertarianism has spread beyond North America and Europe, having been more successful at spreading worldwide than other conservative ideas. It has been noted that "[m]ost parties of the Right [today] are run by economically liberal conservatives who, in varying degrees, have marginalized social, cultural, and national conservatives".

=== Late 20th century ===
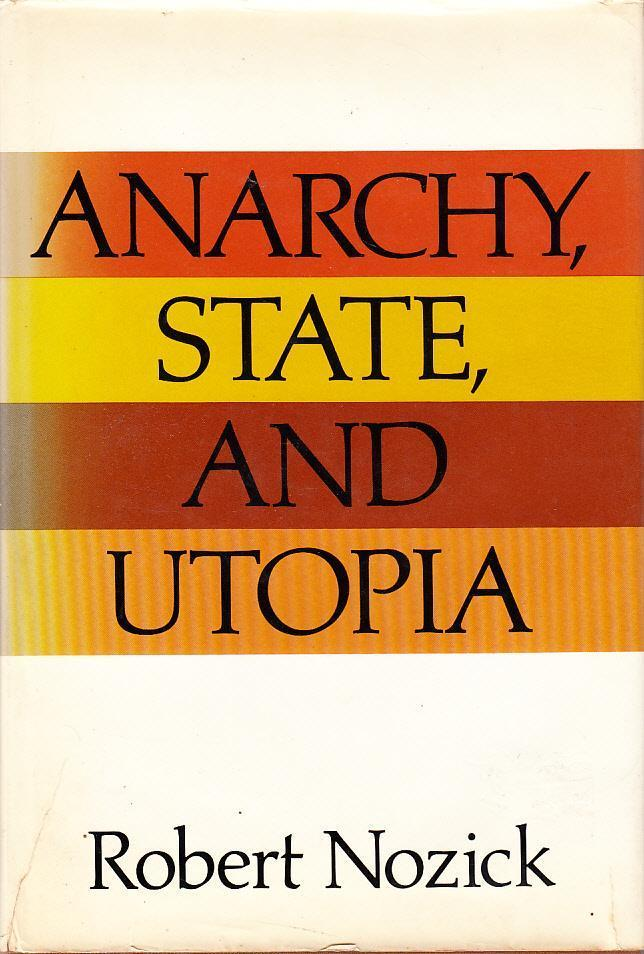
Robert Nozick's Anarchy, State, and Utopia helped spread libertarian ideas worldwide in the 1970s.

Academics as well as proponents of the capitalist free-market perspectives note that libertarianism has spread beyond the United States since the 1970s via think tanks and political parties and that libertarianism is increasingly viewed as a capitalist free-market position. However, libertarian intellectuals Noam Chomsky, Colin Ward and others argue that the term libertarianism is considered a synonym for anarchism and libertarian socialism by the international community and that the United States is unique in widely associating it with the capitalist free-market ideology. Modern libertarianism in the United States mainly refers to classical and economic liberalism. It supports capitalist free-market approaches as well as neoliberal policies and economic liberalization reforms such as austerity, deregulation, free trade, privatization and reductions in government spending in order to increase the role of the private sector in the economy and society. This is unlike the common meaning of libertarianism elsewhere, with libertarianism being used to refer to the largely overlapping right-libertarianism, the most popular conception of libertarianism in the United States, where the term itself was first coined and used by Joseph Déjacque to refer to a new political philosophy rejecting all authority and hierarchies, including the market and property.

In a 1975 interview with Reason, California Governor Ronald Reagan appealed to libertarians when he stated to "believe the very heart and soul of conservatism is libertarianism". Ron Paul was one of the first elected officials in the nation to support Reagan's presidential campaign and actively campaigned for Reagan in 1976 and 1980. However, Paul quickly became disillusioned with the Reagan administration's policies after Reagan's election in 1980 and later recalled being the only Republican to vote against Reagan budget proposals in 1981, noting that "in 1977, Jimmy Carter proposed a budget with a $38 billion deficit, and every Republican in the House voted against it. In 1981, Reagan proposed a budget with a $45 billion deficit – which turned out to be $113 billion – and Republicans were cheering his great victory. They were living in a storybook land". Paul expressed his disgust with the political culture of both major parties in a speech delivered in 1984 upon resigning from the House of Representatives to prepare for a failed run for the Senate and eventually apologized to his libertarian friends for having supported Reagan. By 1987, Paul was ready to sever all ties to the Republican Party as explained in a resignation letter. While affiliated with both Libertarian and Republican parties at different times, Paul said he had always been a libertarian at heart. Paul was the Libertarian Party candidate for president in 1988.

In the 1980s, libertarians such as Paul and Rothbard criticized President Reagan, Reaganomics and policies of the Reagan administration for, among other reasons, having turned the United States' big trade deficit into debt and the United States became a debtor nation for the first time since World War I under the Reagan administration. Rothbard argued that the presidency of Reagan has been "a disaster for libertarianism in the United States" and Paul described Reagan himself as "a dramatic failure".

=== 21st century ===
In the 21st century, libertarian groups have been successful in advocating tax cuts and regulatory reform. While some argue that the American public as a whole shifted away from libertarianism following the fall of the Soviet Union, citing the success of multinational organizations such as NAFTA and the increasingly interdependent global financial system, others argue that libertarian ideas have moved so far into the mainstream that many Americans who do not identify as libertarian now hold libertarian views. Circa 2006 polls find that the views and voting habits of between 10 and 20 percent (increasing) of voting age Americans may be classified as "fiscally conservative and socially liberal, or libertarian". This is based on pollsters and researchers defining libertarian views as fiscally conservative and socially liberal (based on the common United States meanings of the terms) and against government intervention in economic affairs and for expansion of personal freedoms. Through 20 polls on this topic spanning 13 years, Gallup found that voters who are libertarian on the political spectrum ranged from 17 to 23% of the electorate. While libertarians make up a larger portion of the electorate than the much-discussed "soccer moms" and "NASCAR dads", this is not widely recognized as most of these vote for Democratic and Republican party candidates, leading some libertarians to believe that dividing people's political leanings into "conservative", "liberal" and "confused" is not valid.

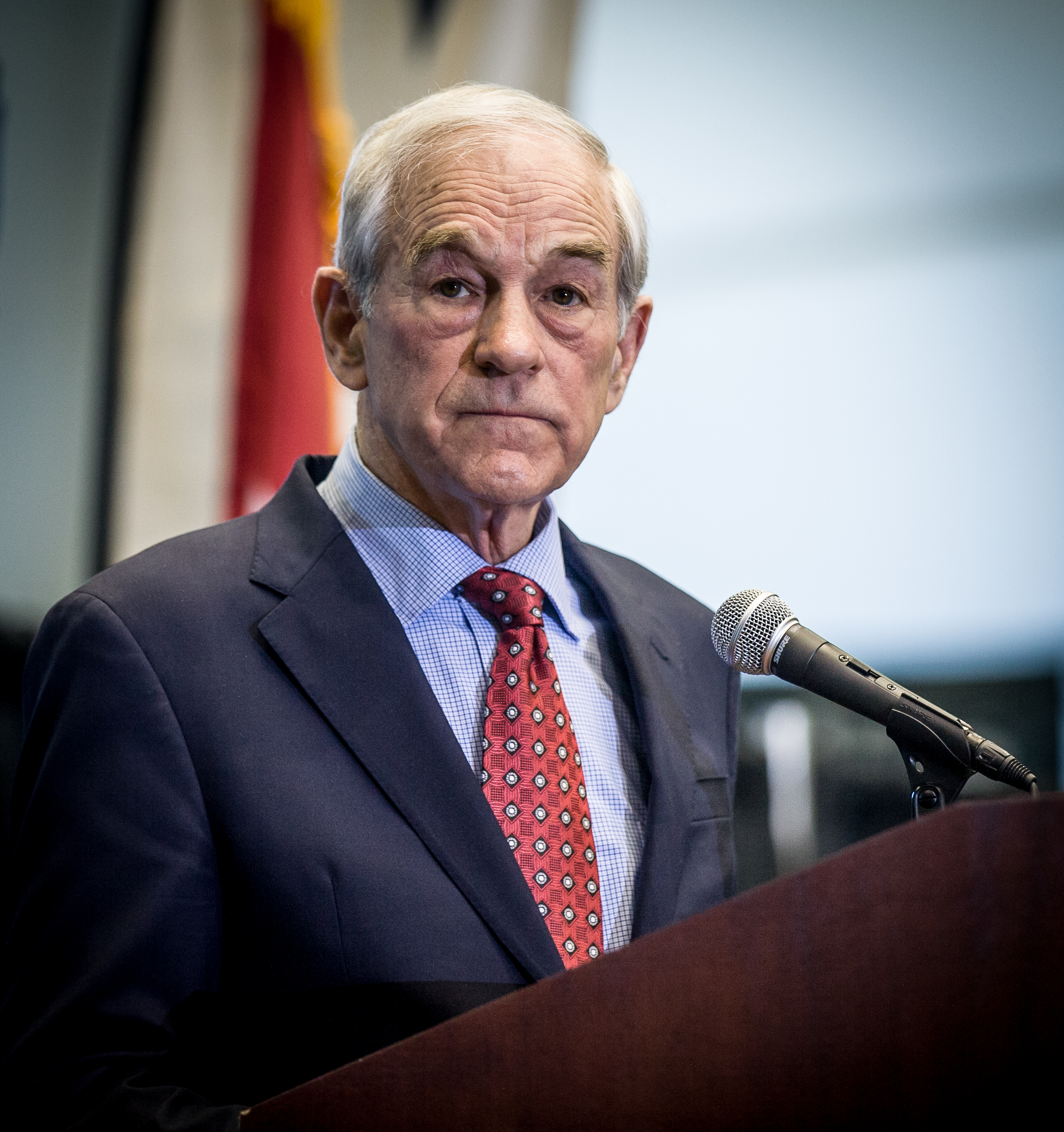
Former United States Rep. Ron Paul of Texas, who set off a surge of libertarian ideology in the US while running for head of state in 2008 and 2012

In the United States, libertarians may emphasize economic and constitutional rather than religious and personal policies, or personal and international rather than economic policies such as the Tea Party movement (founded in 2009) which has become a major outlet for libertarian Republican ideas, especially rigorous adherence to the Constitution, lower taxes and an opposition to a growing role for the federal government in health care. However, polls show that many people who identify as Tea Party members do not hold traditional libertarian views on most social issues and tend to poll similarly to socially conservative Republicans.

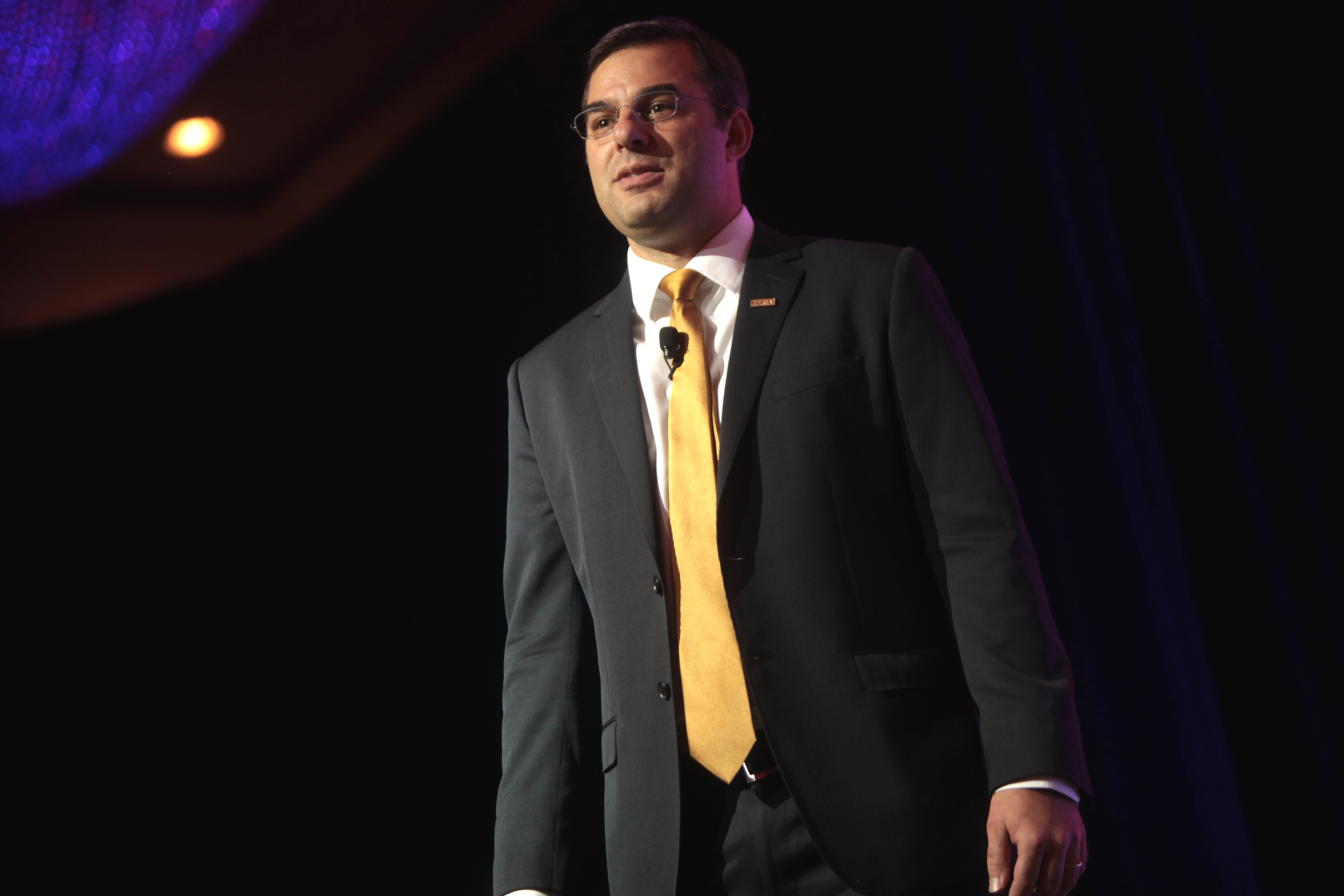
Only member of the Libertarian Party to hold a seat in the United States Congress, Michigan Rep. Justin Amash

During the 2016 presidential election, many Tea Party members eventually abandoned more libertarian-leaning views in favor of Donald Trump and his right-wing populism. Additionally, the Tea Party was considered to be a key force in Republicans reclaiming control of the House of Representatives in 2010. Texas Congressman Ron Paul's 1988, 2008 and 2012 campaigns for the Republican Party presidential nomination were largely libertarian. Along with Goldwater and others, Paul popularized laissez-faire economics and libertarian rhetoric in opposition to interventionism and worked to pass some reforms. Likewise, California Governor and future President of the United States Ronald Reagan appealed to cultural conservative libertarians due its social conservatism and in a 1975 interview with Reason stated: "I believe the very heart and soul of conservatism is libertarianism". However, many libertarians are ambivalent about Reagan's legacy as president due its social conservatism and how the Reagan administration turned the United States' big trade deficit into debt, making the United States a debtor nation for the first time since World War I. Ron Paul was affiliated with the libertarian-leaning Republican Liberty Caucus and founded the Campaign for Liberty, a libertarian-leaning membership and lobbying organization. Rand Paul is a Senator who continues the tradition of his father Ron Paul, albeit more moderately as he has described himself as a constitutional conservative and has both embraced and rejected libertarianism.

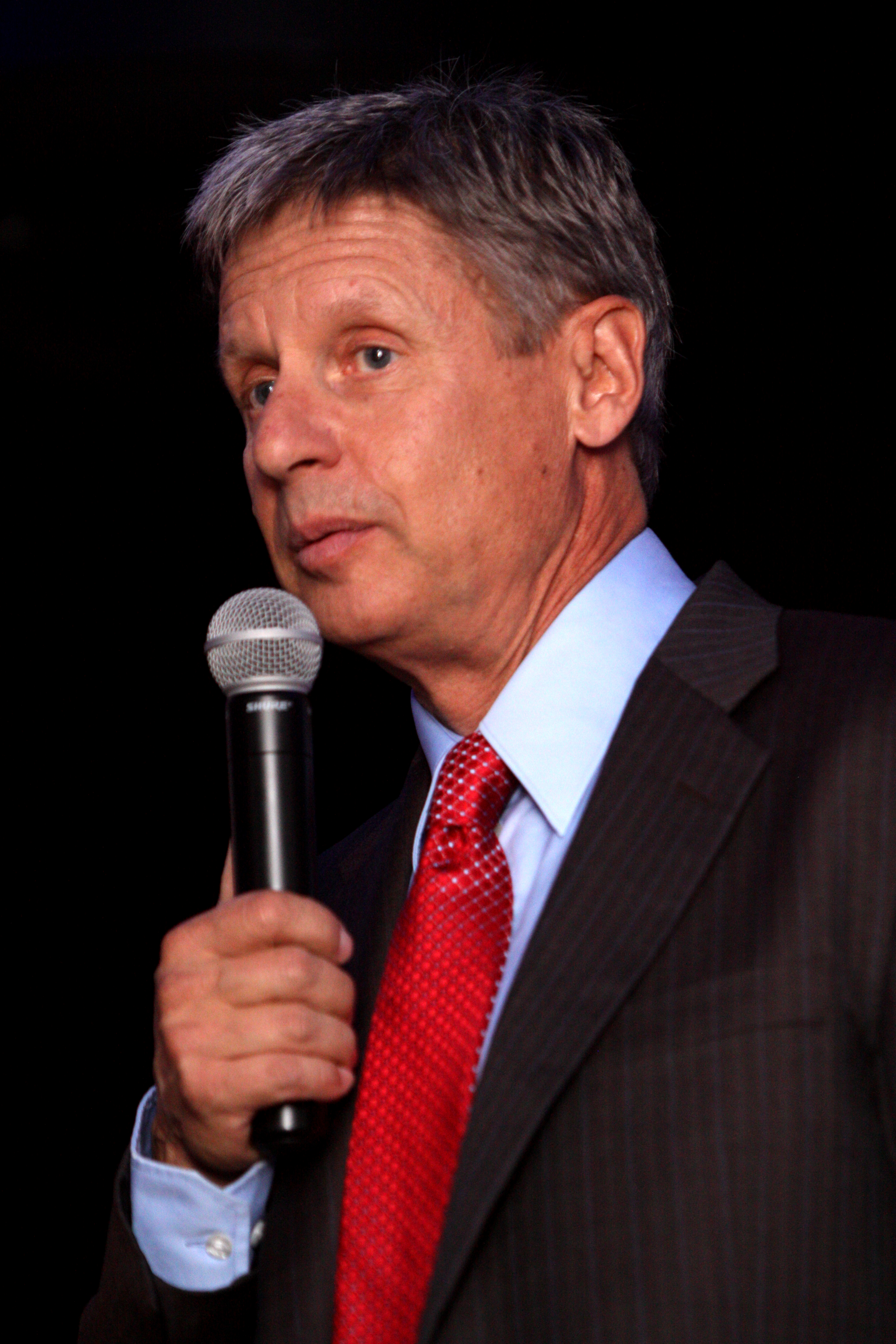
Former New Mexico Gov. Gary Johnson, nicknamed "Governor Veto", ran for head of state within the Libertarian Party in 2012 and 2016.

Since 2012, former New Mexico Governor and two-time Libertarian Party presidential nominee Gary Johnson has been one of the public faces of the libertarian movement. The 2016 Libertarian National Convention saw Johnson and Bill Weld nominated as the 2016 presidential ticket and resulted in the most successful result for a third-party presidential candidacy since 1996 and the best in the Libertarian Party's history by vote number. Johnson received 3% of the popular vote, amounting to more than 4.3 million votes. Johnson expressed a desire to win at least 5% of the vote so that the Libertarian Party candidates could get equal ballot access and federal funding, ending the two-party system. While some political commentators have described Senator Rand Paul and Congressman Thomas Massie of Kentucky as Republican libertarians or libertarian-leaning, they prefer to identify as constitutional conservatives. One federal officeholder openly professing some form of libertarianism is Congressman Justin Amash, who represents Michigan's 3rd congressional district since January 2011. Initially elected to Congress as a Republican, Amash left the party and became an independent in July 2019. In April 2020, Amash joined the Libertarian Party and became the first member of the party in the House of Representatives. Following the 2022 Libertarian National Convention, the Mises Caucus, a paleolibertarian faction, became the dominant faction on the Libertarian National Committee.

A variant of non-intellectual right-libertarianism that has been described as "growing in prominence", "changing the dynamics" of the conservative movement in the U.S., and even "largely defin[ing] the Republican coalition" in the 2020s, has been dubbed "Barstool conservatism". First coined in 2021 by journalist Matthew Walther, the term describes a movement whose primary base of support is young non-religious males, and combines total opposition to political correctness and "wokism" with the more traditional libertarian opposition to controls on the pursuits of pleasure (sex, gambling, pornography, alcohol). In the United States, elements of libertarianism have merged with libertarian authoritarianism and right-wing populist themes. Right-wing libertarian ideals are also prominent in the far-right American militia movement associated with extremist anti-government ideas.

Anti-capitalist libertarianism has recently aroused renewed interest in the early 21st century. The Winter 2006 issue of the Journal of Libertarian Studies published by the Mises Institute was dedicated to reviews of Kevin Carson's Studies in Mutualist Political Economy. One variety of this kind of libertarianism has been a resurgent mutualism, incorporating modern economic ideas such as marginal utility theory into mutualist theory. Carson's Studies in Mutualist Political Economy helped to stimulate the growth of new-style mutualism, articulating a version of the labor theory of value incorporating ideas drawn from Austrian economics.

== Schools of thought ==
=== Consequentialist and deontological libertarianism ===
There are broadly two ethical viewpoints within libertarianism, namely consequentialist libertarianism and deontological libertarianism. The first type is based on consequentialism, only taking into account the consequences of actions and rules when judging them and holds that free markets and strong property rights have good consequences. The second type is based on deontological ethics and is the theory that all individuals possess certain natural or moral rights, mainly a right of individual sovereignty. Acts of initiation of force and fraud are rights-violations and that is sufficient reason to oppose those acts.

Deontological libertarianism is supported by the Libertarian Party. In order to become a card-carrying member, one must sign an oath opposing the initiation of force to achieve political or social goals. Prominent consequentialist libertarians include David D. Friedman, Milton Friedman, Friedrich Hayek, Peter Leeson, Ludwig von Mises and R. W. Bradford. Prominent deontological libertarians include Hans-Hermann Hoppe, Ayn Rand and Murray Rothbard.

In addition to the consequentialist libertarianism as promoted by Hayek, Mark Bevir holds that there is also left and right libertarianism.

=== Left and right libertarianism ===
Left-libertarianism and right-libertarianism is a categorization used by some political analysts, academics and media sources in the United States to contrast related yet distinct approaches to libertarian philosophy. Peter Vallentyne defines right-libertarianism as holding that unowned natural resources "may be appropriated by the first person who discovers them, mixes her labor with them, or merely claims them—without the consent of others, and with little or no payment to them". He contrasts this with left-libertarianism, where such "unappropriated natural resources belong to everyone in some egalitarian manner". Similarly, Charlotte and Lawrence Becker maintain that left-libertarianism most often refers to the political position that holds natural resources are originally common property while right-libertarianism is the political position that considers them to be originally unowned and therefore may be appropriated at-will by private parties without the consent of, or owing to, others.

Followers of Samuel Edward Konkin III, who characterized agorism as a form of left-libertarianism and strategic branch of market anarchism, use the terminology as outlined by Roderick T. Long, who describes left-libertarianism as "an integration, or I'd argue, a reintegration of libertarianism with concerns that are traditionally thought of as being concerns of the left. That includes concerns for worker empowerment, worry about plutocracy, concerns about feminism and various kinds of social equality". Konkin defined right-libertarianism as an "activist, organization, publication or tendency which supports parliamentarianism exclusively as a strategy for reducing or abolishing the state, typically opposes Counter-Economics, either opposes the Libertarian Party or works to drag it right and prefers coalitions with supposedly 'free-market' conservatives".

While holding that the important distinction for libertarians is not left or right, but whether they are "government apologists who use libertarian rhetoric to defend state aggression", Anthony Gregory describes left-libertarianism as maintaining interest in personal freedom, having sympathy for egalitarianism and opposing social hierarchy, preferring a liberal lifestyle, opposing big business and having a New Left opposition to imperialism and war. Right-libertarianism is described as having interest in economic freedom, preferring a conservative lifestyle, viewing private business as a "great victim of the state" and favoring a non-interventionist foreign policy, sharing the Old Right's "opposition to empire".

Although some libertarians such as Walter Block, Harry Browne, Leonard Read and Murray Rothbard reject the political spectrum (especially the left–right political spectrum) whilst denying any association with both the political right and left, other libertarians such as Kevin Carson, Karl Hess, Roderick T. Long and Sheldon Richman have written about libertarianism's left-wing opposition to authoritarian rule and argued that libertarianism is fundamentally a left-wing position. Rothbard himself previously made the same point, rejecting the association of statism with the left.

=== Thin and thick libertarianism ===
Thin and thick libertarianism are two kinds of libertarianism. Thin libertarianism deals with legal issues involving the non-aggression principle only and would permit a person to speak against other groups as long as they did not support the initiation of force against others. Walter Block is an advocate of thin libertarianism. Jeffrey Tucker describes thin libertarianism as "brutalism" which he compares unfavorably to "humanitarianism".

Thick libertarianism goes further to also cover moral issues. Charles W. Johnson describes four kinds of thickness, namely thickness for application, thickness from grounds, strategic thickness and thickness from consequences. Thick libertarianism is sometimes viewed as more humanitarian than thin libertarianism. Wendy McElroy has stated that she would leave the movement if thick libertarianism prevails.

Stephan Kinsella rejects the dichotomy altogether, writing: "I have never found the thick-thin paradigm to be coherent, consistent, well-defined, necessary, or even useful. It's full of straw men, or seems to try to take credit for quite obvious and uncontroversial assertions".

== Organizations ==
=== Alliance of the Libertarian Left ===
The Alliance of the Libertarian Left is a left-libertarian organization that includes a multi-tendency coalition of agorists, geolibertarians, green libertarians, left-Rothbardians, minarchists, mutualists and voluntaryists.

=== Cato Institute ===
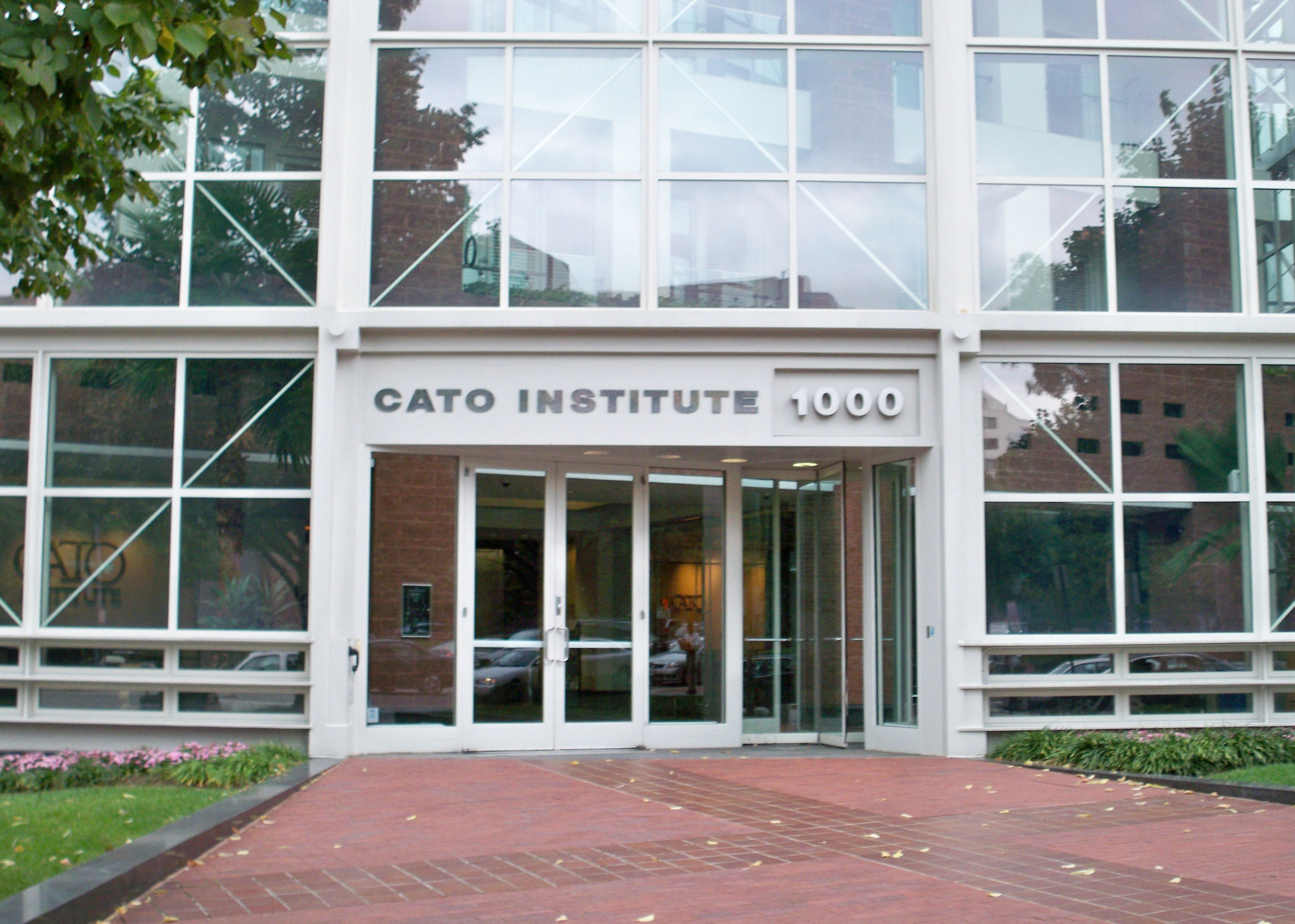
Cato Institute building in Washington, D.C.

The Cato Institute is a libertarian think tank headquartered in Washington, D.C. It was founded as the Charles Koch Foundation in 1974 by Ed Crane, Murray Rothbard and Charles Koch, chairman of the board and chief executive officer of the conglomerate Koch Industries, the second largest privately held company by revenue in the United States. In July 1976, the name was changed to the Cato Institute.

The Cato Institute was established to have a focus on public advocacy, media exposure and societal influence. According to the 2014 Global Go To Think Tank Index Report by the Think Tanks and Civil Societies Program of the University of Pennsylvania, the Cato Institute is number 16 in the "Top Think Tanks Worldwide" and number 8 in the "Top Think Tanks in the United States". The Cato Institute also topped the 2014 list of the budget-adjusted ranking of international development think tanks.

=== Center for Libertarian Studies ===
The Center for Libertarian Studies was a libertarian educational organization founded in 1976 by Murray Rothbard and Burton Blumert which grew out of the Libertarian Scholars Conferences. It published the Journal of Libertarian Studies from 1977 to 2000 (now published by the Mises Institute), a newsletter (In Pursuit of Liberty), several monographs and sponsors conferences, seminars and symposia. Originally headquartered in New York, it later moved to Burlingame, California. Until 2007, it supported LewRockwell.com, web publication of vice president Lew Rockwell. It also had previously supported Antiwar.com, a project of the Randolph Bourne Institute.

=== Center for a Stateless Society ===
The Center for a Stateless Society is a left-libertarian organization and free-market anarchist think tank. Kevin Carson's Studies in Mutualist Political Economy aims to revive interest in mutualism in an effort to synthesize Austrian economics with the labor theory of value by attempting to incorporate both subjectivism and time preference.

=== Foundation for Economic Education ===
The Foundation for Economic Education is a libertarian think tank dedicated to the "economic, ethical and legal principles of a free society". It publishes books and daily articles as well as hosting seminars and lectures.

=== Free State Project ===
The Free State Project is an activist libertarian movement formed in 2001. It is working to bring libertarians to the state of New Hampshire to protect and advance liberty. As of July 2022, the project website showed that 19,988 people have pledged to move and 6,232 people identified as Free Staters in New Hampshire.

Free State Project participants interact with the political landscape in New Hampshire in various ways. In 2017, there were 17 Free Staters in the New Hampshire House of Representatives, and in 2021, the New Hampshire Liberty Alliance, which ranks bills and elected representatives based on their adherence to what they see as libertarian principles, scored 150 representatives as "A−" or above rated representatives. Participants also engage with other like-minded activist groups such as Rebuild New Hampshire, Young Americans for Liberty, and Americans for Prosperity.

=== Libertarian Party ===
The Libertarian Party is a political party that promotes civil liberties, non-interventionism, laissez-faire capitalism and limiting the size and scope of government. The first-world such libertarian party, it was conceived in August 1971 at meetings in the home of David Nolan in Westminster, Colorado, in part prompted due to concerns about the Nixon administration, the Vietnam War, conscription and the introduction of fiat money. It was officially formed on December 11, 1971, in Colorado Springs, Colorado. The Libertarian Party asserts the following core beliefs of libertarianism: "Libertarians support maximum liberty in both personal and economic matters. They advocate a much smaller government; one that is limited to protecting individuals from coercion and violence. Libertarians tend to embrace individual responsibility, oppose government bureaucracy and taxes, promote private charity, tolerate diverse lifestyles, support the free market, and defend civil liberties."

=== Liberty International ===
The Liberty International is a non-profit, libertarian educational organization based in San Francisco. It encourages activism in libertarian and individual rights areas by the freely chosen strategies of its members. Its history dates back to 1969 as the Society for Individual Liberty founded by Don Ernsberger and Dave Walter.

The previous name of the Liberty International as the International Society for Individual Liberty was adopted in 1989 after a merger with the Libertarian International was coordinated by Vince Miller, who became president of the new organization.

=== Mises Institute ===
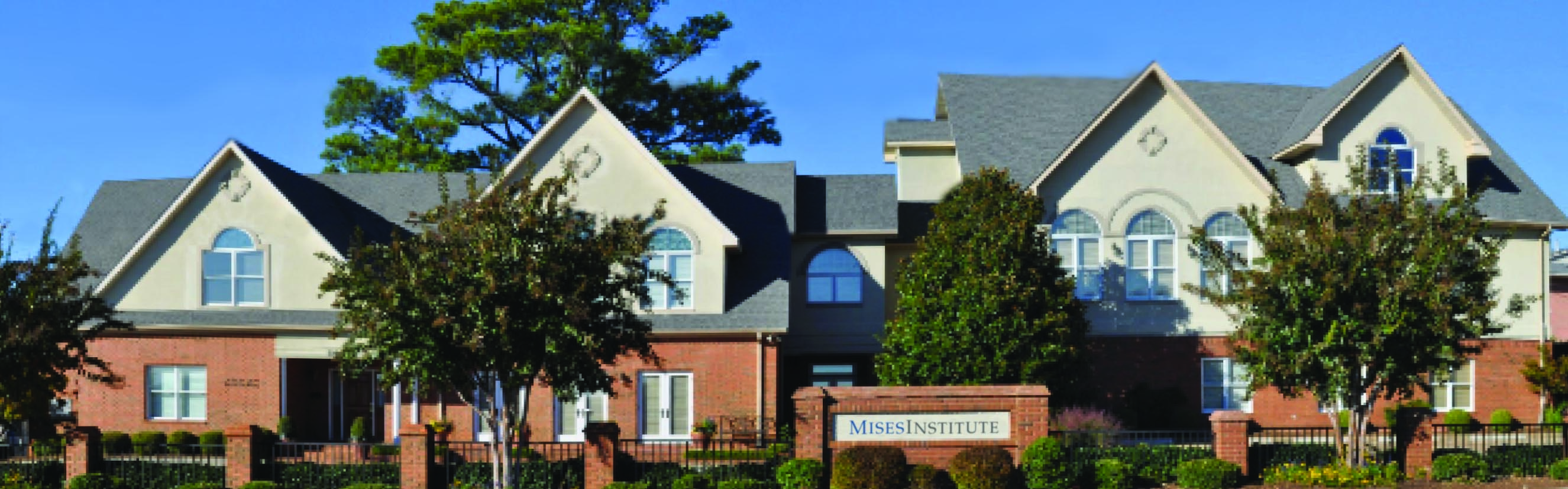
Campus of the Mises Institute in Auburn, Alabama

The Mises Institute is a tax-exempt, libertarian educative organization located in Auburn, Alabama. Named after Austrian School economist Ludwig von Mises, its website states that it exists to promote "teaching and research in the Austrian school of economics, and individual freedom, honest history, and international peace, in the tradition of Ludwig von Mises and Murray N. Rothbard". According to the Mises Institute, Nobel Prize winner Friedrich Hayek served on their founding board.

The Mises Institute was founded in 1982 by Lew Rockwell, Burton Blumert and Murray Rothbard following a split between the Cato Institute and Rothbard, who had been one of the founders of the Cato Institute. Additional backing came from Mises's wife Margit von Mises, Henry Hazlitt, Lawrence Fertig and Nobel Economics laureate Friedrich Hayek. Through its publications, the Mises Institute promotes libertarian political theories, Austrian School economics and a form of heterodox economics known as praxeology ("the logic of action").

=== Molinari Institute ===
The Molinari Institute is a left-libertarian, free-market anarchist organization directed by philosopher Roderick T. Long. It is named after Gustave de Molinari, whom Long terms the "originator of the theory of Market Anarchism".

=== Reason Foundation ===
The Reason Foundation is a libertarian think tank and non-profit and tax-exempt organization that was founded in 1978. It publishes the magazine Reason and is committed to advancing "the values of individual freedom and choice, limited government, and market-friendly policies". In the 2014 Global Go To Think Tank Index Report by the Think Tanks and Civil Societies Program of the University of Pennsylvania, the Reason Foundation was number 41 out of 60 in the "Top Think Tanks in the United States".

== People ==
=== Intellectual sources ===
- Stephen Pearl Andrews – individualist anarchist and mutualist
- Enrico Arrigoni – individualist anarchist and member of the Libertarian League
- Walter Block – Austrian School economist in the Rothbardian tradition, author of Defending the Undefendable and Yes to Ron Paul and Liberty
- Murray Bookchin – libertarian socialist philosopher and member of the Libertarian League
- Kevin Carson – social theorist, mutualist and left-libertarian
- Gary Chartier – legal scholar and left-libertarian philosopher
- Roy Childs – essayist and critic
- Joseph Déjacque – libertarian communist who first coined the word libertarian in political philosophy and publisher of Libertarian: Journal of Social Movement
- Sam Dolgoff – anarcho-syndicalist who co-founded the Libertarian League
- Ralph Waldo Emerson – individualist philosopher, whose "Politics" essay belies his feelings on government and the state
- Richard Epstein – legal scholar, specializing in the field of law and economics
- David D. Friedman – anarcho-capitalist economist of the Chicago school, author of The Machinery of Freedom and son of Milton Friedman
- Milton Friedman – Nobel Prize-winning monetarist economist associated with the Chicago school and advocate of economic deregulation and privatization
- William Batchelder Greene – individualist anarchist and mutualist
- Friedrich Hayek – Nobel Prize-winning Austrian School economist and classical liberal, notable for his political work The Road to Serfdom
- Robert A. Heinlein – science-fiction author who considered himself to be a libertarian
- Karl Hess – speechwriter and libertarian activist
- Hans-Hermann Hoppe – political philosopher and paleolibertarian trained under the Frankfurt School, staunch critic of democracy and developer of argumentation ethics
- John Hospers – philosopher and political activist
- Michael Huemer – political philosopher, ethical intuitionist and author of The Problem of Political Authority
- David Kelley – Objectivist philosopher open to libertarianism and founder of The Atlas Society
- Stephan Kinsella – deontological anarcho-capitalist and opponent of intellectual property
- Samuel Edward Konkin III – author of the New Libertarian Manifesto and proponent of agorism and counter-economics
- Rose Wilder Lane – silent editor of her mother's Little House on the Prairie books and author of The Discovery of Freedom
- Robert LeFevre – businessman and primary theorist of autarchism
- H. L. Mencken – journalist who privately called himself libertarian
- Ludwig von Mises – prominent figure in the Austrian School, classical liberal and founder of the a priori economic method of praxeology
- Jan Narveson – political philosopher and opponent of the Lockean proviso
- Albert Jay Nock – author, editor of The Freeman and The Nation, Georgist and outspoken opponent of the New Deal
- Robert Nozick – multidisciplinary philosopher, minarchist, critic of utilitarianism and author of Anarchy, State, and Utopia
- Isabel Paterson – author of The God of the Machine who has been called one of the three founding mothers of libertarianism in the United States
- Ronald Radosh – historian and former Marxist who became a New Left and anti-Vietnam War activist
- Ayn Rand – philosophical novelist and founder of Objectivism who accused libertarians of haphazardly plagiarizing her ideas
- Leonard Read – founder of the Foundation for Economic Education
- Lew Rockwell – anarcho-capitalist writer, purveyor of LewRockwell.com and co-founder of paleolibertarianism
- Murray Rothbard – Austrian School economist, prolific author and polemicist, founder of anarcho-capitalism and co-founder of paleolibertarianism
- Chris Matthew Sciabarra – political theorist and advocate of dialectical libertarianism
- Thomas Sowell – economist, social theorist, political philosopher and author
- Lysander Spooner – individualist anarchist and mutualist
- Clarence Lee Swartz – individualist anarchist and mutualist
- Henry David Thoreau – author of Civil Disobedience, an argument for disobedience to an unjust state
- Benjamin Tucker – individualist anarchist and libertarian socialist
- Dave Van Ronk – folk singer and member of the Libertarian League
- Laura Ingalls Wilder – writer who became dismayed with the New Deal and has been referred to as one of the first libertarians in the United States

=== Politicians ===
- Justin Amash – Representative from Michigan
- Eric Brakey – State Representative from Maine and 2018 Senate candidate
- Nick Freitas – State Delegate from Virginia and 2018 Senate candidate
- Barry Goldwater – former Senator from Arizona and 1964 presidential candidate
- Glenn Jacobs (better known as Kane) – professional wrestler, libertarian Republican and Mayor of Knox County, Tennessee since September 2018
- Gary Johnson – former New Mexico Governor and 2012 and 2016 Libertarian Party presidential nominee
- Jo Jorgensen – Libertarian Party vice presidential nominee in 1996 and 2020 Libertarian Party presidential nominee
- Mike Lee – Senator from Utah
- Thomas Massie – Representative from Kentucky
- David Nolan – founder of the Libertarian Party
- Rand Paul – Senator from Kentucky and 2016 presidential candidate
- Ron Paul – former Representative from Texas and 1988, 2008 and 2012 presidential candidate
- Austin Petersen – 2016 Libertarian Party presidential candidate and 2018 Republican Missouri Senate candidate
- Stan Jones (Libertarian politician) - 2002 and 2006 ran for U.S. Senate, and in 2000, 2004, and 2008 ran for governor of Montana as libertarian candidate.

=== Political commentators ===
- Nick Gillespie – Reason contributing editor
- Scott Horton – editorial director of Antiwar.com
- Lisa Kennedy Montgomery – host of Kennedy
- Mary O'Grady – editor of The Wall Street Journal
- John Stossel – host of Stossel
- Katherine Timpf – Fox News contributor
- Matt Welch – editor-in-chief of Reason
- Thomas Woods – host of The Tom Woods Show

== Contentions ==
=== Political spectrum ===
The Nolan Chart, a political spectrum diagram created by libertarian activist David Nolan

Corey Robin describes libertarianism as fundamentally a conservative ideology united with more traditionalist conservative thought and goals by a desire to retain hierarchies and traditional social relations. Others also describe libertarianism as a reactionary ideology for its support of laissez-faire capitalism and a major reversal of the modern welfare state.

In the 1960s, Rothbard started the publication Left and Right: A Journal of Libertarian Thought, believing that the left–right political spectrum had gone "entirely askew". Since conservatives were sometimes more statist than liberals, Rothbard tried to reach out to leftists. In 1971, Rothbard wrote about his view of libertarianism which he described as supporting free trade, property rights and self-ownership. He would later describe his brand of libertarianism as anarcho-capitalism and paleolibertarianism.

Anthony Gregory points out that within the libertarian movement, "just as the general concepts "left" and "right" are riddled with obfuscation and imprecision, left- and right-libertarianism can refer to any number of varying and at times mutually exclusive political orientations". Some libertarians reject association with either the right or the left. Leonard Read wrote an article titled "Neither Left Nor Right: Libertarians Are Above Authoritarian Degradation". Harry Browne wrote: "We should never define Libertarian positions in terms coined by liberals or conservatives—nor as some variant of their positions. We are not fiscally conservative and socially liberal. We are Libertarians, who believe in individual liberty and personal responsibility on all issues at all times".

Tibor R. Machan titled a book of his collected columns Neither Left Nor Right. Walter Block's article "Libertarianism Is Unique and Belongs Neither to the Right Nor the Left" critiques libertarians he described as left (C. John Baden, Randy Holcombe and Roderick T. Long) and right (Edward Feser, Hans-Hermann Hoppe and Ron Paul). Block wrote that these left and right individuals agreed with certain libertarian premises, but "where we differ is in terms of the logical implications of these founding axioms". On the other hand, libertarians such as Kevin Carson, Karl Hess, Roderick T. Long and Sheldon Richman consciously label themselves as left-libertarians.

=== Objectivism ===
Objectivism is a philosophical system developed by Russian-American writer Ayn Rand. Rand first expressed Objectivism in her fiction, most notably We the Living (1936), The Fountainhead (1943) and Atlas Shrugged (1957), but also in later non-fiction essays and books such as The Virtue of Selfishness (1964) and Capitalism: The Unknown Ideal (1966), among others. Leonard Peikoff, a professional philosopher and Rand's designated intellectual heir, later gave it a more formal structure. Rand described Objectivism as "the concept of man as a heroic being, with his own happiness as the moral purpose of his life, with productive achievement as his noblest activity, and reason as his only absolute". Peikoff characterizes Objectivism as a "closed system" that is not subject to change.

Objectivism's central tenets are that reality exists independently of consciousness, that human beings have direct contact with reality through sense perception, that one can attain objective knowledge from perception through the process of concept formation and inductive logic, that the proper moral purpose of one's life is the pursuit of one's own happiness, that the only social system consistent with this morality is one that displays full respect for individual rights embodied in laissez-faire capitalism and that the role of art in human life is to transform humans' metaphysical ideas by selective reproduction of reality into a physical form—a work of art—that one can comprehend and to which one can respond emotionally. The Objectivist movement founded by Rand attempts to spread her ideas to the public and in academic settings.

Objectivism has been, and continues to be, a major influence on the libertarian movement. Many libertarians justify their political views using aspects of Objectivism. However, the views of Rand and her philosophy among prominent libertarians are mixed and many Objectivists are hostile to libertarians in general. Nonetheless, Objectivists such as David Kelley and his Atlas Society have argued that Objectivism is an "open system" and are more open to libertarians. Although academic philosophers have mostly ignored or rejected Rand's philosophy, Objectivism has been a significant influence among conservatives and libertarians in the United States.

== Analysis, reception and criticism ==
Criticism of libertarianism includes ethical, economic, environmental, pragmatic and philosophical concerns, including the view that it has no explicit theory of liberty. It has been argued that laissez-faire capitalism does not necessarily produce the best or most efficient outcome and that its philosophy of individualism as well as policies of deregulation do not prevent the exploitation of natural resources.

Michael Lind has observed that of the 195 countries in the world today, none have fully actualized a society as advocated by libertarians, arguing: "If libertarianism was a good idea, wouldn't at least one country have tried it? Wouldn't there be at least one country, out of nearly two hundred, with minimal government, free trade, open borders, decriminalized drugs, no welfare state and no public education system?" Lind has criticized libertarianism for being incompatible with democracy and apologetic towards autocracy. In response, libertarian Warren Redlich argues that the United States "was extremely libertarian from the founding until 1860, and still very libertarian until roughly 1930".

Nancy MacLean has argued that libertarianism is a radical right ideology, a characterization that has been disputed by historians and scholars who contend her work contains significant factual errors and misrepresentations of her sources.

=== Left-wing ===
Libertarianism has been criticized by the political left for being pro-business and anti-labor, for desiring to repeal government subsidies to disabled people and the poor and being incapable of addressing environmental issues, therefore contributing to the failure to slow global climate change. Left-libertarians such as Noam Chomsky have characterized libertarian ideologies as being akin to corporate fascism because they aim to remove all public controls from the economy, leaving it solely in the hands of private corporations. Chomsky has also argued that the more radical forms of libertarianism such as anarcho-capitalism are entirely theoretical and could never function in reality due to business' reliance on the state as well as infrastructure and publicly funded subsidies. Another criticism is based on the libertarian theory that a distinction can be made between positive and negative rights, according to which negative liberty (negative rights) should be recognized as legitimate, but positive liberty (positive rights) should be rejected. Socialists also have a different view and definition of liberty, with some arguing that the capitalist mode of production necessarily relies on and reproduces violations of the liberty of members of the working class by the capitalist class such as through exploitation of labor and through alienation from the product of one's labor.

Anarchist critics such as Brian Morris have expressed skepticism regarding libertarians' sincerity in supporting a limited or minimal state, or even no state at all, arguing that anarcho-capitalism does not abolish the state and that anarcho-capitalists "simply replaced the state with private security firms, and can hardly be described as anarchists as the term is normally understood". Peter Sabatini has noted: "Within Libertarianism, Rothbard represents a minority perspective that actually argues for the total elimination of the state. However Rothbard's claim as an anarchist is quickly voided when it is shown that he only wants an end to the public state. In its place he allows countless private states, with each person supplying their own police force, army, and law, or else purchasing these services from capitalist vendors. [...] Rothbard sees nothing at all wrong with the amassing of wealth, therefore those with more capital will inevitably have greater coercive force at their disposal, just as they do now". For Bob Black, libertarians are conservatives and anarcho-capitalists want to "abolish the state to his own satisfaction by calling it something else". Black argues that anarcho-capitalists do not denounce what the state does and only "object to who's doing it". Similarly, Paul Birch has argued that anarcho-capitalism would dissolve into a society of city states.

Other libertarians have criticized what they term propertarianism, with Ursula K. Le Guin contrasting in The Dispossessed (1974) a propertarian society with one that does not recognize private property rights in an attempt to show that property objectified human beings. Left-libertarians such as Murray Bookchin objected to propertarians calling themselves libertarians. Bookchin described three concepts of possession, namely property itself, possession and usufruct, i.e. appropriation of resources by virtue of use.

=== Right-wing ===
From the political right, traditionalist conservative philosopher Russell Kirk criticized libertarianism by quoting T. S. Eliot's expression "chirping sectaries" to describe them. Kirk had questioned the fusionism between libertarian and traditionalist conservatives that marked much of the post-war conservatism in the United States. Kirk stated that "although conservatives and libertarians share opposition to collectivism, the totalist state and bureaucracy, they have otherwise nothing in common" and called the libertarian movement "an ideological clique forever splitting into sects still smaller and odder, but rarely conjugating". Believing that a line of division exists between believers in "some sort of transcendent moral order" and "utilitarians admitting no transcendent sanctions for conduct", he included the libertarians in the latter category. He also berated libertarians for holding up capitalism as an absolute good, arguing that economic self-interest was inadequate to hold an economic system together and that it was even less adequate to preserve order. Kirk believed that by glorifying the individual, the free market and the dog-eat-dog struggle for material success, libertarianism weakened community, promoted materialism and undermined appreciation of tradition, love, learning and aesthetics, all of which in his view were essential components of true community.

Author and professor Carl Bogus states that there were fundamental differences between libertarians and traditionalist conservatives in the United States as libertarians wanted the market to be unregulated as possible while traditionalist conservatives believed that big business, if unconstrained, could impoverish national life and threaten freedom. Libertarians also considered that a strong state would threaten freedom while traditionalist conservatives regarded a strong state, one which is properly constructed to ensure that not too much power accumulated in any one branch, was necessary to ensure freedom.

== See also ==
- Anarchism in the United States
- Factions in the Libertarian Party
- Factions in the Republican Party
- Libertarianism in the United Kingdom
- List of libertarian organizations
- List of libertarians in the United States
- Progressivism in the United States
- Socialism in the United States
- Libertarian science fiction

== Bibliography ==
- Doherty, Brian (2009). Radicals for Capitalism: A Freewheeling History of the Modern American Libertarian Movement. London: Hachette UK. ISBN 978-0786731886.
