= Vince Miller =

Canadian libertarian (1938–2008)

Personal details
- Born: December 11, 1938 London, Ontario, Canada
- Died: June 28, 2008 (aged 69) Benicia, California, U.S.
- Party: Libertarian Party of Canada

Vince Miller (Dec. 11, 1938 – June 28, 2008) was a Canadian libertarian who was one of the founders of the Libertarian Party of Canada in 1975, and later founded Libertarian International in 1980, which by 1989 had merged with Society for Individual Liberty to create the International Society for Individual Liberty (ISIL). Born in Ontario, Miller was the editor of the Libertarian Party of Canada's magazine Libertarian Option.

== Early years ==
According to Jeff Riggenbach, Miller was basically “apolitical for the first three decades of his life,” and spent his time “running, playing the guitar, and getting rich in business.” That changed in 1971 after meeting Marshall Bruce Evoy, who had been an official business representative for the Nathaniel Branden Institute in Toronto.” Thereafter, Miller got involved in political elections as a candidate for parliament and later was elected to president of the LP of Canada. Meanwhile, he learned the typesetting and printing trade to get into the printing business while working briefly in the late 1970s as editor of a magazine for Roger MacBride, the Libertarian Party presidential candidate in 1976. Determined to spread the libertarian message to nations across the globe, Miller established the nonprofit Libertarian International in 1980, and finally set up his first Libertarian International conference in 1982 in Switzerland.

== The ISIL years ==
After the merge, Miller made ISIL the centerpiece of his life, published the newsletter and magazine Freedom News Network (FNN), arranged a yearly international conference that emphasized scholarships for college students, solicited Jarret Wollstein to write more pamphlets (totaling 38 separate titles), and rescued and revitalized the Laissez Faire Books mail-order business. From 1982 to 2008, Miller and James Elwood organized 25 world conferences, mostly located in Europe, North and Central America and Africa, which included such notable personalities as Nobel laureate Milton Friedman. Miller was instrumental in translating a number of books into foreign languages, including Ken Schoolland’s The Adventures of Jonathan Gullible: A Free Market Odyssey, Ayn Rand’s Anthem, Karl Hess’s Capitalism for Kids, Frances Kendall's Super Parents Super Children and Mary Ruwart’s Healing Our World.

Vince Miller died in a hospital while in a coma from Valley Fever.
