= William Gillies =

William Gillies may refer to:

- William Gillies (Australian politician) (1868–1928), Premier of Queensland in 1925
- William Gillies (Scottish politician) (1865–1932), co-founder of the National Party of Scotland
- William Gillies (sport shooter) (1914–1986), Scottish shooter who represented Hong Kong at the Olympics
- William George Gillies (1898–1973), Scottish landscape and still life painter
- William S. Gillies (1911–2000), United States artist
- William King Gillies (1875–1952), Scottish educator and academic author

== See also ==
- Billy Gillies, Northern Irish disc jockey
- William Gilly, biologist
- William Gillis (disambiguation)
