= William Gillis =

William Gillis may refer to:

- Willie Gillis, Norman Rockwell's fictional character
- Willie Gillis, a television character in The Rookies
- Bill Gillis (1936–2009), Canadian politician
- William Gillis (businessman) (1788–1869), American businessman, real estate developer and pioneer
- William Gillis (politician) (1859–1929), British Member of Parliament for Penistone

== See also ==
- William Gillies (disambiguation)
