= Ernest Lesigne =

French journalist and historian

Ernest Lesigne was a 19th-century French journalist and historian.

One of his most famous works he wrote is a series of socialist letters, titled "Socialistic Letters", for the French radical paper Le Radical.
