= Market anarchism =

Branch of anarchism

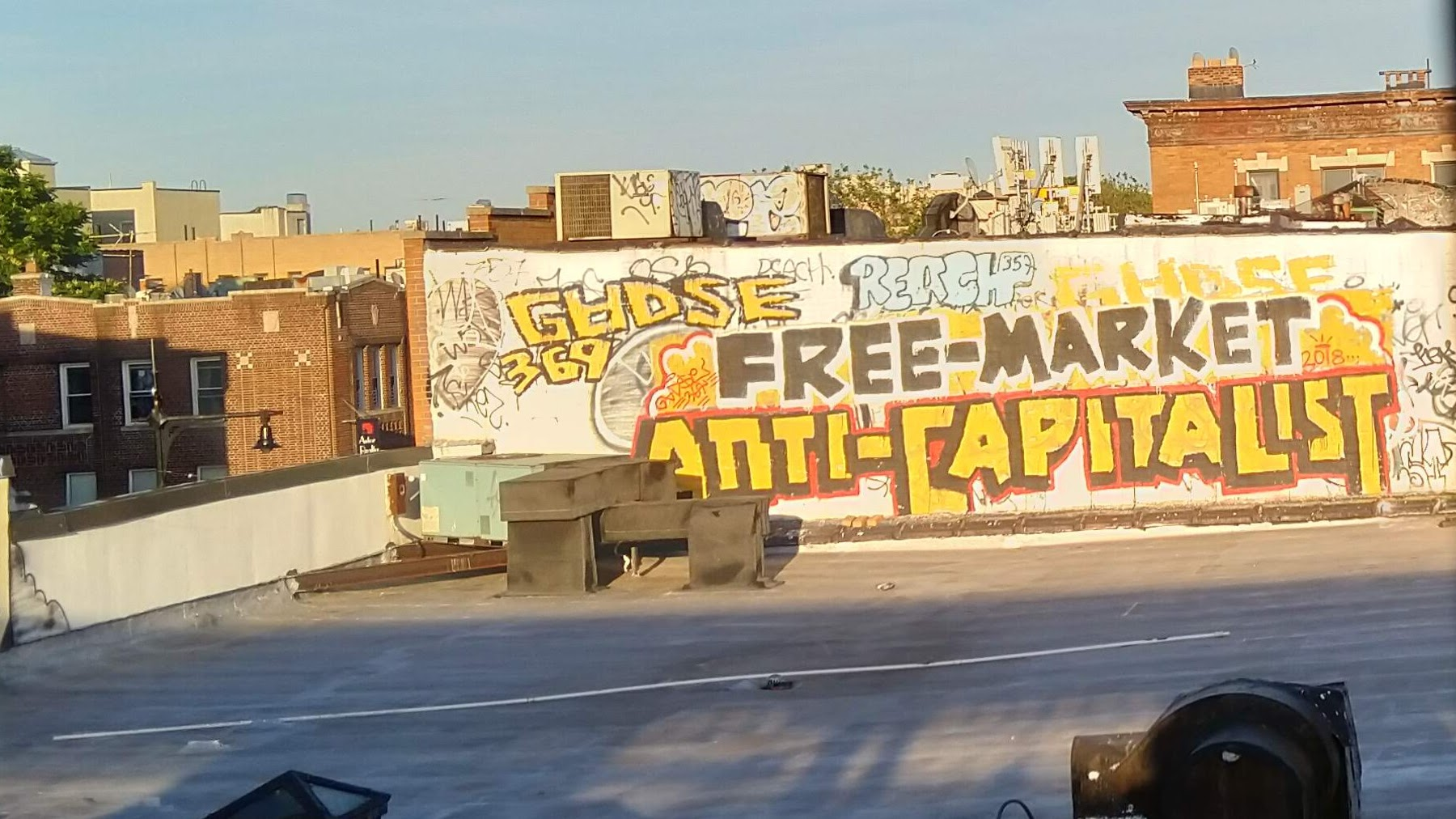
Free-market anti-capitalist mural in Queens

Market anarchism is the branch of anarchism that advocates a free-market economic system based on voluntary interactions without state involvement; a form of individualist anarchism. The basic doctrine of market anarchism is that the legislative, adjudicative, and protective functions are unjustly and inefficiently monopolized by the coercive state, and they should be entirely turned over to the voluntary, consensual market forces. Market anarchism opposes the state and considers it inherently coercive. Gustave de Molinari is considered to be the originator of the theory.

== Variations ==
=== Anarcho-capitalism ===
Anarcho-capitalism is the most prominent view in market anarchism; it was developed primarily by Murray Rothbard, who combined the Austrian School economics of Ludwig von Mises with a natural-rights framework of self-ownership, drawing from 19th-century individualist anarchists. Rothbard considers the state, an institution funded by compulsory taxation and claiming a coercive monopoly on law and defense, inherently illegitimate, stating;

"The State is an inherently illegitimate institution of organized aggression, of organized and regularized crime against the persons and properties of its subjects… a profoundly antisocial institution which lives parasitically off of the productive activities of private citizens."

=== Mutualism and left-wing market anarchism ===
Mutualism is associated with Pierre-Joseph Proudhon; it retains a modified version of the labor theory of value, claiming that prices tend toward the cost of labor under genuine free competition. However, the subjective value and time preference following the Austrian tradition are not outrightly rejected.

This had a significant influence on the formation of Individualist anarchism in the United States, such as that of Benjamin Tucker, and after that, left-wing market anarchism also emerged in related to Kevin Carson, Gary Chartier, Roderick Long, etc.

=== Agorism ===
Agorism, proposed by Canadian-American anarchist Samuel Edward Konkin III, is associated with left-libertarianism; it draws heavily from Austrian economics and rejects anarcho-capitalism's association with big business. Instead, it advocates counter-economics—building black- and grey-market voluntary exchanges outside the state control as a strategy for peacefully dissolving the state.

== Terminology issues ==
Due to contending definitions of the terms 'markets' and 'capitalism' which are not used by free-market anti-capitalists, anarcho-capitalism has been referred to synonymously as "free-market anarchism," but the ideologies differ significantly. The Center for a Stateless Society (C4SS), which Kevin Carson is associated with, is one such group of free-market anti-capitalists; as is Samuel Edward Konkin III's agorism, a tendency associated with left-libertarianism.

Some writers, such as Iain McKay, have been skeptical of this conceptual nomenclature on the grounds that it still leads to misunderstandings about its similarity to anarcho-capitalists. The dispute is not merely semantic; Carson and McKay argue that using "market anarchism" as a synonym of anarcho-capitalism overshadows a distinct, left-wing, anti-capitalist tradition of free market thought stretching back to Proudhon.

== See also ==
- Anarchism and capitalism
- Geolibertarianism
- Issues in anarchism
- Market socialism
- Mutualism
- Ricardian socialism

== Bibliography ==
- Carson, Kevin (2017). "Anarchism and Markets". In Jun, Nathan (ed.). Brill's Companion to Anarchism and Philosophy. Leiden: Brill. pp. 81–119. doi:10.1163/9789004356894_005. ISBN 978-9004356894.
- Chartier, Gary (2014). "Market Democracy, Market Anarchy, and Global Justice". Radicalizing Rawls. Philosophy, Public Policy, and Transnational Law. Palgrave Macmillan. pp. 121–149. doi:10.1057/9781137382979_6. ISBN 978-1137382979.
- Long, Roderick T. (2008). "Market Anarchism as Constitutionalism". In Long, Roderick T.; Machan, Tibor R. (eds.). Anarchism/Minarchism. Routledge. doi:10.4324/9781315566955-11 (inactive 14 November 2026). ISBN 978-1315566955.
- Long, Roderick T. (2012). "Left-Libertarianism, Market Anarchism, Class Conflict and Historical Theories of Distributive Justice". Griffith Law Review. 21 (2): 413–431. doi:10.1080/10383441.2012.10854747.
- Long, Roderick T. (2017). "Anarchism and Libertarianism". In Jun, Nathan (ed.). Brill's Companion to Anarchism and Philosophy. Leiden: Brill. pp. 285–317. doi:10.1163/9789004356894_012. ISBN 978-9004356894.
- Long, Roderick T. (2020). "The Anarchist Landscape". In Chartier, Gary; Van Schoelandt, Chad (eds.). The Routledge Handbook of Anarchy and Anarchist Thought. New York: Routledge. pp. 28–38. doi:10.4324/9781315185255-2. ISBN 978-1315185255. S2CID 228898569.
- Long, Roderick T. (2022). "Anarchism". In Zwolinski, Matt; Ferguson, Benjamin (eds.). The Routledge Companion to Libertarianism. Routledge. pp. 181–203. doi:10.4324/9780367814243-16. ISBN 978-0367814243.
- Vest, J. Martin (2020). "Barbarians in the Agora: American Market Anarchism, 1945–2011". In Chartier, Gary; Van Schoelandt, Chad (eds.). The Routledge Handbook of Anarchy and Anarchist Thought. New York: Routledge. pp. 112–125. doi:10.4324/9781315185255-8. ISBN 978-1315185255. S2CID 228898569.
