= Actually existing capitalism =

"Actually existing capitalism" or "really existing capitalism" is an ironic term used by critics of certain economic systems considered capitalist or neoliberal. The term is used to claim that many economies purportedly practicing capitalism (an economic system characterized by a laissez-faire free-market system) actually have significant state intervention and partnerships between private industry and the state. It is a play on the term actually existing socialism. The term mixed economy is used to describe economies with these attributes. The term seeks to point out discrepancy between capitalism as normally defined and what is labelled as capitalism in practice and to claim that (1) capitalism as defined does not and will not exist and (2) such a "pure" capitalist system is undesirable. The term is used as a response to the economic doctrines that have dominated western economic thought throughout the neoliberal period.

Critics point to the use of regulation to avoiding economic problems such as acute commodities fluctuations, financial market crashes, monopolies and extensive environmental damage as examples of how capitalism as defined does not match actually existing capitalist economic systems. In modern economics discourse, "actually existing capitalism" can be understood as a critique of economics teachings that are focused on having and preserving a free-market or capitalist system. Specifically, the term is primarily directed at the Austrian School or the Chicago school of economics as these are economic schools of thought that strongly advocate for capitalist systems.

== Core characteristics of capitalism ==
The core characteristics of capitalism are (1) the production of commodities which are exchanged on a market; (2) wage labour, and (3) capital goods are in the sphere of private property, as well as public, rather than common property. Proponents often believe in rational utility maximisation on the part of consumers and presuppose perfect competition for economic models.

== Capitalism in practice ==
=== Technical problems with capitalism in practice ===
Perfect competition is only theoretical; it has never existed nor is it possible to exist. Free-market capitalism as defined cannot exist and any economy that claims to be capitalist in this sense is actually some other type of economic system, i.e. only has some free-market capitalist features. "Actually existing capitalism" is also used to imply that current understandings of economics would need to incorporate the impossibility of capitalism and no longer use the definition of capitalism as a starting point with which to analyze an economy.

== See also ==
- Capitalist mode of production (Marxist theory)
- Crony capitalism
- Keynesian economics
- Saltwater and freshwater economics
- Schools of economic thought
- Socialism for the rich and capitalism for the poor
- State capitalism
- Corporate welfare
- Market failure
- Government contractor
- Too big to fail
- Lemon socialism
