= Liberty International (organization) =

Libertarian political organization

Coordinates: 37.7903°N 122.4041°W

- Formation: 1969 (Society for Individual Liberty (SIL)) 1980 (Libertarian International) 1989 (International Society for Individual Liberty) 2016 (Liberty International)
- Type: 501(c)(3) nonprofit
- Tax ID no.: EIN: 54-1512492
- President: Jacek Spendel
- Chair: Dr. Mary Ruwart
- Website: www.liberty-intl.org

'Liberty International (LI) (the public name of the International Society for Individual Liberty, Inc., or ISIL) is a non-profit, libertarian, educational, and networking organization based in Dallas, Texas, dedicated to promoting individual liberty, free markets, civil society, and personal freedom worldwide. Mary Ruwart chairs the organization, and Jacek Spendel serves as president. Board Members include Ken Schoolland, James Lark, Per Bylund, Lobo Tigre, José Luis Cordeiro Mateo, David Walter, and Antonio Saravia.

== History ==
The organization was established on October 2, 1969, by three former members of Young Americans for Freedom (YAF): Don Ernsberger, David Walter, and Jarret Wollstein. It was known for the publication of radical philosophical pamphlets, The Individualist magazine, the initiation of Tax Protest Day and Census Resistance, and the hosting of national conferences. The Liberty International Conference Awards honor global leaders who the organization believes promote the cause of freedom.

The first Liberty International World Conference took place in August 1982 in Zurich, Switzerland, and attracted approximately 70 participants from North America, Western Europe, Australia, Guatemala, and South Africa. In 2025, the 39th World Conference of Liberty International took place in Buenos Aires on the topic “Fighting the State from Within. More than 200 participants from 21 countries gathered. At the event, Argentine president Javier Milei received Liberty International’s 2025 Freedom Torch Award.

In 2024, Liberty International organized its 38th World Conference in Grapevine, Texas. The 40th Liberty International World Conference is scheduled for August 2026 in Kathmandu, Nepal.

== See also ==
- Atlas Network
- Cato Institute
- Students For Liberty
