= Adelaide D. Thayer =

American schoolteacher and writer (1864–1945)

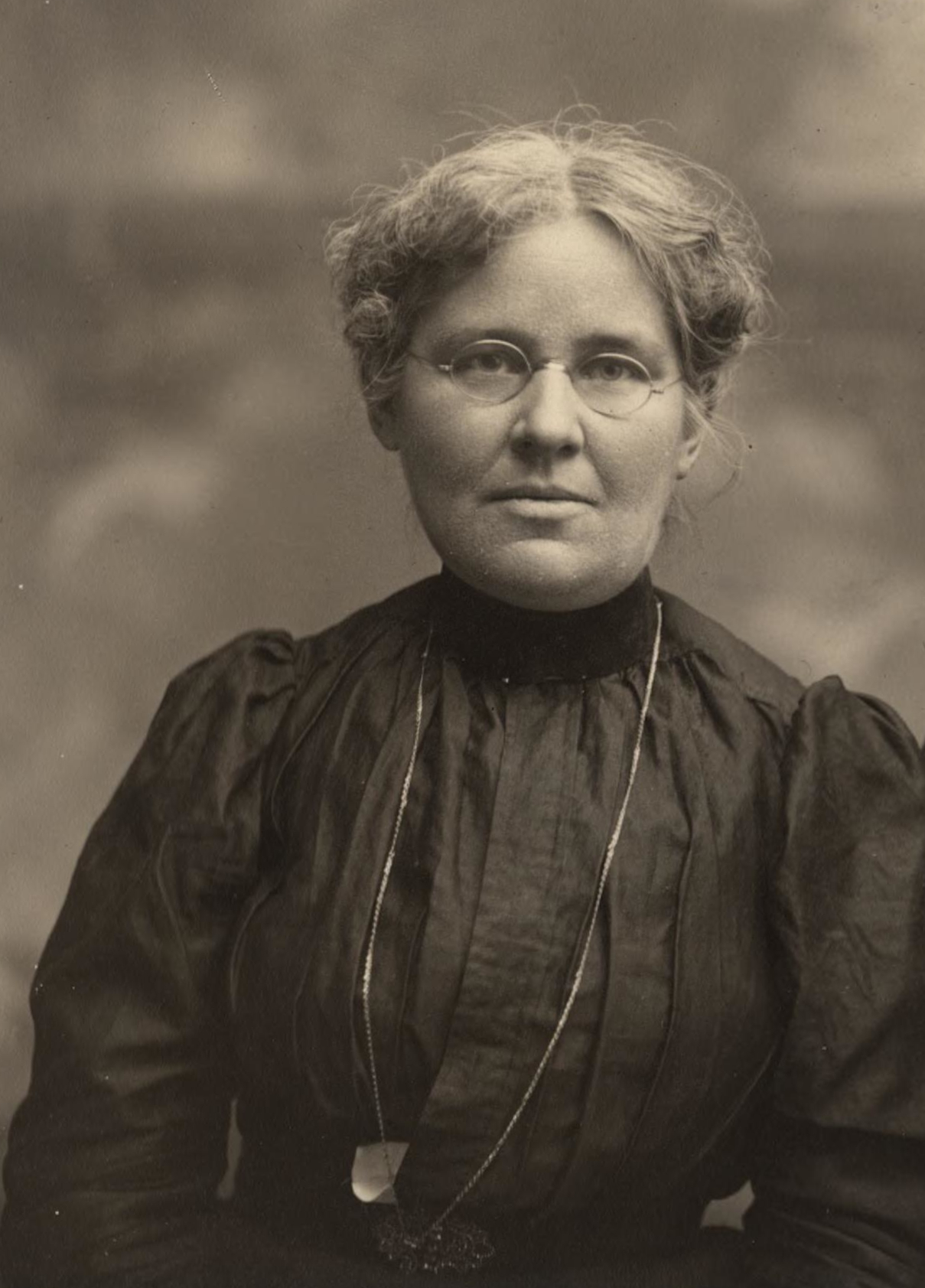
- Thayer in 1905
- Born: Adelaide De Claire; March 10, 1864; Leslie, Michigan, United States
- Died: 1945 (aged 80–81); St. Johns, Michigan, United States
- Other names: "Addie"
- Occupation: Schoolteacher
- Spouses: Franklin Berry (died 1902); Judd Thayer (died 1918)
- Parents: Hector De Claire (father); Harriet De Claire (mother)
- Relatives: Voltairine de Cleyre (sister)

Adelaide De Claire Thayer (1864–1945) was an American schoolteacher and writer. Born into extreme poverty in Michigan, she and her younger sister Voltairine developed a love of reading and writing at an early age. After Adelaide fell ill, Voltairine was sent away to be educated in a convent, but the two kept in touch through letters. They continued to exchange correspondence with each other into adulthood, with Voltairine telling Adelaide of her work as a tutor and public speaker, as well as her romantic partners, although the two disagreed on politics and rarely spoke on the matter. Although Adelaide herself had wanted to become a journalist, her mother pressured her into work as a schoolteacher. She later converted to Baptist denomination and married two working-class men, which her mother disliked. After Voltairine's death, Adelaide became a key primary source in her life and collector of her works, supplying Joseph Ishill and Agnes Inglis with many letters, which are today in the respective collections of Harvard University and the University of Michigan.

== Biography ==
=== Early life ===
Adelaide De Claire was born in Leslie, Michigan, on March 10, 1864. She was the second daughter of Hector, a French tailor and socialist, and Harriet De Claire, who came from a New Englander family involved with the abolitionist movement.

In May 1867, Adelaide's older sister Marion was found dead, having accidentally drowned in a river. She later attributed the incident to "many of the psychological mishaps that came to our family." The family moved to St. Johns, where Adelaide would live for the rest of her life. The family lived in extreme poverty, with the parents both working to provide their children with meager food, clothing and education. Adelaide recalled her and her younger sister Voltairine, unable to buy Christmas presents, would make their parents gifts out of scraps each year. With each passing year, Adelaide's father became increasingly bitter and her mother began to withdraw her affection from her daughters. Adelaide later wrote that her parents' lives had likely been a "disappointment" to them both.

=== Growing up ===
Growing up, Adelaide and Voltairine were passionate readers of British literature, including poems and novels by Wilkie Collins, Charles Dickens and Walter Scott. To Adelaide, literature was one of the few comforts she had, remarking that one of her fondest memories of her childhood was when her mother read her poems by Lord Byron while putting her to sleep each night. Her sister was particularly taken with poetry and began writing her poems at an early age, some of which Adelaide found in her attic many decades later. She sent one of Voltairine's childhood poems to Agnes Inglis, saying: "I want you to see it as I do—the spontaneous out-pouring of her practical nature and reaching for the beauty of expression. I cried as I read it, and am crying now as I write, to think of all the wasted years of misunderstanding, when we were children, when our childish years should have been filled with beauty, as they could have been."

During the 1870s, Adelaide's father left their home to seek work in Port Huron, never returning to St. Johns, but sending the family money when he could. Adelaide recalls feeling that she and her sister "suffered much shame and sorrow in that we were children of separated parents. All the bitter pain of it was ours." In early 1879, Adelaide became very ill, forcing her mother to focus most of her attention on caring for her. Voltairine was sent away to live with her father, who later sent her to be educated at a convent. Adelaide's letters to Voltairine were sometimes withheld by the convent's nuns, who surveilled all correspondence. Adelaide observed that the "horrible, accursed convent" turned Voltairine into a "nervous wreck", recalling that her rebellious sister was "unmercifully punished" with such punishments as enforced social isolation. In the letters she could send back home, Voltairine sent her love to Adelaide and wrote to her about the beauty of the natural landscape that surrounded the convent.

When Adelaide grew up, her mother pressured her to become a schoolteacher, despite her own wishes to have worked as a journalist for a newspaper. She later upset her mother when she converted to a Baptist denomination and when she chose to marry, but Adelaide asserted that she had been "glad to be one of the 'common people' myself. Mother could never see any use, or beauty in service of this kind. She never forgave me for marrying two poor men. But they were real men, and I was always proud that they selected me from the world of women." Despite this, she continued to defend her mother's behavior into old age, telling the Labadie Collection's curator Agnes Inglis: "Don’t judge her too harshly, for she was the youngest of eight children and so she naturally grew up very self-centered."

=== Correspondence with Voltairine ===
Adelaide continued to correspond with her sister into their adulthood, with Voltairine keeping her updated on her work as a tutor, as well as her public speeches and recitations. On one occasion, after a speech she gave, Voltairine remarked to Adelaide that an old man had made her promise to deliver a eulogy at his funeral. When Voltairine came back to St. Johns to visit Adelaide and her mother, they avoided discussing Voltairine's new-found radical politics and non-traditional lifestyle: "Her opinions and mine were very much out-of-step, so we said little about them to each other." Nevertheless, Voltairine continued to write to Adelaide about her travels as a freethinking speaker, writing from Pittsburgh that: "I do see a lot of misery, misery enough to make one’s blood stand still in the veins. But there are many beautiful things too—many wonderful sweet things in this world." After receiving news of the Haymarket affair, Voltairine remarked to Adelaide that the perpetrators of the bombing "ought to be hanged", an exclamation she immediately regretted, especially after Adelaide responded in agreement: "Voltai didn’t like it; she didn’t like the way my words rang in her ears." Voltairine later came to support the Haymarket defendants, whom she thought were falsely accused.

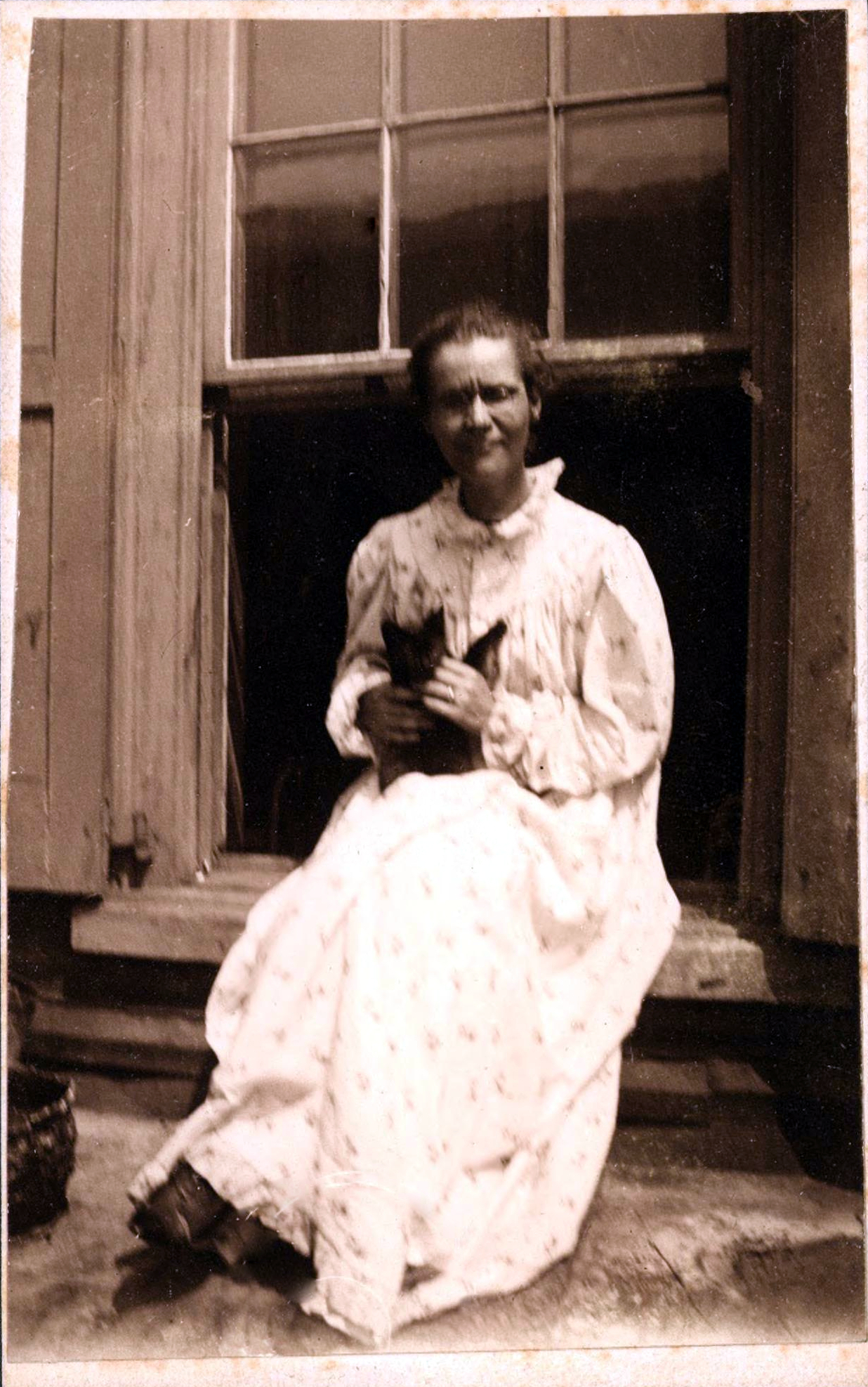
Photograph of Voltairine de Cleyre, taken by Adelaide in August 1898

Adelaide interrupted her sister's busy work schedule in the summer of 1898, with a five-week visit to Philadelphia, during which she took photographs of her sister reading and petting stray cats. During the visit, she met many Voltairine's friends, taking a particular liking to Mary Hansen and Nathan Navro, the latter of whom she described as a "fine man and a good friend." Inspired by her connections with the Jewish anarchist movement, around this time, Voltairine began writing to Adelaide in the affectionate Yiddish manner: "Sisterle". When her mother visited the following year, she expressed worry to Adelaide that Voltairine was spending all her money on others and neglecting herself, saying that the dress Adelaide had given her "was almost the only decent thing she had to wear". When Voltairine stayed at a farm outside Philadelphia in the summer of 1900, she wrote extensively to Adelaide of how much she loved being so close to nature. Voltairine disliked living in cities, once informing Adelaide that she had missed a passing comet that she could not see because of the city's light pollution.

During the 1890s, Adelaide received frequent letters about Voltairine's personal relationships. When Voltairine was rejected by Thomas Hamilton Garside, who she was infatuated with, she was overcome with anguish. Adelaide recalled her "wringing her hands and pacing up and down in the garden, her long, long hair streaming down to her feet behind her as she paced in the garden." When Voltairine later had a son, Harry, Adelaide took pity on him, noting that he had inherited a depression from his mother. As Adelaide was childless, she asked Voltairine if she could take care of raising him; Voltairine responded that she didn't care what was done with the child, but Harry's father James B. Elliott refused to give up custody. When one of Voltairine's subsequent partners, Nahum Berman, succombed to mental illness after their separation and died, Voltairine wrote to Adelaide that "He was one of those strange characters who love life intensely, yet who can never adapt themselves to the condition of it. He was a born savage, a wild man, in his love of nature—and life, life, in every manifestation of it." After she separated with another of her partners, Samuel M. Gordon, in 1900, she wrote to Adelaide that although the two remained friends, "he isn’t satisfied with me because I won’t agree to the regular program of married life (I don’t mean the ceremony but the rest of it—exclusive possession, home, children, all that) so we don’t see each other very often. I'm sorry, but I'll have to stand it. I’ve done the worst of my worrying over it, and have settled down to facts."

By the turn of the century, Adelaide had married Franklin Berry. In the wake of the assassination of Umberto I of Italy by Gaetano Bresci, Voltairine asked her "How would your new husband stand an anarchist in his house?" Voltairine herself spoke in defense of Bresci, sympathising with his motives, so wondered whether Adelaide's family "mightn’t like me around." Voltairine had also expressed to Adelaide her fierce criticism of William McKinley's administration, in the year before the President's own assassination. In any case, Franklin Berry died in 1902. Within a few years, Adelaide had remarried, finding a second husband in Judd Thayer.

When Adelaide's father died in 1906, she hadn't seen him in over two decades, but still expressed her grief for the "poor old man". In July 1909, Voltairine wrote to Adelaide that she was going to be visiting St. Johns, but that her mother "should not expect much help around the house", as she hated cooking. Signing off the letter, Voltairine sent her kind regards to Adelaide's husband, saying "I hope he doesn't suppose me to be a dangerous explosive!" By 1911, when Voltairine was earning enough to send her mother money, she complained to Adelaide that her mother had called it "impractical", saying "mother loves us as much as it is in her broken-down, aged, infirm, and Puritan-poisoned soul to do."

=== Later life and death ===
When Voltairine died in June 1912, Adelaide and her mother travelled from St. Johns to Chicago to attend her funeral. Adelaide recalled one moment when: "as my sister lay in her casket, Mrs. Lucy Parsons stood beside her and arranged a spray of red carnations on it; and a hush fell on the crowd." Adelaide's second husband, Judd Thayer, died in 1918.

Throughout the 1930s, Adelaide wrote several letters about her sister to the anarchist publisher Joseph Ishill and the curator Agnes Inglis, which were respectively collected in Harvard University's Ishill Collection and the University of Michigan's Labadie Collection. In one 1934 letter to Inglis, she said of her family: "Our mother was a remarkable woman. Father was a brilliant man. It is no wonder Voltai was a genius." She also regretted that nobody in her family had recognised neither Voltairine's "beautiful spirit nor soul." During this time, Ishill put her in touch with Emma Goldman, who was writing a biography about Voltairine but had no awareness of Adelaide's existence.

Adelaide De Claire Thayer died in St. Johns in 1945, at the age of eighty-one.

== Bibliography ==
- Avrich, Paul (1978). An American Anarchist: The Life of Voltairine de Cleyre. Princeton: Princeton University Press. ISBN 978-0-691-04657-0.
- DeLamotte, Eugenia (2004). Gates of Freedom: Voltairine de Cleyre and the Revolution of the Mind. University of Michigan Press. doi:10.3998/mpub.11482. ISBN 0-472-09867-5. JSTOR 10.3998/mpub.11482. LCCN 2004006183.
- Marsh, Margaret S. (1978). "The Anarchist-Feminist Response to the "Woman Question" in Late Nineteenth-Century America". American Quarterly. 30 (4): 533–547. doi:10.2307/2712299. JSTOR 2712299.
- Presley, Sharon (2005). "Emma Goldman's 'Voltairine de Cleyre': A Moving but Flawed Tribute". In Sharon, Presley; Sartwell, Crispin (eds.). Exquisite Rebel: The Essays of Voltairine De Cleyre – Anarchist, Feminist, Genius. Albany: State University of New York Press. pp. 27–28. ISBN 978-0-7914-6094-8.
- Sartwell, Crispin (2005). "Priestess of Pity and Vengeance". In Sharon, Presley; Sartwell, Crispin (eds.). Exquisite Rebel: The Essays of Voltairine De Cleyre – Anarchist, Feminist, Genius. Albany: State University of New York Press. pp. 3–16. ISBN 978-0-7914-6094-8.
