= Harriet De Claire =

American seamstress (1836–1927)

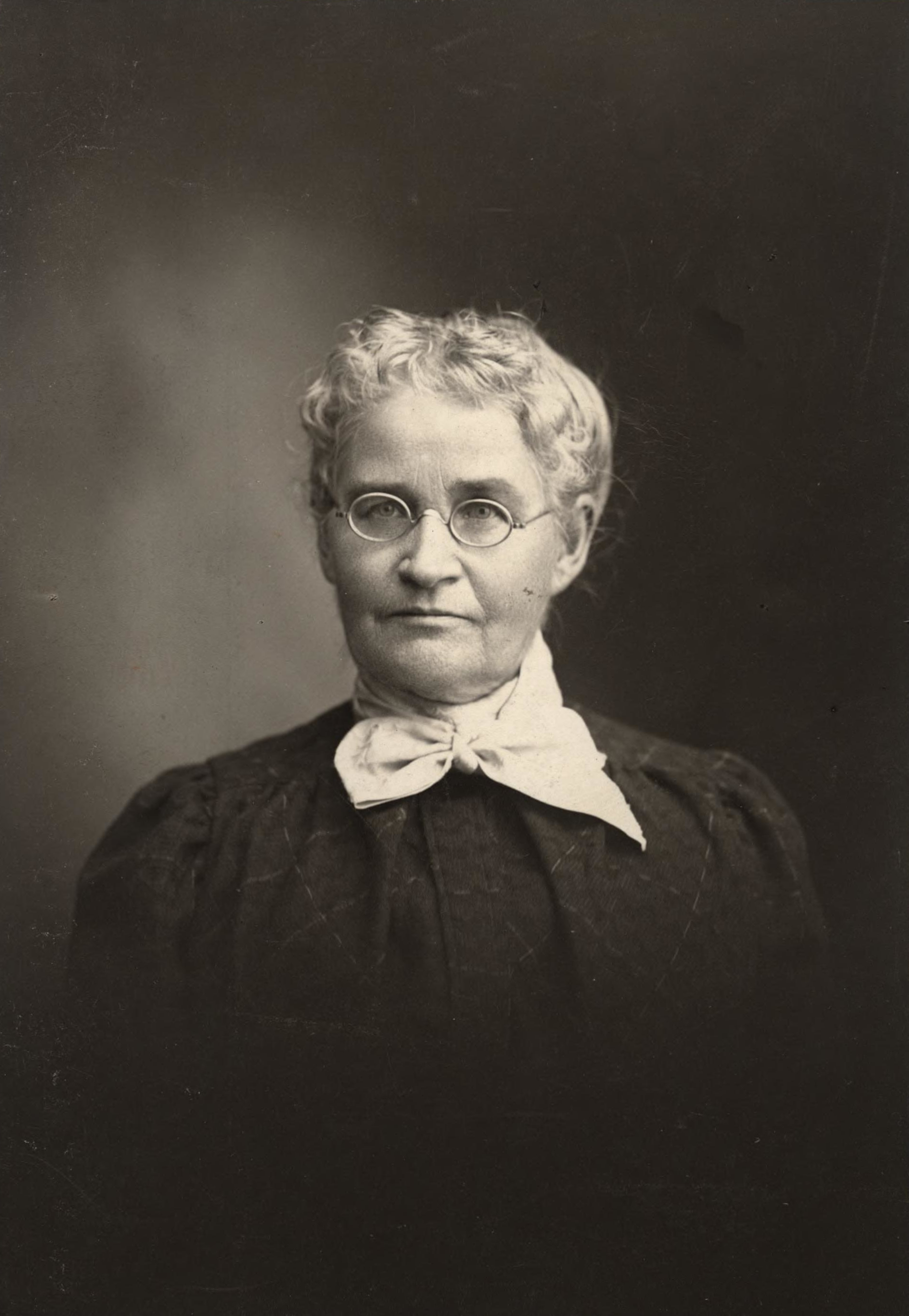
- De Claire (c. 1900)
- Born: Harriet Elizabeth Billings; December 27, 1836; Rochester, New York, United States
- Died: May 27, 1927 (aged 90); St. Johns, Michigan, United States
- Burial place: Maple Grove Cemetery, Comstock, Michigan, United States; 42.26310°N 85.53000°W
- Other name: Harriet de Cleyre
- Occupation: Seamstress
- Spouse: Hector De Claire (m. 1861; sep. 1873)
- Children: Marion; Adelaide; Voltairine
- Parents: Pliny Billings (father); Alice Billings (mother)

Harriet Elizabeth De Claire (née Billings; 1836–1927) was an American seamstress and writer. Born into a Puritan New Englander family associated with the abolitionist movement, she moved to Michigan and married Hector De Claire, with whom she had three daughters. After the death of their oldest daughter, Marion, they moved to St. Johns, where the family lived in extreme poverty. During their childhood, her daughters Adelaide and Voltairine developed a love of reading, which Harriet nurtured with the poetry of Lord Byron. But their financial situation also made Harriet emotionally distant from her children, which Adelaide would come to forgive, but Voltairine would not. After her children grew up, she kept in constant touch with Voltairine, even as her child's politics grew more radical and distant from Harriet's social conservatism. Her correspondence with Voltairine, which lasted up until her death, became a key primary source on her life and was collected in Harvard University's Ishgill Collection and the University of Michigan's Labadie Collection. Harriet De Claire spent the rest of her life in St. Johns, where she died in 1927.

== Biography ==
=== Early life and family ===
Harriet Elizabeth Billings was born on December 27, 1836, in Rochester, New York. The daughter of Pliny and Alice Billings, she was the youngest of eight children. The family were originally New Englanders of Puritan affiliation, who had moved to the burned-over district of New York. Pliny was involved in William Lloyd Garrison's abolitionist movement and helped establish a link of the Underground Railroad in Rochester, where he helped slaves escape to Canada.

=== Marriage and domestic troubles ===
In 1853, Billings moved to Kalamazoo, Michigan, where she met Hector De Claire, whom she married on March 28, 1861. They moved to Leslie, where they had three daughters: Marion (b. May 26, 1862), Adelaide (b. March 10, 1864) and Voltairine (b. November 17, 1866). Hector named their youngest after the French philosopher Voltaire, despite Harriet's protests due to her Puritan social views. In May 1867, their eldest daughter Marion went missing while playing. Harriet went looking for her and found her dead, having drowned in a nearby river. The loss of their first child was psychologically devastating for the De Claires, who subsequently decided to move away to a small house in St. Johns, where Harriet would live for the rest of her life.

The family was plunged into extreme poverty, with Harriet taking up work as a seamstress to supplement Hector's income as a tailor. Despite the financial difficulties, they managed to pay for their daughters' meager food, clothing and education. Unable to afford Christmas presents, Harriet's two daughters made gifts for her out of scraps. In a letter to the anarchist printer Joseph Ishill, Adelaide later wrote that her mother's life may have been a "disappointment" to her. Long stretches of poverty and malnutrition caused Harriet to develop a chronic condition of sinusitis. She also withdrew her affection from her daughters, with Voltairine writing in an 1889 poem:

Some souls there are which never live their life;
Some suns there are which never pierce their cloud;
Some hearts there are which cup their perfume in,
And yield no incense to the outer air.
Cloud-shrouded, flower-cupped heart: such is thine own:
So dost thou live with all thy brightness hid;
So dost thou dwell with all thy perfume close;
Rich in thy treasured wealth, aye, rich indeed—
And they are wrong who say thou "dost not feel."

— Voltairine De Cleyre, "To My Mother", Letter to Harriet De Claire, May 27, 1907

During their childhood, Adelaide and Voltairine enjoyed reading with Harriet, who particularly liked the poetry of Lord Byron. While putting her children to bed, Harriet would often read Byron's poetry to them, which became one of Adelaide's fondest memories of her. Byron's writing style would go on to be a key influence on Voltairine's own poetry. As Voltairine increasingly retreated into the family's maple trees, seeking privacy and a safe place to write her own poetry, Harriet wanted to cut the trees down, but was prevented from doing so by Adelaide. During the 1870s, Hector left the family home to seek work in Port Huron; he never returned, although he sent money to support them. In 1879, when Adelaide became seriously ill, Harriet was left unable to care for both her children alone and sent Voltairine away to live with her father. But Voltairine hated Port Huron, calling it a "nasty hole" in letters to Harriet, in which she expressed her desire to return home. In September 1880, Hector informed Harriet in a letter that he had enrolled Voltairine in a Convent, hoping it would instil discipline within her, "as I doubt not you know she needs." Hector told Harriet that she would need to censor herself while writing to their daughter, as all correspondence was closely monitored by the nuns. After some time adjusting, Voltairine began to express greater happiness with her education in her letters to Harriet, who she reassured that Catholicism was not being imposed on her by the nuns. Due to Harriet's presbyterian affiliations, her daughter had been admitted as a protestant and granted certain privileges that were denied to the Catholic students.

Once they had grown up, Harriet wanted to guide her daughters into appropriate areas of American society. Although Adelaide had wanted to work as a journalist for a newspaper, her mother pressed her to find work as a schoolteacher. Harriet also disapproved of Adelaide's conversion to a Baptist denomination, as well as her marrying two working class men. Adelaide later excused her mother's behavior towards her, attributing it to Harriet being the youngest of eight children, "so she naturally grew up very self-centered." Voltairine herself, although she remained a devoted daughter throughout her life – regularly visiting Harriet and supporting her financially at great cost to herself – wasn't forgiving of her attitude:

I couldn't fulfil your wishes for me, which were probably that I would have entertained your own principles, married some minister or doctor, or been one of them myself, and have a home, children, and a warm room for you—I mean the idea that the parent gives to the hild in youth and the youth returns to the parent in age. All that is utterly foreign to me. I have wanted even less of life than you, for myself. I have cared neither for a home nor any of its addenda. But I have wanted a whole lot of other things, and I've got some of them. I have wanted to travel and see the whole world; I've seen some. I've wanted to print the force of my will—not over-rating it-on the movement towards human liberty. And I have done that, to a certain extent. I have failed in one thing, and that was to hold a place in literature. And I think I have failed partly because I haven't cheek and persistence enough, and mostly because I've always had to do other things. But altogether I think [ve had more satisfaction in my forty years than you in your seventy.

— Voltairine de Cleyre, Letter to Harriet De Claire, May 27, 1907

=== Letters from Voltairine ===
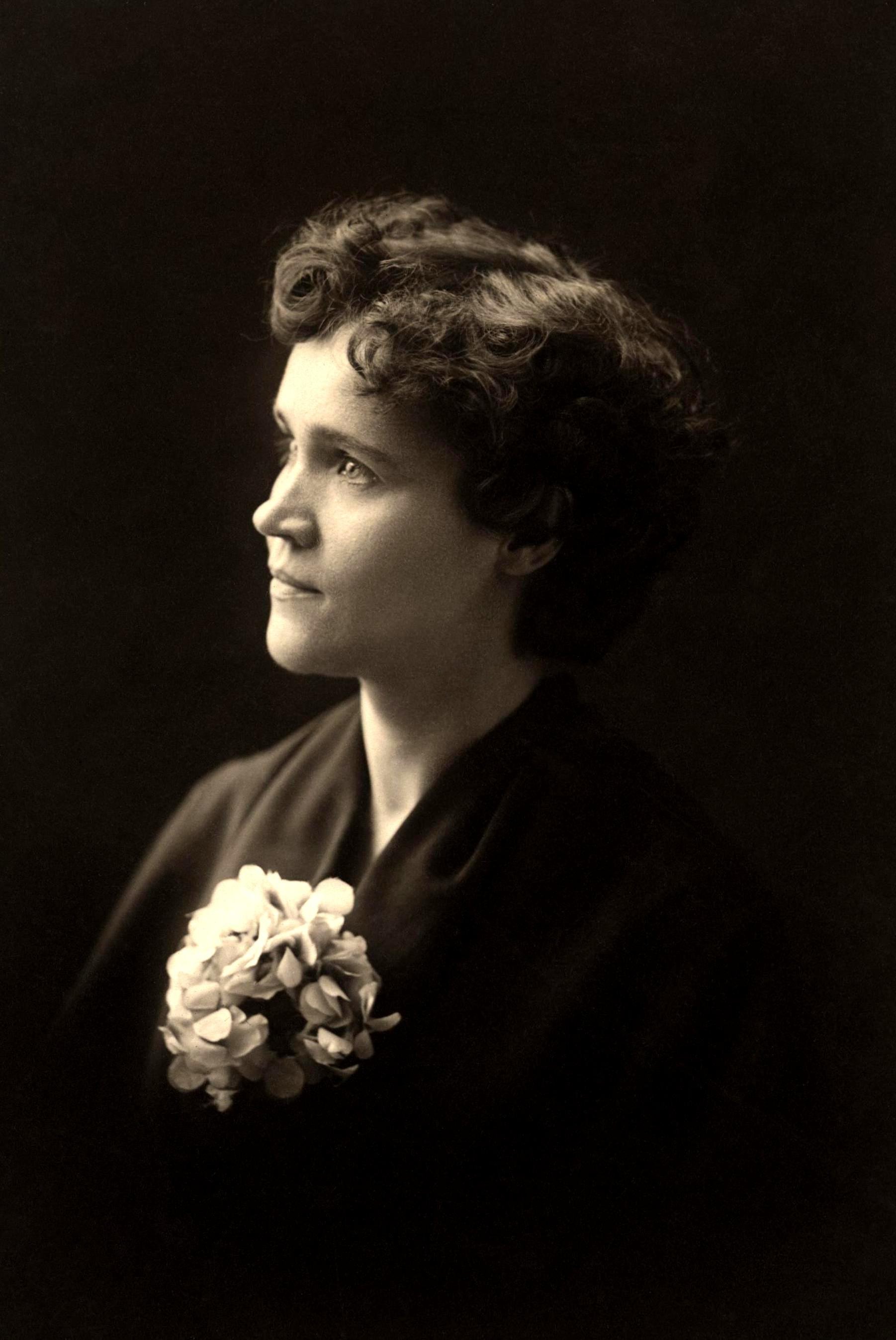
Voltairine de Cleyre, Harriet's youngest daughter

After Voltairine graduated from the convent and began publishing her poetry, she started signing her name as "Voltairine de Cleyre". She wrote regularly to her mother about various topics, including her friends, her travels, her political thoughts and activism, and even advice on hair products. When Voltairine began advocating for "new and strange ideas", she initially hid from Harriet, but opened up to her about in December 1887, as she thought that she "ought to know." She elaborated to Harriet of that she now rejected all religious, social and political authority, which was disturbing to Harriet, a socially conservative Presbyterian. Following a speech by Clarence Darrow that she had witnessed that same month, Voltairine wrote to her mother about her hatred of the "coal-kings" and "salt-owners", due to their creation of monopolies and their exploitation of labor. Voltairine admitted to her mother that "it is so strange to me that you are so afraid of anarchy and socialism"; although she considered herself neither an anarchist or socialist, she saw both as lesser evils to monopoly capitalists.

After becoming a mother herself, Voltairine wrote to Harriet of her depression, and complained to her about how her son Harry wouldn't apply himself to his studies, at her own expense. In 1891, Voltairine began to write to Harriet about the poverty of Jewish immigrants who she taught English in Philadelphia: "I will send you some of their compositions to read sometimes. There are times when I can’t speak for keeping back the tears when I am correcting them; they are mostly so pathetic—always on one subject—the misery of the poor." She herself began to experience greater poverty during this time, writing to Harriet that she hadn't bought a dress in three years and that malnutrition was exacerbating her chronic condition. Due to her financial situation, in 1893, she wrote to Harriet that she was considering marrying a man named Bentley, purely as a "business transaction". Still she also wrote to Harriet of how the Jewish children bought her Christmas presents, in spite of their own poverty. In response to the time she spent with them, she expressed to Harriet her desire to learn the Russian and Hebrew languages.

When she met Johann Most in May 1894, she wrote to Harriet about his oratory abilities, which she found impressive even though she didn't sympathise with his communist politics. When Illinois governor John Peter Altgeld posthumously pardoned the Haymarket martyrs, she sung his praises to Harriet, calling him a "brave man" who had sacrificed his political career "to save the poor workingmen". In 1897, she reported to Harriet that her life had made her "in a sterner mold than the original tendencies of childhood may have seemed to you to indicate", declaring: "I have my own principles, and should despise myself as a caitiff wretch did I not live in accordance with them."

When she travelled to England, she wrote to Harriet of her discomfort on the boat, with its "terrible food", "awful beds" and "disagreeable chattering lot of company." From London, she reported to Harriet of the sights she had visited, including the tomb of Lord Byron, telling her that "I have seen your beloved Byron's own handwriting in a page of Childe Harold I think." She was particularly impressed by Stonehenge and its surrounding area, which she had always wanted to visit, telling Harriet that "you would not have thought there was so lonely a place in England." In contrast, she wrote of London as an "abominably dirty place", where the air pollution made the temperature hotter, while also noting that "the streets are kept cleaner than the American city streets on the whole." During her time in London, she also met refugees that had fled Spain and reported to Harriet in graphic detail of the marks of torture she had seen on their bodies. She wrote to Harriet that she was particularly impressed by Fernando Tarrida del Mármol, who became a key influence on her own anarchist theories. She then left London for Scotland, which she fell deeply in love with, telling her mother: "O Scotland, bonnie, bonnie Scotland! I never loved a place so much as Scotland." She sent Harriet a copy of The Trossachs and Loch Lomond; she also wrote to her of her sadness that the "once beautiful valley" of Dundee had been "disfigured by vomiting chimneys" and reported of the child labor in the city's workhouses.

In the wake of the assassination of William McKinley, Voltairine reported to Harriet that she had become a target of a moral panic due to her anarchist affiliations, but believed the fervor would subside and personally expressed her regret that McKinley had died. But in a letter she sent to Harriet the following week, she expressed concern that the anti-anarchist rhetoric was turning violent; she began to wish that she would be deported and left to "live in peace far from anything that would ever remind me of America." The following month, she expressed worry to Harriet that the affair was causing a rise in "reactionary sentiments", while also pointing out that such assassination attempts were an occupational hazard inherent to the position of head of state. She also expressed sympathy for the assassin Leon Czolgosz, telling Harriet that she hoped he would soon be at peace, wondering how unhappy he must have been to commit such an act.

To Harriet, Voltairine also expressed her distaste for the institutions of marriage, saying that to her: "any dependence, any thing which destroys the complete selfhood of the individual, is in the line of slavery and destroys the pure spontaneity of love." She also expressed her skepticism of science to Harriet, saying that while it had done so much to advance knowledge, "we know no more than did the ancient Greek", and speculated of how in the future, present knowledge would be seen as "foolish" and "mythical".

=== Later life and death ===
By 1898, Voltairine was overworked and her illness was worsening. When Harriet finally visited Voltairine in Philadelphia in 1899, she expressed a dislike for her daughter's anarchist friends such as Mary Hansen, and was disgusted by her cockroach-infested house. In a letter to Adelaide, she complained that Voltairine gave all her money away to other people, while neglecting herself, not even spending money on a decent dress. While Voltairine was away on a lecture tour, Harriet took the opportunity to clean her apartment and expressed her distaste for her daughters lack of housekeeping, remarking that she had "only one knife, and that without a handle". Voltairine attempted to seek respite from her stressful worklife in Atlantic City, but told Harriet that she had ended up hating the place. Increasingly seeking solitude, she told her mother that "I think of myself in heaven when I have a long fair day ahead of me and nobody to talk to me for ten hours solid." She was able to find peace in the interludes between her busy schedule, occasionally visiting Harriet and Adelaide in St. Johns.

By the following year, Voltairine's financial situation had improved as she made more money from teaching, some of which she sent to Harriet. Over the years, Voltairine's income eventually grew to $13.50 per week, part of which she sent to her mother. Harriet complained that the amount she was sending her, which amounted to $1,000 in total, was "impractical". Although Voltairine's teaching work earned her a steady income, she confided to Harriet that it also physically exhausted her and left her without any free time, which was making her consider alternative career options. But alternatives to teaching were difficult to find, as she found objections to each possible option when discussing it with Harriet. She told her that she "wouldn't mind my work, if only I wasn't obliged to be always at it to keep it together. She attempted to pursue a career in writing, but was unsuccessful, explaining to her mother that it was "partly because I haven't cheek and persistence enough, and mostly because I've always had to do other things."

During the 1900s, Voltairine's health began to sharply decline and she was hospitalised. For a period, Harriet moved to Philadelphia to care for her daughter, who was in constant pain. When she left again for St. Johns, she left Voltairine in the care of her student Nathan Navro. She wrote to her mother that Navro "remains pure gold—in trouble or in joy always the same". When Hector De Claire died in 1906, Voltairine said to her mother that "he hadn't much out of his life either, had he?" By 1908, Voltairine was complaining to her mother of constant headaches and inflammation. As Voltairine's physical health declined, so too did her mental health. In February 1909, she wrote to Harriet that it was pointless for her to seek happiness, as her view of the world had become completely alienated from any thought of joy.

As her health continued to decline, in the autumn of that year, Voltairine herself decided to stay with her mother in St. Johns, although she clarified that Harriet "should not expect much help around the house". Harriet's own health had improved over the previous years, with Voltairine speculating that "her one disease is lonesomeness, outside of old age" and worried that Harriet would become "miserable" after she left again. In April 1912, an infection again hospitalised Voltairine, who wrote to Harriet that the back of her nose had completely decayed. After Voltairine died in June 1912, Harriet travelled from St. Johns to Chicago, together with Adelaide, to attend her funeral. Her friend Annie Livshis, who had nursed Voltairine in her final moments, sent Harriet her fur cap. Harriet responded: "it was what she wore the last sight I had of her living face. The dearest daughter that ever a woman had. I shall love you always because you were good to her."

Following Voltairine's death, Harriet began signing her own name "Harriet de Cleyre", in honor of her daughter. Her correspondence with Voltairine was also collected by the Ishill Collection at Harvard University and the Labadie Collection at the University of Michigan. Harriet De Claire died in her home in St. Johns, in 1927, at the age of ninety.

== Bibliography ==
- Avrich, Paul (1978). An American Anarchist: The Life of Voltairine de Cleyre. Princeton: Princeton University Press. ISBN 978-0-691-04657-0.
- Baillargeon, Normand; Santerre, Chantal, eds. (2018). "Présentation. La bannière de la révolte, l'étendard de la liberté: la vie et l'œuvre de Voltairine de Cleyre". Écrits d'une insoumise (in French). Lux Éditeur. ISBN 978-2-89596-923-5.
- Campbell, Michelle M. (2013). "Voltairine de Cleyre and the Anarchist Canon". Anarchist Developments in Cultural Studies. 1: 64–81. ISSN 1923-5615.
- DeLamotte, Eugenia (2004). Gates of Freedom: Voltairine de Cleyre and the Revolution of the Mind. University of Michigan Press. doi:10.3998/mpub.11482. ISBN 0-472-09867-5. JSTOR 10.3998/mpub.11482. LCCN 2004006183.
- Marsh, Margaret S. (1978). "The Anarchist-Feminist Response to the "Woman Question" in Late Nineteenth-Century America". American Quarterly. 30 (4): 533–547. doi:10.2307/2712299. JSTOR 2712299.
- McKinley, Blaine (1982). ""The Quagmires of Necessity": American Anarchists and Dilemmas of Vocation". American Quarterly. 34 (5): 503–523. doi:10.2307/2712642. JSTOR 2712642.
