= James B. Elliott =

American freethinker (1849–1931)

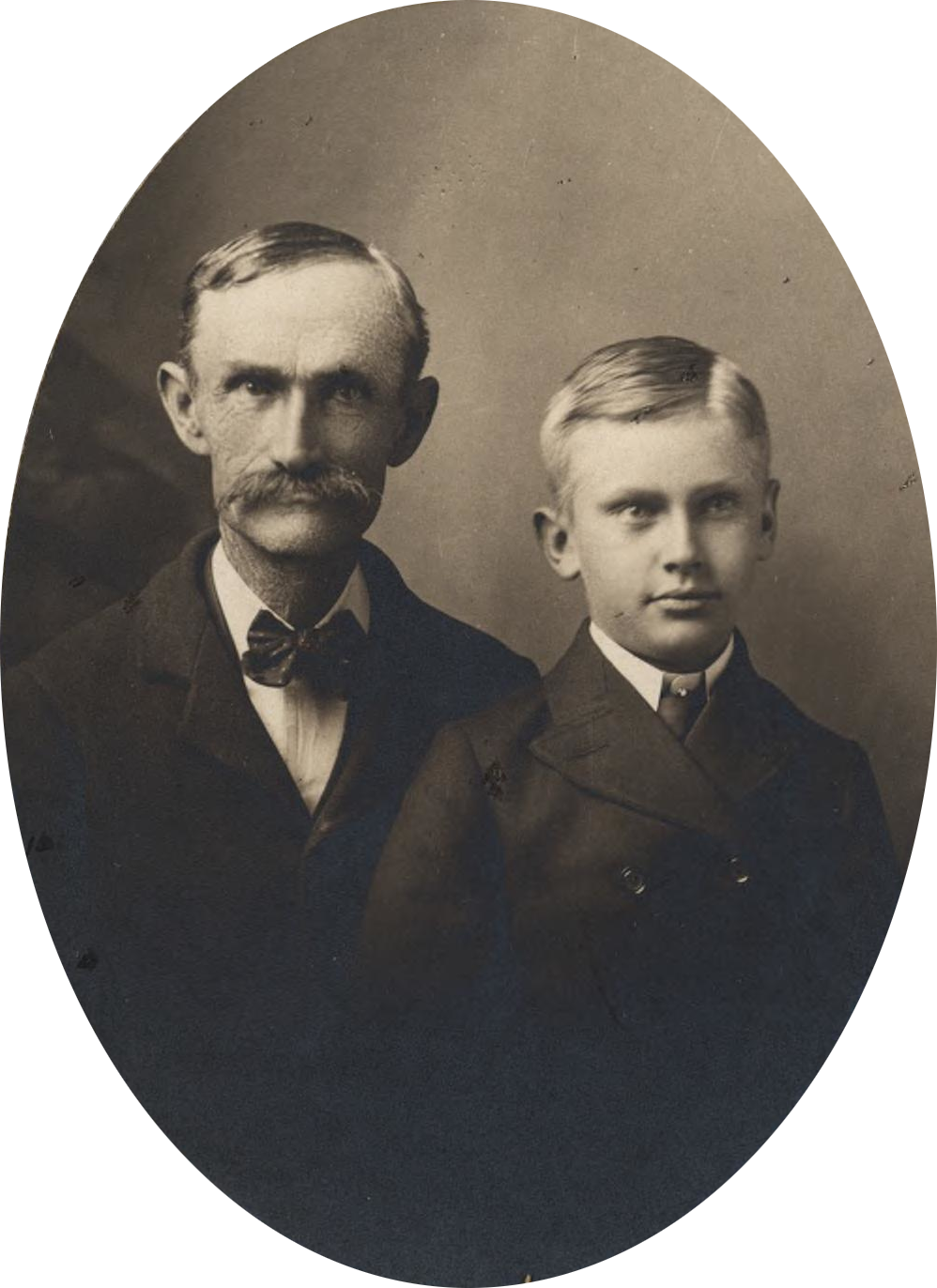
- Elliott (left) and his son Harry (right)
- Born: 1849; Philadelphia, Pennsylvania, United States
- Died: May 28, 1931 (aged 81–82); Pennsylvania, United States
- Resting place: Arlington Cemetery
- Occupation: Carpenter
- Movement: Freethought
- Partner: Voltairine de Cleyre
- Children: Harry

James B. Elliott (1849–1931) was an American freethinker. Through his involvement with a number of freethinking organizations and publications, he met the anarchist Voltairine de Cleyre, with whom he had a brief romantic relationship and fathered a child, Harry. He spent the 1890s raising his son, working as a carpenter and collecting memorabilia of his idol Thomas Paine. By the turn of the 20th century, he succumbed to a mental disorder and became estranged from his family, leaving his son and losing contact with de Cleyre.

== Biography ==
James B. Elliott was born in 1849, in Philadelphia, where he was raised by his mother. He found work as a carpenter and later became a freethinker, giving lectures on rationalism at the Philadelphia Ethical Society and Friendship Liberal League, and writing articles for The Truth Seeker. Through one freethought newspaper, The Progressive Age, Elliott encountered the writings of Voltairine de Cleyre, noting her expressive anger towards the Catholic Church.

In June 1888, he greeted de Cleyre at the Philadelphia train station, having invited her to give a speech at a meeting of the Friendship Liberal League. The following year, she settled in the city and moved into Elliott's rooming house. The two were quickly attracted to each other, although historian Margaret Marsh notes that Elliott was "intellectually inferior" to de Cleyre and had an "eccentric" character, which left her to wonder why de Cleyre found him so appealing. They struck up a brief romantic relationship, but as de Cleyre refused to marry Elliott, it quickly broke down and ended. They remained friends and continued to live in the same house, with Elliott caring for de Cleyre's plants and pets while she was on lecture tours.

On June 12, 1890, de Cleyre gave birth to their son Harry, but she felt emotionally and physically unable to raise him, so left him in Elliott's care. De Cleyre's sister Adelaide D. Thayer, herself childless, asked if she could take care of Harry, but Elliott refused. In 1894, de Cleyre moved out of the Elliott household, finding a new home with the couple Mary and George Brown. In 1896, Elliott visited de Cleyre's mother Harriet De Claire and built an extension for her house in St. Johns, Michigan. Around this time, Elliott was made secretary of both the Paine Memorial Association and the Paine Historical Association. Elliott idolised Thomas Paine, going on a pilgrimage to all of Paine's homes in both North America and England and collecting his memorabilia.

By the turn of the 20th century, Elliott had become increasingly mentally imbalanced and left his son at the age of ten to fend for himself. In 1900, he managed to find de Cleyre's estranged father Hector De Claire, and together they sent Harriet a number of messages that worried her. For this, de Cleyre called Elliott a "devil" and said he was "not right in his intellects", telling her sister Adelaide that he had "no self-respect whatever, but insists on intruding himself constantly everywhere."

In 1910, de Cleyre moved to Chicago and Elliott fell out of touch with her. After her death, her anarchist comrades claimed that Elliott had deliberately prevented de Cleyre from seeing their child, but Margaret Marsh notes that this depiction is inaccurate. Elliott himself died in 1931, at the age of 82. Elliott was posthumously denounced in anarchist newspapers for neglecting his son Harry and preventing de Cleyre from seeing her child; according to historian Margaret Marsh, this depiction was "not strictly true, but it preserved an unsullied image" of de Cleyre.

== Bibliography ==
- Avrich, Paul (1978). An American Anarchist: The Life of Voltairine de Cleyre. Princeton: Princeton University Press. ISBN 978-0-691-04657-0.
- DeLamotte, Eugenia (2004). Gates of Freedom: Voltairine de Cleyre and the Revolution of the Mind. University of Michigan Press. doi:10.3998/mpub.11482. ISBN 0-472-09867-5. JSTOR 10.3998/mpub.11482. LCCN 2004006183.
- Marsh, Margaret S. (1981). "No Illusions: The Anarchist Life of Voltairine de Cleyre". Anarchist Women, 1870–1920. Philadelphia: Temple University Press. pp. 123–150. ISBN 978-0-87722-202-6.
- Sartwell, Crispin (2005). "Priestess of Pity and Vengeance". In Sharon, Presley; Sartwell, Crispin (eds.). Exquisite Rebel: The Essays of Voltairine De Cleyre – Anarchist, Feminist, Genius. Albany: State University of New York Press. pp. 3–16. ISBN 978-0-7914-6094-8.
- Shone, Steve J. (2013). "Voltairine de Cleyre: More of an Anarchist than a Feminist?". American Anarchism. Leiden: Brill. pp. 38–59. doi:10.1163/9789004251953_004. ISBN 9789004251953.
