= Nathan Navro =

Russian-American anarchist (1876–1947)

- נתן נאַווראָ
- Born: August 1, 1876; Russian Empire
- Died: October 23, 1947 (aged 71); Pennsylvania, United States
- Resting place: Springfield Township, Delaware County, Pennsylvania
- Occupations: Cigar maker, musician, caregiver
- Movement: Anarchism

Nathan Navro (August 1, 1876 – October 23, 1947) was a Russian American anarchist, musician and caregiver. Navro immigrated to the United States in the 1890s, settling in Philadelphia, where he was educated in the English language by Voltairine de Cleyre. He soon became proficient enough in the language that he wrote English poems for Free Society and, influenced by his teacher, became a musician. He later became de Cleyre's primary caregiver, nursing her through years of ill health. He was a close friend of hers until her death and his manuscript about her has become a key primary source on her life.

== Biography ==
Nathan Navro was born in 1876, into a Jewish family in the Russian Empire. By the 1890s, he had immigrated to the United States and settled in the city of Philadelphia.

=== As de Cleyre's student ===
While working as a cigar maker, in 1896, Navro approached the anarchist Voltairine de Cleyre for tutoring in the English language. Navro was among hundreds of Jewish students that de Cleyre tutored in Philadelphia. She once told him that Jewish people were "the most liberal minded and active comrades in the movement, as well as the most transcendental dreamers." Under her tutelage, his grip on the language improved rapidly, resulting in him being able to contribute poems to the American anarchist newspaper Free Society. Within a few years, he had quite his job at the cigar factory to study music.

In letters to Joseph Ishill, de Cleyre's sister Adelaide D. Thayer described him as "a fine man and a good friend"; her son Harry de Cleyre depicted him as a man of "unquestioned integrity", remarking that he was "free of petty jealousies", unlike a number of de Cleyre's other students. He was also well liked by her mother Harriet De Claire, who disliked most of her daughter's other friends. Voltairine de Cleyre herself called him "the best character I have ever known in all this world".

He soon joined his teacher in anarchist activism, remarking that she had "practically created the protest movement in Philadelphia." He joined her reading group, the Social Science Club, which met each Sunday and discussed the works of different anarchist thinkers. By 1901, it had become Philadelphia's foremost anarchist group. To Navro, de Cleyre's commitment to anarchism remained as solid as "a rock", even as many other Philadelphia anarchists dropped out of the movement. According to Navro "every word" of de Cleyre's lectures and speeches were "calculated to express the strongest possible idea."

=== As de Cleyre's carer ===
Despite her constant work, de Cleyre's tutoring only earned her a meager wage, which, according to Navro, meant that she often went without food. Navro wrote that her poor diet and overwork had caused her chronic condition "to make terrible inroads on her constitution", ultimately shortening her life. In December 1902, de Cleyre was shot by a disgruntled former pupil, Herman Helcher. Navro reported that Helcher had been obsessed with de Cleyre and her partner Samuel H. Gordon, and had tried to get them back together "for the good of the cause". Navro initially thought him "a little foolish, but very sincere in his anarchism", but after de Cleyre's split with Gordon, he had begun exhibiting "abnormal behavior". According to Navro, after the assassination attempt, medical examiners concluded that Helcher had suffered from an accumulation of uric acid in his system, which had caused him "paraonia" and "insanity".

The assassination exacerbated her already precarious physical condition. By 1904, Navro reported that de Cleyre's health had seen a "terrible decline", as her chronic catarrh which she had had since childhood spread from her sinuses to the rest of her head, briefly causing her to go deaf. After regaining her senses, de Cleyre told Navro that her ear infection had caused a pounding sensation that was "louder than the noise of the locomotives stationed within a few yards from her house". According to Navro, de Cleyre spent the rest of her life in "continuous torture". Navro, who lived together with her, gave her bedside care and attempted to nurse de Cleyre back to health. One night, she attempted to commit suicide with a morphine overdose, but according to Navro, it "failed to bring the desired result". He continued to care for her as she gradually recovered, although she would live in pain for the rest of her life, which he said to have "cast a gloom over her spirit".

Under Navro's care, by 1906, de Cleyre had regained her strength and was able to return to her anarchist organizing work. That year, she was visited by Alexander Berkman, whose acquaintance Navro remarked was a "memorable and vivid" moment for her. When de Cleyre was arrested and tried for incitement in June 1908, Navro claimed that the Philadelphia Police Department had bribed witnesses to present false testimony against the defendants, while de Cleyre herself had been unable to any "quiet-looking, respectable-appearing" people to defend her. Navro remained friends with de Cleyre until she died. When her health finally collapsed in the spring of 1912, Navro and Harry de Cleyre travelled from Philadelphia to Chicago, to be at her bedside as she died. His manuscript of his recollections about de Cleyre was collected by Joseph Ishill, whose papers are preserved in Harvard University's Houghton Library.

Navro died on 23 October 1947. His body was buried in the Mount Sharon Cemetery in Springfield Township.

== Bibliography ==
- Avrich, Paul (1978). An American Anarchist: The Life of Voltairine de Cleyre. Princeton: Princeton University Press. ISBN 978-0-691-04657-0.
- DeLamotte, Eugenia (2004). Gates of Freedom: Voltairine de Cleyre and the Revolution of the Mind. University of Michigan Press. doi:10.3998/mpub.11482. ISBN 0-472-09867-5. JSTOR 10.3998/mpub.11482. LCCN 2004006183.
