= Agnes Inglis =

American librarian and anarchist activist (1870–1952)

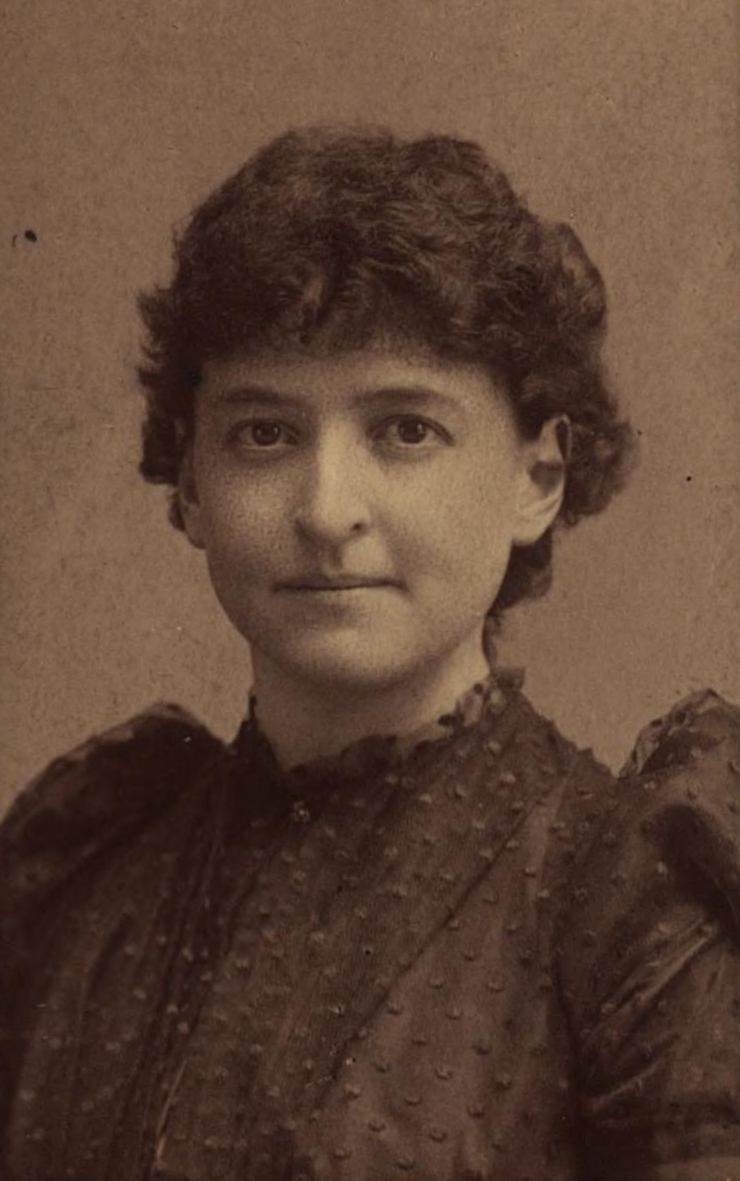
- Inglis in 1891

Curator of the Labadie Collection
- In role 1924–1952
- Preceded by: Jo Labadie
- Succeeded by: Edward Weber

Personal details
- Born: Agnes Ann Inglis; 1870 Detroit, Michigan, United States
- Died: January 30, 1952 (aged 81) Michigan, United States
- Education: University of Michigan
- Occupation: Librarian, archivist
- Movement: Anarchism in the United States

Agnes Ann Inglis (1870 – January 30, 1952) was an American librarian and anarchist activist. Born into a wealthy family, she was radicalized by her work as a social worker and was inspired by the works of Emma Goldman to join the American anarchist movement. She used her inheritance to support the movement, paying into strike funds and for the bail of arrested activists. Following the First Red Scare, she began working at the Labadie Collection at the University of Michigan Library. She soon became the head curator of the collection, developing a system of organization that contextualized items by their subject. She devoted the rest of her life to the collection, expanding, organizing and providing public access to it.

== Early life ==
Agnes Ann Inglis was born into a wealthy family in Detroit, in 1870. She was the youngest child of Richard Inglis, a local physician, and Agnes Lambie Inglis. Her father died in 1874, when Inglis was only four years old. Inglis was raised Presbyterian, in a strict religious conservative household. She was traumatized by her religious upbringing, having been brought up to believe that she was "born in sin" and to be ashamed of her own body. She was known to be a shy, introverted child.

Inglis attended Sunday school, received her primary education at Clay grammar school and then went on to the Capitol High School. She also spent a single year in higher education at the Abbot Academy in Massachusetts, but was forced to return home to care for her family. She spent much of her early adulthood caring for her ailing mother and siblings; one of her sisters contracted cancer. Her sister died in 1898, followed by her mother soon after.

With nothing left to keep her at home, as Inglis was turning 30, she left to study history and literature at the University of Michigan. There she joined the Alpha Phi sorority and spent a year studying the Middle Ages. She never graduated from university, dropping out after a year to instead travel around as an itinerant social worker. She worked first at the Franklin Street Settlement House in Detroit, then at Hull House in Chicago. She was radicalized by the poverty and harsh working conditions she observed foreign workers enduring, which made her question liberal charitable programs and the wider social order in the United States.

Inglis then moved to Ann Arbor, Michigan, where she volunteered to work at the YWCA and as a Sunday school teacher. At her home on Wilmot Street, she hosted other social workers, family and students. Her work at the YWCA led her to investigate how poor women were driven towards sex work, and how the spread of sexually transmitted infections affected them. In 1911, she gave a report on her investigation to the Ladies Union, causing an outrage. The YMCA and several women's organizations subsequently formed the Social Purity Club to promote the introduction of sexual and reproductive health classes in schools. She also encountered opposition from religious conservatives, which made her increasingly antireligious, although her investigations eventually led to the establishment of the Michigan Social Hygiene Commission.

When the Michigan Legislature began considering a new minimum wage law for women in the workforce, Inglis took a job as a state inspector and went to factories and retail outlets to investigate women's working conditions. During this time, she grew more self-conscious about her unearned income, much of which had been extracted as rent from poor workers. Inglis began an informal education, during which time she read many works and attended several lectures by radicals and revolutionaries. She soon came to believe that socialism provided an answer to societal problems.

== Anarchist activism ==
By the outbreak of the 1912 Lawrence textile strike, Inglis had joined the Industrial Workers of the World (IWW). She mobilized support for organized labor and the early civil rights movement, using her inheritance to support strike funds and pay the bail of arrested activists. She also held union meetings at her home and attempted to incite strike actions, including one at a ball bearing factory in Ann Arbor.

In March 1912, Inglis came across the pamphlet "What I Believe", written by the anarchist activist Emma Goldman. She was inspired by Goldman's vision of a society without poverty, hatred or disease, leading her to join the American anarchist movement. She met Goldman at a lecture later that year, where she was impressed by her ability to withstand hecklers whenever she brought up free love. In the summer of 1913, Inglis invited Goldman to dinner, where she offered to act as her representative and financial backer in Ann Arbor. She soon began organizing lectures for Goldman to speak on various subjects. Goldman's extroverted character also helped Inglis to become more confindant and assertive herself. But over time, Inglis grew to resent Goldman, feeling her money and labor were being exploited by her. Goldman later paid tribute to Inglis in her autobiography Living My Life (1931).

Anarchist activist Jo Labadie (1890)

Inglis organized a series of anarchist lectures throughout southeast Michigan, and spoke alongside Rudolf Rocker at cultural events organised by the Detroit Modern School. A lecture by the socialist feminist Rose Pastor left a deep impression on Inglis, who reported that Pastor had "won the hearts" of the whole audience. Inglis became a committed social activist, organizing rallies in support of higher wages and better working conditions for women in the workforce, and advocating for sex workers' rights. She passed out information about birth control, risking arrest, as it was illegal at the time. In 1913, she left Presbyterianism and became an atheist. By 1915, she had met and become friends with Goldman's lover Alexander Berkman. Together with Berkman, she organized a protest against the arrest of Thomas Mooney over his alleged role in the Preparedness Day bombing. In 1916, she met and befriended the anarchist activist Jo Labadie and his wife Sophie, the latter of whom Inglis attempted to recruit for a women's strike.

Following the American entry into World War I, Inglis joined the anti-war movement in protest against the introduction of conscription. Throughout the First Red Scare, Inglis paid the bail and organised legal defense funds for many draft evaders. Her wealth made her invaluable to the organized labor movement, using her houses as collateral to bail out IWW activists, while she herself rented a room elsewhere. She quipped that, if she ever stopped funding the revolutionary movement, she would likely be denounced as a counterrevolutionary.

Inglis raised money for the legal defense of prominent anarchist figures such as Sacco and Vanzetti, Bill Haywood and Emma Goldman; the latter of which received the backing of Elizabeth Gurley Flynn. In 1918, when Goldman was imprisoned for anti-war activism, Inglis visited her in her cell in Jefferson City, Missouri; Goldman was deported the following year. Although she rarely spent money on herself, her constant expenditure on the movement eventually drained her savings. Her family responded by restricting her to an allowance, so she would spend less of her money supporting radical politics. Inglis felt relieved to no longer be seen as a rich woman that could always be relied on for funding. By the turn of the 1920s, she had retired from revolutionary activism and turned towards research. She returned to the University of Michigan, where she hoped to learn more about the eight-hour day movement.

== Library curation ==
In the early 1920s, Inglis began visiting the Labadie Collection at the University of Michigan Library, where she initially worked on her own research, before turning her attention to organizing the collection. The Labadies had collected an enormous quantity of radical literature at their home before donating it to the library, where most of it remained unorganized and uncataloged until Inglis began working on it. By 1924, Inglis was voluntarily working as a curator for the collection. She felt a sense of personal responsibility for organizing the archived material, writing to Labadie and Goldman of the scale of the work she had to do in the first months. She set her own hours and did not ask for payment. She quickly became immersed in the collection, spending whole days in the library and many nights working on it at home. She found the experience exhilarating, but it also left her melancholic to spend so much of her time focused on the past.

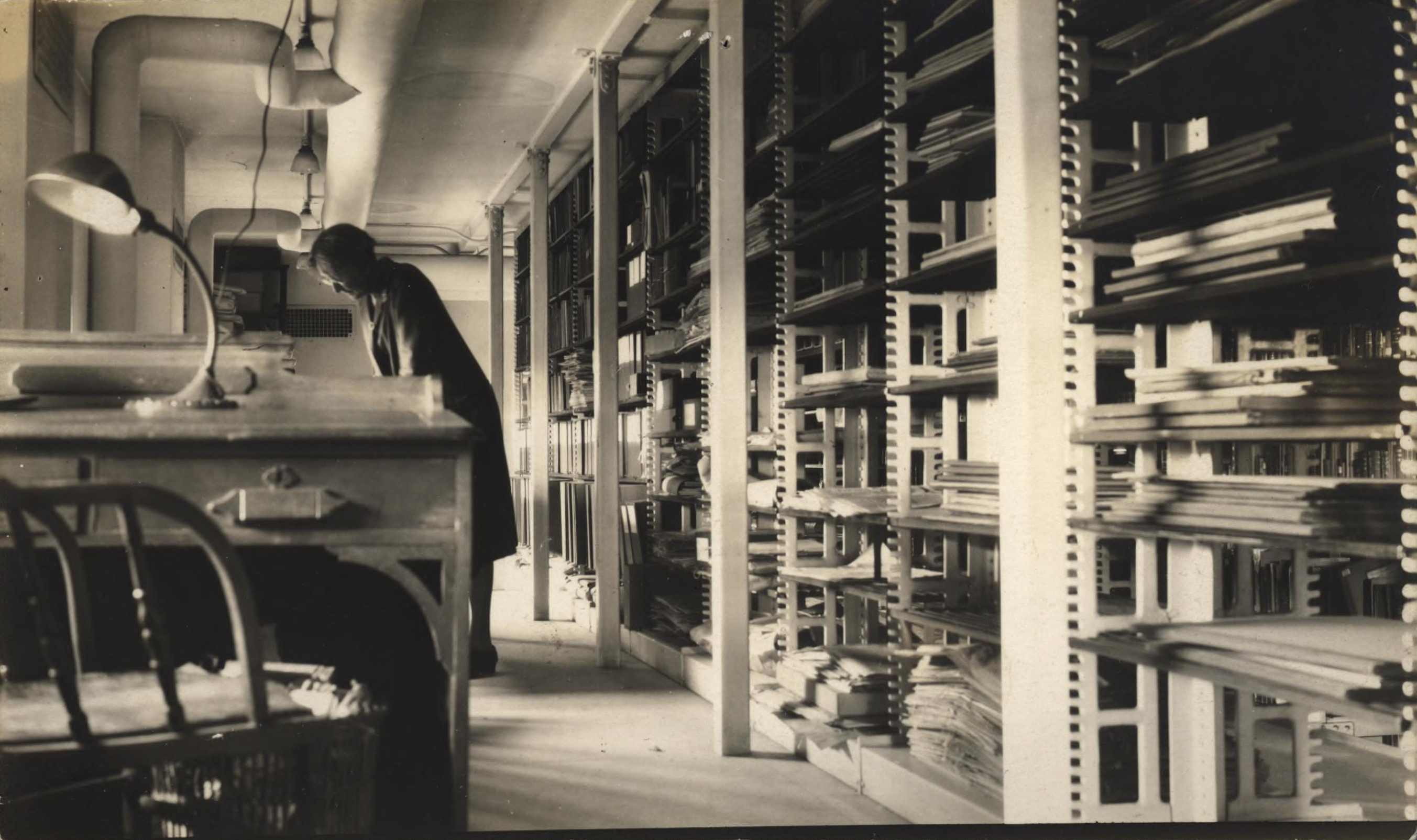
Inglis at work in the Labadie Collection (1929)

The university administration did not support her work, but it did not interfere with it either. Inglis received no supervision or assistance from trained librarians, which gave her substantial operational freedom in how she organized the archive. She believed that the relative obscurity of the collection would protect it from being discovered and destroyed by the authorities. Without any training, she developed her own idiosyncratic method of organizing the collection by dividing it into subjects and cataloging it by item. None of the items were alphabetized or indexed, so she relied on her memory to locate material. She wrote extensive notes to contextualize the collection, providing anecdotal information about historical context and individual biographies, and attaching them as slips to manuscripts. She also bound paperback publications and compiled newspaper clippings into scrapbooks. Without any operating budget, she gathered furniture and stationery from other parts of the library and promoted the collection through word of mouth. Inglis prioritised public access of the collection, freely allowing materials to be lent out. She responded kindly to borrowers, even when they returned books in a damaged state. Some did not return the items at all.

Inglis' work as a librarian was directly motivated by her anarchist philosophy and left-wing politics. She initially viewed her work as a curator as playing only a supporting role in the anarchist movement, but later came to see it as a form of direct participation. She used her knowledge of the movement and connections within activist circles to acquire and sort materials for the collection. After noticing there were gaps in the archived materials, with incomplete sets of periodicals and other publications, she sought to expand on Labadie's initial collection. She began reaching out to people she knew from her activist network, some of whom were previously sceptical of academic institutions, and established a collection development program to acquire more material. She published notices requesting contributions in prominent left-wing periodicals, and used her own money to subscribe to more obscure publications. She even tracked down activists who had dropped out of the movement and the families of those who had died, expressing a keen interest in their personal lives.

Without any budget for acquisitions, she relied entirely on donations. Over the years, she reached out to hundreds of radicals requesting they contribute new materials, which resulted in a massive expansion of the collection's holdings. Her own donations amounted to 500 issues of various periodicals and a large collection of materials from the Spanish Civil War. Through her efforts, the collection received contributions from Louis Adamic, Roger Nash Baldwin, Ralph Chaplin, Joseph Desser, Millie Grobstein, Emma Goldman, Elizabeth Gurley Flynn, Hippolyte Havel, Ammon Hennacy, Granville Hicks, Joseph Ishill, Mark Mratchny, Ben Reitman, Hugo Rolland, Alfred Sanftleben, and Augustin Souchy. Jo Labadie and his friends also perenially contributed boxes full of material to the collection. Inglis notably collected the papers of the American anarchist Voltairine de Cleyre.

As the archive's main contributor after Labadie, Inglis quickly became indispensable to the functioning of the collection. Labadie himself recommended they change the name to the "Inglis-Labadie Collection", but Inglis declined any official recognition for her work. In 1928, Inglis was officially recognised as the curator of the Labadie Collection. Five years into her work as a librarian, in 1929, the head librarian William Warner Bishop finally gave her a salary. However, the university only paid her a small amount for a brief period of time. She received help from Carl Nold, a friend of the anarchist activist Lucy Parsons. She also briefly received help from Margaret Grenell, who worked as her assistant and created a series of scrapbooks about the Knights of Labor and the Haymarket affair. Through her research, Inglis came to believe that an American member of the Knights of Labor had introduced a resolution to establish 1 May as International Workers' Day at the Possibilist Workers Congress of Paris in 1889. After corresponding with one delegate, William S. Waudby, who claimed that he had been the one to introduce the resolution, Inglis accepted his explanation, which was soon taken as fact by American left-wing historiography. However, no evidence of such a resolution can be found in the proceedings of the Congress or in Waudby's own notes of it, and Waudby never claimed to have authored it until contacted by Inglis; historian Sidney Fine concluded that Inglis had contributed to the creation of a historical myth.

In collaboration with Bishop and the associate librarian Francis Goodrich, by 1930, Inglis was overseeing the binding of newspapers and the making of bookplates for books and pamphlets. In 1933, Labadie died, leaving Inglis to continue his work with the collection. She continued corresponding with his son Laurance Labadie, who ran the Labadie printing press. Inglis would go on to devote the rest of her life to curating the collection. By the mid-1930s, Inglis was receiving credit in several books for her assistance in research, bringing the Labadie Collection to national prominence. She took a particularly close interest in the trial of Sacco and Vanzetti, the imprisonment of Tom Mooney, and the place of the anarchist movement in the Spanish Civil War. In 1938, she tracked down information about the later life of the English Chartist John Francis Bray, finding his family in Pontiac, Michigan, where she acquired a trunk full of his writings for the collection; the Bray family also gave her the papers of the German revolutionary Karl Heinzen. She later made contact with Benjamin Tucker's family in France, who also supplied her with material. Inglis provided research materials for the autobiographies of Goldman and Chapman, and history books by Paul Avrich and James J. Martin. Her correspondence from the late 1940s, including with Ba Jin and Cassius Cook, were used as primary sources in Carolyn Ashbaugh's 1976 biography on Lucy Parsons. She also supplied documents for a book Ba Jin was writing about the Haymarket affair. Avrich credited Inglis and Labadie with having preserved much of the historical record of American anarchism. He dedicated his book The Modern School Movement to Inglis' memory. Historian Patrick Renshaw credited Inglis with having established "one of the finest collections of anarchist papers in the United States". Historian James O. Morris gave Inglis, who he described as "one of the gentlest, kindest persons" he knew, one of only two copies of a manuscript he had written about Joe Hill.

She continued working on the collection into her old age. By 1950, Inglis had reversed her policy on allowing loans, no longer allowing materials to be lent out due to their rarity and fragility. In her later years, she became increasingly exhausted keeping the collection open to visitors. Her work slowed down, limiting herself to supplying material and information, while leaving visitors mostly alone. Inglis never married, but she maintained many close friendships, and later in life she had a brief romantic relationship with a Polish singer. She died on January 30, 1952, at the age of 81.

== Legacy ==
Over the course of nearly thirty years working on the Labadie Collection, Inglis had expanded its holdings by about twenty times over, much of it contributed by either herself or her contacts. After she died, Warner Rice, the head librarian at the University, did not fill her post despite having promised he would do so. Inglis herself had not trained anyone to take up the work of maintaining the archive. Only she had understood her unique cataloging system and she had left no guide or index for researchers. The collection was opened up to unsupervised patrons and no further cataloging was done, resulting in the deterioration of her filing system over the course of the 1950s. Hugo Rolland said that he continued to contribute materials to the Labadie Collection after Inglis' death, but that the new head of the library destroyed some of it due to his conservative politics. The librarian Alfred Harris expressed frustration with Inglis' "individualist anarchist methods" of cataloging and attempted to reorganize some sections of the collection, which resulted in delays in the supplying of information. The rearranging of the collection resulted in further confusion, with the archive falling into neglect and many materials losing their place on the shelves.

When the Labadie Collection was relocated to the Hatcher Library, Inglis' filing system was finally replaced, although her indexing cards and extensive notes were retained. Attempts to put her notes back in their original place, having all been collected into a single box, were frustrated by the reorganization, with certain aspects of the notes no longer making sense. Her notes continued to be some of the collection's most-used materials, well into the 21st century. The collection was eventually taken over by Edward Weber, who curated it from 1960 to 2000 and expanded its holdings to include publications from the gay liberation, environmentalist and feminist movements; at the insistence of the library director, Weber also added material from the far-right to the collection. Weber followed Inglis' example and corresponded directly with individuals and organizations, soliciting further donations to the collection. He described her as a "pioneer" in the archiving of radical material, at a time when "official institutions, among them libraries, frowned on the idea".

In 1997, Ellen Doree Rosen, the daughter of an IWW member whose bail Inglis had paid in 1917, donated her father's documents to the collection, where they became key primary sources for students of the labor movement. In 2012, the Labadie Collection, along with Inglis' index cards and notes, were transcribed and digitised into a publicly-accessible online database. By 2017, the collection was the fastest-growing and most used library in the University of Michigan; curator Julie Herrada credited Inglis for the collection continuing to thrive. Historian Carlotta Anderson also credited Inglis as the main person responsible for making the Labadie Collection into "the most comprehensive collection of radical literature in the United States".

== Bibliography ==
- Anderson, Carlotta (2017). "A Pack Rat's Hoard". All-American Anarchist: Joseph A. Labadie and the Labor Movement. Wayne State University Press. pp. 227–235. doi:10.1353/book.56563. ISBN 9780814343272.
- Ashbaugh, Carolyn (1976). Lucy Parsons, American revolutionary. Chicago: Kerr. ISBN 0-88286-005-4.
- Avrich, Paul (1980). The Modern School Movement: Anarchism and Education in the United States. Princeton University Press. ISBN 0-691-04669-7.
- Avrich, Paul (1995). Anarchist Voices: An Oral History of Anarchism In America. Princeton University Press. ISBN 978-0-691-03412-6.
- Carr, H. J. (1940). "John Francis Bray". Economica. 7 (28): 397–415. doi:10.2307/2550233. JSTOR 2550233.
- Ferguson, Kathy E. (2024). "Anarchives: The Labadie Collection". PS – Political Science & Politics. 57 (1): 88–89. doi:10.1017/S1049096523000689. ISSN 1049-0965.
- Fine, Sidney (1954). "Is May Day American in Origin?". The Historian. 16 (2): 121–134. doi:10.1111/j.1540-6563.1954.tb00157.x.
- Herrada, Julie; Hyry, Tom (1999). "Agnes Inglis: Anarchist Librarian" (PDF). Progressive Librarian (Special Supplement to #16): 7–10. ISSN 1052-5726.
- Herrada, Julie (2000). "Continuing a legacy: collecting for a special collections library". Collection Building. 19 (4): 163–165. doi:10.1108/01604950010354840.
- Herrada, Julie (2007). "Collecting anarchy: Continuing the Legacy of the Joseph A. Labadie Collection". RBM: A Journal of Rare Books, Manuscripts, and Cultural Heritage. 8 (2): 133–140. doi:10.5860/rbm.8.2.287. ISSN 1529-6407.
- Herrada, Julie (2017). "Agnes Inglis (1870–1952) and the Birth of a Radical Archive". In Barndt, Kerstin; Sinopoli, Carla M. (eds.). Object Lessons and the Formation of Knowledge: The University of Michigan Museums, Libraries, and Collections 1817–2017. University of Michigan Press. pp. 150–155. ISBN 9780472130276.
- Hyry, Tom (August 1996). "Agnes Inglis Papers 1909-1952". University of Michigan Library.
- Mamoru, Yamaguchi (2023). "A Study of Ba Jin's correspondence with European and American anarchists". In Chang, Chen; Tianyi, Liu; Sihe, Chen (eds.). Routledge Companion to Ba Jin. Routledge. doi:10.4324/9781003432531. ISBN 9781003432531.
- Morris, James O. (1971). "Philip Foner and the writing of the Joe Hill case: An exchange". Labor History. 12 (1): 81–114. doi:10.1080/00236567108584152. ISSN 0023-656X.
- Pino, Angel (2014). "Ba Jin as Translator". In Peng, Hsiao-yen; Rabut, Isabelle (eds.). Modern China and the West: Translation and Cultural Mediation. Leiden: Brill. pp. 28–105. doi:10.1163/9789004270220_004. ISBN 978-90-04-27022-0.
- Pugh, Mary Jo (1974). "1900-1919". In Cocks, III, J. Fraser (ed.). Pictorial history of Ann Arbor, 1824-1974. Bentley Historical Library. pp. 53–72. OCLC 575823415.
- Renshaw, Patrick (1981). "Rose of the World: The Pastor-Stokes Marriage and the American Left, 1905–1925". New York History. 62 (4): 415–438. ISSN 0146-437X. JSTOR 23170033.
- Scanlan, Eleanor H. (1965). "The Labadie collection". Labor History. 6 (3): 244–248. doi:10.1080/00236566508583970. ISSN 0023-656X.
- Weber, Edward C. (1990). "The Labadie Collection in the University of Michigan Library". Labor History. 31 (1–2): 155–162. doi:10.1080/00236569000890251.
- Weber, Edward C. (2017). "The Labadie Collection Today". All-American Anarchist: Joseph A. Labadie and the Labor Movement. Wayne State University Press. pp. 255–258. doi:10.1353/book.56563. ISBN 9780814343272.
