= Cassius Cook =

American anarchist

Cassius V. Cook (1879– March 1, 1950) was an American anarchist activist, writer and publisher.

== Biography ==
Cook grew up in Iowa before moving to Chicago and then California. He studied pharmacy at the College of Physicians and Surgeons in San Francisco.

He was an associate of Emma Goldman, raising her bond when she was arrested in San Francisco in 1909 after she came to the city for a series of lectures and debates organized by the San Francisco Social Science League, of which Cook was a member. He later accompanied her to Seattle as part of a lecture tour. When the San Francisco Free Speech League was formed after Goldman's arrest, he became its secretary. The involvement of Cook and others in Goldman's defense was said to have "invigorated [Goldman] with a new sense of mission."

He contributed writing to Mother Earth and was arrested for opposition to the First World War.

He later settled in Vancouver, British Columbia where in 1913 he was secretary-treasurer of the Miners' Liberation League and worked for the Dr. Bell Electro Appliance Company from 1913 to 1916 according to city directories.

Later in the decade, he edited The Libertarian Magazine in Seattle.

In 1919, Cook was head of the Chicago office of the International Workers' Defence League and was involved in organizing to free or win a retrial for Thomas Mooney, who had been convicted and sentenced to death—commuted to life in prison—for the San Francisco Preparedness Day Bombing.

Between the World Wars, Cook was a member of the anarchist Libertarian Society in Los Angeles. He was described as a "large, florid, and bombastic" man, who "wrote resolutions for meetings and conventions."

Later in life, he was an advertising executive and secretary of Rocker Publications, which printed and promoted the work of Rudolf Rocker.

He was living in Los Angeles when he died on March 1, 1950, and was survived by his wife Sadie, a sister, and two brothers. His death was also noted by a short obituary in the London-based Freedom, an anarchist fortnightly newspaper. His papers are part of the Labadie Collection at the University of Michigan.
