= Cristești, Botoșani =

Cristești
- Commune
- Location in Botoșani County

- Location in Romania
- Coordinates: 47°38′N 26°44′E
- Country: Romania
- County: Botoșani
- Subdivisions: Cristești, Oneaga, Schit-Orășeni, Unguroaia

Government
  - Mayor (2024–2028): Ionel-Lucian Borfotină (PSD)
- Area: 78.07 km^{2} (30.14 sq mi)
- Elevation: 140 m (460 ft)
- Population (2021-12-01): 4,907
  - Density: 63/km^{2} (160/sq mi)
- Time zone: EET/EEST (UTC+2/+3)
- Postal code: 717100
- Area code: +40 x31
- Vehicle reg.: BT
- Website: primariacristesti.ro

Cristești is a commune in Botoșani County, Western Moldavia, Romania. It is composed of four villages: Cristești, Oneaga, Schit-Orășeni, and Unguroaia.

== Natives ==
- Dorin Alupei
- Joseph Ishill
