= Jo Labadie =

American labor leader (1850–1933)

Joseph Labadie
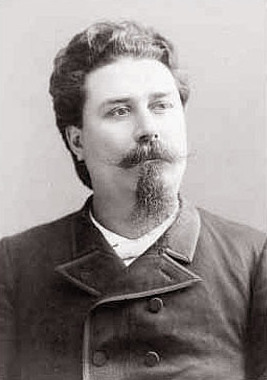
- Labadie c. 1880
- Born: Charles Joseph Antoine Labadie; April 18, 1850; Paw Paw, Michigan, U.S.
- Died: October 7, 1933 (aged 83); Detroit, Michigan, U.S.
- Occupation: Labor leader

Charles Joseph Antoine Labadie (April 18, 1850 – October 7, 1933) was an American labor organizer, anarchist, Greenbacker, libertarian socialist, social activist, printer, publisher, essayist, and poet.

== Biography ==
=== Early years ===
Jo Labadie was born on April 18, 1850, in Paw Paw, Michigan, to Anthony Labadie and Euphrosyne Labadie, who were both first cousins and descendants of seventeenth-century French immigrants of the Labadie family who had settled on both sides of the Detroit River. His boyhood was a frontier existence among Potawatomi tribes in southern Michigan, where his father served as interpreter between Jesuit missionaries and Native Americans. His only formal schooling was a few months in a parochial school.

Labadie began five years of "tramp" printing and then settled in Detroit as a printer for the Detroit Post and Tribune. He married his first cousin, Sophie Elizabeth Archambeau, in 1877, despite him being agnostic and her being Catholic. Their children were Laura, Charlotte, and Laurance Labadie; the latter was also a prominent anarchist essayist. The family was also involved in the film and the entertainment industry in the Detroit area.

=== Political life ===
Labadie joined the newly formed Socialist Labor Party of America chapter in Detroit at the age of 27 and soon was distributing socialist tracts on street corners. As a printer, he was also a member of Detroit's Typographical Union 18 and was one of its two delegates to the International Typographical Union convention in Detroit in 1878.

In 1878, Labadie organized Detroit's first assembly of the Knights of Labor, and ran unsuccessfully for mayor on the Greenback-Labor Party ticket. In 1880, he served as first president of the Detroit Trades Council, and he continued issuing a succession of labor papers and columns for the national labor press, including the Detroit Times, Advance and Labor Leaf, Labor Review, The Socialist, and the Lansing Sentinel, which were admired for their forthright style. His column, "Cranky Notions", was widely published.

In 1883, Labadie embraced individualist anarchism, a non-violent doctrine. He became closely allied with Benjamin Tucker, the country's foremost exponent of that doctrine, and frequently wrote for the latter's publication, Liberty. Without the oppression of the state, Labadie believed, humans would choose to harmonize with "the great natural laws...without robbing [their] fellows through interest, profit, rent and taxes." Labadie supported localized public cooperation and was an advocate for community control of water utilities, streets, and railroads. He also criticized capitalism, saying it "has had its day" and "it must go." Although Labadie did not support the militant anarchism of the Haymarket anarchists (the agitators behind the Haymarket Riot), he fought for the clemency of the accused because he did not believe they were the sole perpetrators of violence. He broke with the Knights of Labor when their national leader, Terence V. Powderly, repudiated the defendants completely.

In 1888, Labadie organized the Michigan Federation of Labor, becoming its first president, and forged a tenuous alliance with Samuel Gompers. At age fifty, he began writing verse and publishing artistically handcrafted booklets. In 1908, the city postal inspector refused to handle his mail because it bore stickers with anarchist quotations. A month later, the Detroit Water Board, where Labadie worked as a clerk, dismissed him from his post for expressing anarchist sentiments. In both cases, public officials were forced to back down in the face of mass public protests in support of Labadie, well known to Detroit citizens as its "Gentle Anarchist".

=== Collector of ephemera ===
In about 1910, when he was 60 years old, Labadie began to prepare for the preservation of the vast collection of pamphlets, newspapers, and correspondence which he had accumulated in the attic of his home. The collection was eagerly sought by the University of Wisconsin, one of the paramount repositories of materials relating to labor and socialist history in the United States, but Labadie spurned their offer of $500 (equivalent to $17,277 in 2025) for the collection. The libraries of Johns Hopkins University and Michigan State University also made attempts to acquire the collection.

Labadie sought instead to keep the material as near to his hometown of Detroit as possible and contacted the University of Michigan in Ann Arbor about its potential acquisition of the material. While the University of Michigan was slow to show interest in the collection, an investigator was eventually dispatched. The report returned on Labadie's collection was negative, dismissed as a great mass of "stuff." Labadie remained persistent, however, and he eventually convinced nine Detroit residents, including several businesspeople, to donate $100 each toward the purchase of the collection, which was then presented to the university with requisite pomp.

In 1912, twenty crates of material were moved from Labadie's attic to Ann Arbor, forming the foundation of the renowned Labadie Collection of radical literature. Labadie spent his later years soliciting donations to the collection from friends and acquaintances, donating hundreds more items himself to the library in 1926. Agnes Inglis cataloged and organized the collection. The collection thus preserved is today regarded as among the finest accumulations of 19th-century radical ephemera in the United States.

=== Death and legacy ===
Joseph Labadie died on October 7, 1933, in Detroit, Michigan, at the age of 83. He donated the vast majority of manuscripts and ephemera acquired in his lifetime to the collection at the University of Michigan Library, a deed which he viewed as his primary legacy.

== See also ==
- Benjamin Tucker
- Labadie Collection
- Laurance Labadie

== Works ==
- "Is Tyranny a Necessity?", Liberty, vol. 10, no. 21, whole no. 307, (February 23, 1895), pg. 7.

=== "Cranky Notions" column ===
- "Cranky Notions" (Nov. 11, 1885), The Labor Leaf (Detroit), vol. 2, no. 1 (November 11, 1885), pg. 2.
- "Cranky Notions" (Jan. 14, 1888), Liberty, vol. 5, no. 12, whole no. 116. (January 14, 1888), pg. 7.
- "Cranky Notions" (Jan. 28, 1888), Liberty, vol. 5, no. 13, whole no. 117. (January 28, 1888), pg. 4.
- "Cranky Notions" (Feb. 25, 1888), Liberty, vol. 5, no. 15, whole no. 119. (February 25, 1888), pg. 7.
- "Cranky Notions" (Mar. 31, 1888), Liberty, vol. 5, no. 17, whole no. 121. (March 31, 1888), pg. 7.
- "Cranky Notions" (April 14, 1888), Liberty, vol. 5, no. 18, whole no. 122. (April 14, 1888), pg. 8.
- "Cranky Notions" (May 26, 1888), Liberty, vol. 5, no. 21, whole no. 125. (May 26, 1888), pg. 5.
- "Cranky Notions" (April 18, 1891), Liberty, vol. 7, no. 26, whole no. 182. (April 18, 1891), pg. 3.
- "Cranky Notions" (July 1921), Ego, vol. III, no. 7 (July 1921), pp. 4-5.
- "Cranky Notions" (October 1925), The Mutualist, vol. V, no. 1, whole no. 49 (October 1925), pg. 7.
