= Hector De Claire =

French-American tailor

- Born: 1836; Lille, Nord, France
- Died: May 27, 1906 (aged 69–70); Milwaukee, Wisconsin, United States
- Other name: "August de Cleyre"
- Occupation: Tailor
- Spouse: Harriet Elizabeth Billings (m. 1861; sep. 1873)
- Children: Marion; Adelaide; Voltairine
- Parents: Carlos Ludovicus Decleire (father); Victoria Decleire, née Bailliue (mother)
- Military career
- Allegiance: United States
- Service: Union Army
- Service years: 1861–1865
- Conflicts: American Civil War

Hector De Claire (1836 – May 27, 1906) was a French-American tailor. Born into a Catholic family in Lille, he became a socialist and a freethinker at an early age. He emigrated to the United States, where he became a US citizen after fighting for the Union Army in the American Civil War. He plied his trade as an itinerant worker in Michigan, where he married Harriet Elizabeth Billings and had three children: Marion, Adelaide and Voltairine. After Marion's death at a young age, the family moved to St. Johns, where they lived in extreme poverty. To find better work, he left his family and moved to Port Huron, where he was later joined by his daughter Voltairine. He paid for her education at a Catholic school in Canada, after which he resumed itinerant labor and later retired to Milwaukee, Wisconsin, where he died.

== Biography ==
=== Early life ===
Hector De Claire was born in 1836, in the Northern French city of Lille. Raised in a Catholic family, he developed a deep sense of skepticism from an early age. By the outbreak of the French Revolution of 1848, he had also adopted his father's socialist politics. In 1854, De Claire turned eighteen and decided to emigrate to the United States, along with his brother. Upon the outbreak of the American Civil War, they volunteered to fight in the Union Army, for which they were consequently granted citizenship of the United States.

=== Family life in Michigan ===
De Claire moved to Michigan and took up work as a tailor, moving between towns as a migrant worker. While he was in Kalamazoo, he met Harriet Elizabeth Billings, whom he married on March 28, 1861. They moved to Leslie, where they had three daughters: Marion (b. May 26, 1862), Adelaide (b. March 10, 1864) and Voltairine (b. November 17, 1866). Despite protests from his Puritan wife, he named their youngest after the French philosopher Voltaire; Adelaide later speculated that it was because he had wanted a boy.

In May 1867, their daughter Marion died, having accidentally drowned in a river. The loss of their first child was psychologically devastating for the De Claires, who subsequently decided to move away to a small house in St. Johns. The family was plunged into extreme poverty, with Hector attempting to make a living as a tailor, while Harriet worked as a seamstress to support their income. Despite the financial difficulties, they managed to pay for their daughters' meager food, clothing and education. But their situation caused friction between the De Claire couple, with Hector becoming increasingly bitter and demanding over the years. In a letter to the anarchist printer Joseph Ishill, Adelaide recalled that Hector's life had been "such a disappointment to himself". Although she said that "in his way he was kind to us", she also spoke of his "impulsive nature", while his future grandson Harry went so far as to call him a "petty tyrant"; in letters to Voltairine, he repeatedly scolded her for writing in pencil.

=== Move to Port Huron ===
Their financial situation got even worse during the early 1870s, as Hector found it more difficult to find work in St. Johns, where many people practiced sewing at home and had no need of a tailor. He returned again to itinerant labor, eventually settling down in Port Huron. He never returned home to St. Johns, but sent money back to his family when he could. Separation from his daughters made them even more unhappy. In 1879, Voltairine was sent to live with him in Port Huron, after Adelaide became seriously ill and their mother was unable to care for them both. But the adolescent Voltairine hated the city and frequently expressed her wish to return home, despite Hector's attempts to cheer her up with Sunday visits to the local park. As he worked twelve-hour days and was unable to cope with parenting a teenage girl, in September 1880, he decided to enroll her in a Convent in the Canadian city of Sarnia. Hippolyte Havel speculated that it was Hector's intention for Voltairine to become a nun, but this assertion was rejected by both Adelaide and Voltairine's own biographer Paul Avrich.

De Claire hoped that the convent would discipline his daughter with its rules and regulations, and "cure her" of her love of idle reading. But he also recognized Voltairine's intelligence and wanted to provide her with the best education he could, working long hours to pay for her tuition and accommodation; according to Adelaide, her father nearly "crippled him[self] financially." Voltairine never understood her father's decision to send her there and never forgave him for doing so. Within weeks she attempted to escape the convent, but was brought back by her father. Hector informed Harriet that she would need to censor herself while writing to their daughter, as the nuns closely monitored all correspondence. When the nuns kept one of Adelaide's letters from reaching Voltairine, Hector had to intervene for them to release it to her. When Voltairine was allowed to visit Hector in Port Huron, she seized the opportunity to pen an uncensored letter to her mother, without the nuns being able to read it.

=== Later life, death and memory ===
Once Voltairine was seventeen, she graduated from the convent and returned home to St. Johns. Soon after, Hector left Port Huron. He converted back to Catholicism and returned to itinerant work, drifting again between the various towns of Michigan. He moved from Flint, back to Port Huron, then on to Lansing, before heading west to settle in Milwaukee, Wisconsin, where he spent the final years of his life. Hector De Claire died on May 27, 1906, aged seventy-one, at the Milwaukee Soldiers Home. He died having not seen his daughter Adelaide in two decades; she later described him as a "poor old man". His other daughter Voltairine, who at the time was recovering from a severe illness, wrote to her mother that "He hadn't much out of his life either, had he?"

De Claire's daughter, Voltairine de Cleyre, attributed her "opposition to things as they are" in part to her father's socialist politics. His other daughter, Adelaide D. Thayer, described him as a "brilliant man". In her biographical essay on Voltairine de Cleyre, Emma Goldman erroneously listed Hector as "August de Cleyre".

== Bibliography ==
- Avrich, Paul (1978). An American Anarchist: The Life of Voltairine de Cleyre. Princeton: Princeton University Press. ISBN 978-0-691-04657-0.
- Baillargeon, Normand; Santerre, Chantal, eds. (2018). "Présentation. La bannière de la révolte, l'étendard de la liberté: la vie et l'œuvre de Voltairine de Cleyre". Écrits d'une insoumise (in French). Lux Éditeur. ISBN 978-2-89596-923-5.
- Bernard, Michèle (2010). "Femmes et féminisme au Québec, témoignages et essais". Nuit Blanche, le Magazine du Livre (in French) (117): 34–37.
- Daub, Peggy; Herrada, Julie (1997). Challenging Religious Dogma: A History of Free Thought. University of Michigan Library. pp. 39–41. hdl:2027.42/120294.
- Presley, Sharon (2005). "Emma Goldman's 'Voltairine de Cleyre': A Moving but Flawed Tribute". In Sharon, Presley; Sartwell, Crispin (eds.). Exquisite Rebel: The Essays of Voltairine De Cleyre – Anarchist, Feminist, Genius. Albany: State University of New York Press. pp. 27–28. ISBN 978-0-7914-6094-8.
