= Laurance Labadie =

American anarchist (1898–1975)

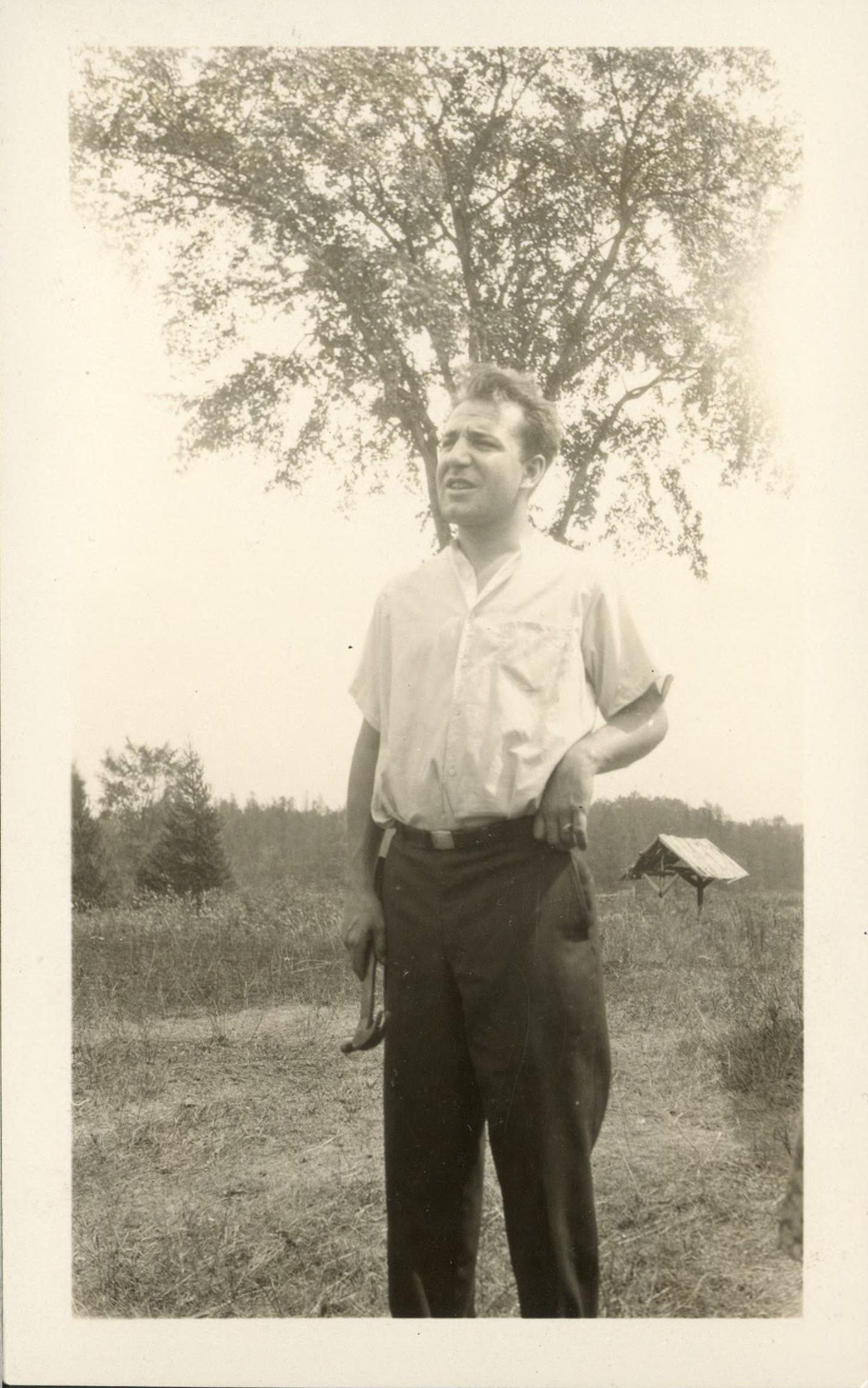
- Born: June 4, 1898
- Died: August 12, 1975 (aged 77)
- Occupation: Author
- Parent(s): Joseph Labadie, Sophie Labadie

Laurance Labadie (June 4, 1898 – August 12, 1975) was an American individualist anarchist and author. Jo Labadie was his father.

== Career ==
Labadie worked in the car industry in Detroit, Michigan.

Labadie became an anarchist author, at first mainly republishing articles of previous anarchist authors, and in the late 1930s he started to publish his own work.

In Anarchism Applied to Economics Labadie writes: "In a world where inequality of ability is inevitable, anarchists do not sanction any attempt to produce equality by artificial or authoritarian means. The only equality they posit and will strive their utmost to defend is the equality of opportunity. This necessitates the maximum amount of freedom for each individual. This will not necessarily result in equality of incomes or of wealth but will result in returns proportionate to services rendered. Free competition will see to that." (Labadie's emphasis)

Labadie was a supporter of jury nullification in an anarchist society. He criticised Murray Rothbard's proposed judicial system which would not allow jury nullification, saying it would uphold, "the very economic evils which are at bottom the very reason for human contention and conflict."

Labadie was a strong critic of capitalism, referring to it as a system of "government protection and coddling" and its defect being the want of competition, and was an exponent of anti-capitalist individualism associated with Benjamin Tucker.

Labadie was involved with multiple anarchist journals. Besides his Discussion, he was also a contributor to A Way Out, The Interpreter and Journal of Human Relations. There he often engaged in debates with or critique contemporary anarchists and libertarians, such as Murray Rothbard, S.E. Parker and Ayn Rand.

== Personal life ==
Labadie was born on June 4, 1898. He was youngest child of Sophie and Jo Labadie. He was influenced by his father, and by age of 16 he was involved in labor movement. He worked as a machinist in Detroit and was self taught. During the Great Depression, he started his anarchist career with his periodical Discussion - A Journal of Free Spirits.

In World War II, Laurence retired from his work and focused on anarchism. He met Ralph Borsodi and his School of Living in late 40s and remained friends with him until his death. After the death of Borsodi's wife, he moved to (and purchase) Borsodi's Dogwoods Homestead in Suffern, New York. He spent the rest of his life as a recluse, contributing to various libertarian journals. He died on August 12, 1975.

Laurence Labadie was also a friend of monetary theorist Edwin Clarence Riegel and historian James J. Martin. He had no wife or kids but was fond of kids.

== See also ==
- Individualist anarchism
- Individualist anarchism in the United States
- Liberty (1881-1908)
- Lysander Spooner
- Benjamin Tucker
