= Labadie Collection =

Anarchist library collection at the University of Michigan

Coordinates: 42°16′35″N 83°44′17″W

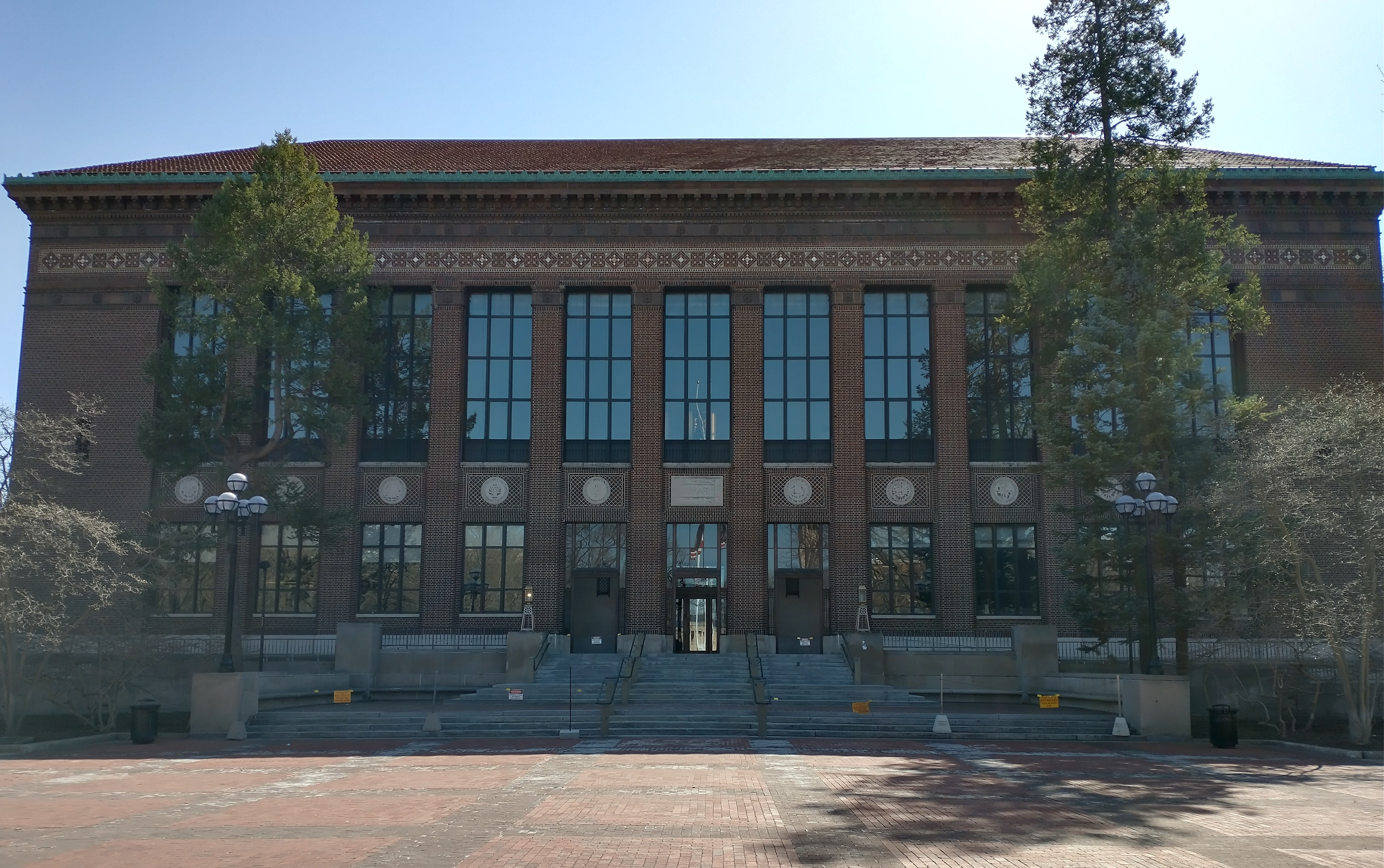
The Labadie Collection is held at the Harlan Hatcher Graduate Library at the University of Michigan.

The Labadie Collection at the University of Michigan, originating from the collection of radical ephemera built by the Detroit anarchist Jo Labadie, is recognized as one of the world's most complete collections of materials documenting the history of anarchism and other radical movements from the 19th century to the present.

== History ==
=== Creation of the collection ===
The Labadie Collection became a part of the Special Collections Library (then called the Rare Book Room) in 1964. It is named after individualist anarchist Joseph Labadie (1850–1933). With the help of his wife, Sophie, Labadie collected and carefully preserved a vast amount of literature on social movements from the 1870s to his death in 1933, including his own writings and publications. Although offers for this unique and valuable collection came from several institutions, including the University of Wisconsin, "Jo", as he was known, insisted it should go to the University of Michigan. Not only did he want it to be geographically closer to him, but he also felt the conservative Michigan institution needed some ideological balance in its collections. In a 1912 letter to John R. Commons of the University of Wisconsin, Labadie thanked him for trying to acquire his collection, and said, "I made up my mind it should go where it was most needed—old moss-back Michigan,—conservative, reactionary, and positively crass in some things... I know how well you Wisconsin folk would have done with it, but when you consider what a light it will be to the U of M, I know your discernment will approve my conduct in the matter."

The exact size of the original contribution is unknown, but the first shipment arrived in 1912 in about 20 boxes. In addition to materials created on Labadie's printing press and his vast correspondence, there were books, pamphlets, by-laws, newspapers, newsletters, announcements, membership cards, photographs, broadsides, and badges reflecting his activities in various labor and protest movements. Although the Board of Regents accepted the gift, the conservative library administration was at a loss as to what to do with this radical trove of literature. For years after the materials were deposited in the Library, nothing was done with them. Inquiring researchers would be given a key and sent into a locked cage area on their own, left with boxes of unaccessioned, unprocessed and uncataloged materials. Items undoubtedly disappeared.

=== Help from Agnes Inglis ===
This might have remained the fate of the materials had it not been for wealthy Detroit activist, Agnes Inglis, who began doing research in the Labadie Collection in the early 1920s. Inglis had already been involved in radical political activities, organizing lectures for Emma Goldman, other anarchists and the IWW, and rallying support for labor and civil liberties causes, and assisting and even putting up bail money for World War I draft law violators and political prisoners. Her family eventually reduced her allowance to a modest living stipend so that she would not squander her inheritance on radical causes, as she was likely to do.

Inglis was acquainted with Jo and Sophie Labadie, and knew of their donation to the Library. After her first encounter with the Labadie Collection her inherent organizing instincts took over, and she stayed to "sort out" the materials and bring some order to the chaos. This decision changed her life, for she stayed at the Labadie Collection for over 20 years as the collection's unofficial curator. Inglis donated her time to the effort, working without a salary except for one brief period when she received a small stipend.

Inglis died at age 81 on January 29, 1952. Despite the promise of Dr. Warner Rice, the new head Librarian, that the library would continue to add to the Labadie Collection, Inglis was not replaced for several years. The Collection was neglected, or worse, was ravaged by the unsupervised patrons who were given free access to its carefully cataloged contents. As a result, Inglis's precise filing and locating system has been lost (though her index cards, mostly handwritten with notes and analytics, are still in use today, filed in an old card catalog).

=== Direction under Edward Weber ===
In 1960, Edward Weber, who had been working as a reference librarian in the Social Sciences section of the Library, was assigned full-time to the Labadie Collection. Weber brought his own anti-authoritarian attitude with him, in keeping with the spirit of the Collection and carrying on its tradition. Weber also brought his own social/political interests, which included the radical elements of sexual freedom, gay liberation, Freethought, and civil liberties. Because there was still no acquisitions budget, Weber relied on donations and sympathetic library workers, who "adjusted" the accounts somehow and funneled subversive literature into the Collection. Weber was an outspoken critic of censorship and ignorance, as well as a prolific letter writer, and the extensive correspondence he generated throughout his 40-year tenure kept the Collection growing.

In 1964, the head of the university library, Frederick H. Wagman, inspired by Ralph Ellsworth's work at the University of Iowa, directed Weber to start collecting materials on the right as well as the left, so the library got onto the mailing lists of some White-supremacist and ultra conservative organizations. Weber began applying a broader interpretation to the Collection to reflect changing times and movements. His ingenuity and connections both within and outside the library helped bring in materials not many other institutions were collecting at that time: pamphlets and posters from the student, gay, civil rights, anti-war and Black, Chicano, and women's liberation movements, as well as underground newspapers, leaflets, political buttons, and other ephemera. It was not until the mid-1970s that the Labadie Collection was finally given a book budget. Weber was, for the first time in the history of the Collection, able to make legitimate purchases.

In 1994 Julie Herrada was hired as the first Assistant Curator, and first trained archivist in the Labadie Collection. When Weber retired in 2000, Herrada took over as curator.

== Holdings ==
The Collection currently contains over 50,000 books, 8,000 serials titles (including nearly 800 current periodical subscriptions) records and tape recordings of speeches, debates, songs, and oral histories, sheet music, buttons, posters, photographs, and comics. On the Labadie Collection's website one can view over 900 photographs, read descriptions of over 100 archival collections, peruse listings of some non-print materials, explore its online exhibitions, and browse a directory of nearly 9,000 subject files, containing brochures, leaflets, clippings, and other ephemera.

Since its creation in 1911 hundreds of people have made donations out of trunks, attics, garages, basements, and even prison cells. In addition to anarchism, in which the Collection is particularly strong, other topics include socialism, communism, primitivism, labor (especially late 19th and early 20th century), sexual freedom (including the gay liberation movement), animal liberation, feminism, ecology, youth and student protest, censorship, Black liberation movements, anti-war and pacifist movements, and the radical right. After his arrest, Theodore Kaczynski, also known as the Unabomber, officially designated the University of Michigan as the recipient of his writings, letters, and other papers for the Collection. Kaczynski's writings, which the Labadie agreed to collect in 2000, are among the most popular archives in the University of Michigan's special collections.

The university's online catalog includes the Labadie holdings. Some of the Labadie's collections have been digitized for online access.
