= Joseph Ishill =

Romanian-born Jewish anarchist typesetter and bookbinder

Joseph Ishill (February 11, 1888 – March 14, 1966) was a Romanian-born Jewish anarchist typesetter and bookbinder who worked with The Modern School. A commercial typesetter for most of his life, Ishill is most well known for his work with The Oriole Press, which he and his wife, Rose Florence Freeman founded in 1926.

== Biography ==
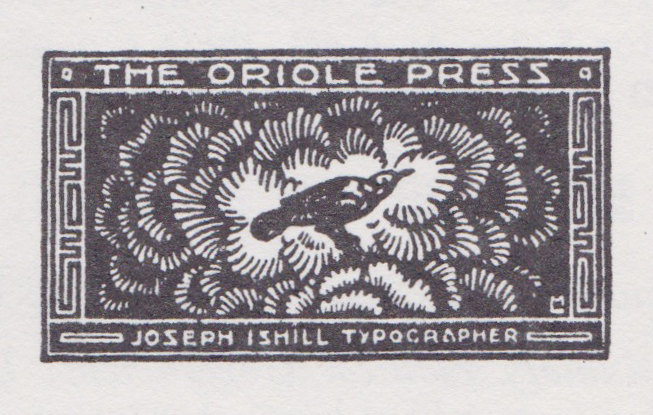
Oriole Press colophon, from Manifesto (A Rare and Interesting Document), by Josiah Warren. Introductory Note by Joseph Ishill. Berkeley Heights, N.J.: Oriole Press, 1952.

Joseph Ishill, born Joseph Ishileanu, grew up in a Jewish farming family in Cristești, Botoșani County in the Western Moldavia province of Romania on February 11, 1888. At age fourteen, Ishill was apprenticed to a typesetter in Botoșani. In 1907 he began his first printed periodical, The Wandering Jew, followed by his autobiographical Balkan Episodes, about his youth.

After a period of travel, Ishill eventually settled in Bucharest, where he befriended and was heavily influenced by the anarchist writer and activist Panait Mușoiu. Identifying strongly with the work of Henry David Thoreau at this time, Ishill became a strict, lifelong vegetarian.

Ishill moved to the United States in 1909 at the age of 21, and found work as a commercial typesetter in New York City. He moved to the Stelton Colony (also known as the Ferrer Colony) in 1915, shortly after its founding in Middlesex County, New Jersey. Here he built a one-room cottage for himself, and taught typesetting and printing at the Ferrer Modern School in the colony. During this time he printed the colony’s periodical, The Modern School. He also facilitated the printing of Path of Joy, a magazine directed, written and typeset by the children of the colony.

Ishill met his wife and collaborator, the poet Rose Florence Freeman-Ishill, at a Thanksgiving ball fundraiser for the Modern School in New York in 1916. They married in 1917, and moved briefly to Bronx, New York in 1918, where their first child was born. The family eventually settled in Berkeley Heights, New Jersey in 1919, and continued their relationship with the Ferrer Modern School until 1927. Together they had three children: a son, Anatole, and two daughters, Crystal and Oriole.

Throughout his life, Ishill worked as a commercial typesetter in New York City, making a daily commute from his rural home. He spent his evenings working on his own printing projects, focusing later in his life on producing small, private editions of work by accomplished radical authors. Because he rarely sold the books and pamphlets for which he later became known, Ishill and his family subsisted entirely on his typesetter’s wage.

Joseph Ishill and Rose Florence Freeman-Ishill founded The Oriole Press, essentially renaming their prior endeavor, Free Spirit Press, in 1926. Although Joseph Ishill is singularly credited with running The Oriole Press, Rose Freeman-Ishill regularly worked as translator, and copyedited most or all of his work prior to print.

The Ishill family briefly lived in Gainesville, Florida, where Joseph took a post as University of Florida’s printer in residence in 1964. They soon returned to Berkeley Heights, where they remained until Joseph’s death on March 14, 1966.

== Selected works ==
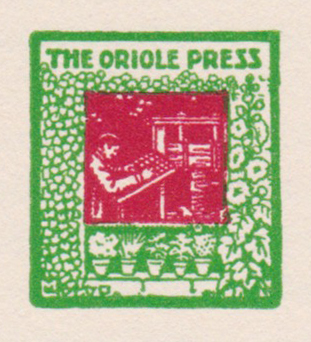
Oriole Press colophon by Louis Moreau, from The Oriole Press - Privately Conducted by Joseph Ishill. Berkeley Heights, N.J.: Oriole Press, 1958.

From 1919 to 1921, Ishill and Freeman-Ishill collaborated on The Free Spirit, a literary review. Joseph also collaborated with Hippolyte Havel on several issues of Open Vistas in 1925.

Ishill is primarily known for the limited, private editions that he and Freeman created as The Oriole Press. He hand-printed some 250 books and pamphlets in small runs of 100 - 200 per edition, sometimes taking upwards of two years to finish larger books. Very few copies of these editions were sold, with most given either to friends, correspondents, or those who he deemed “could not otherwise afford fine printing”. Ishill published works by several noted radical authors, including Peter Kropotkin, Elisee and Elie Reclus, Havelock Ellis, Voltairine de Cleyre, Benjamin Tucker, Dyer D. Lum, and Pierre-Joseph Proudhon.

Ishill also kept up regular correspondence with many prominent international anarchist writers and activists of his era. He filed these letters meticulously, and later sold the collection to Harvard University. Much of his other collected correspondence was donated by his daughter Crystal (Ishill) Mendelsohn to the University of Florida.
