= Agriculture in Germany =

Aspect of German economy

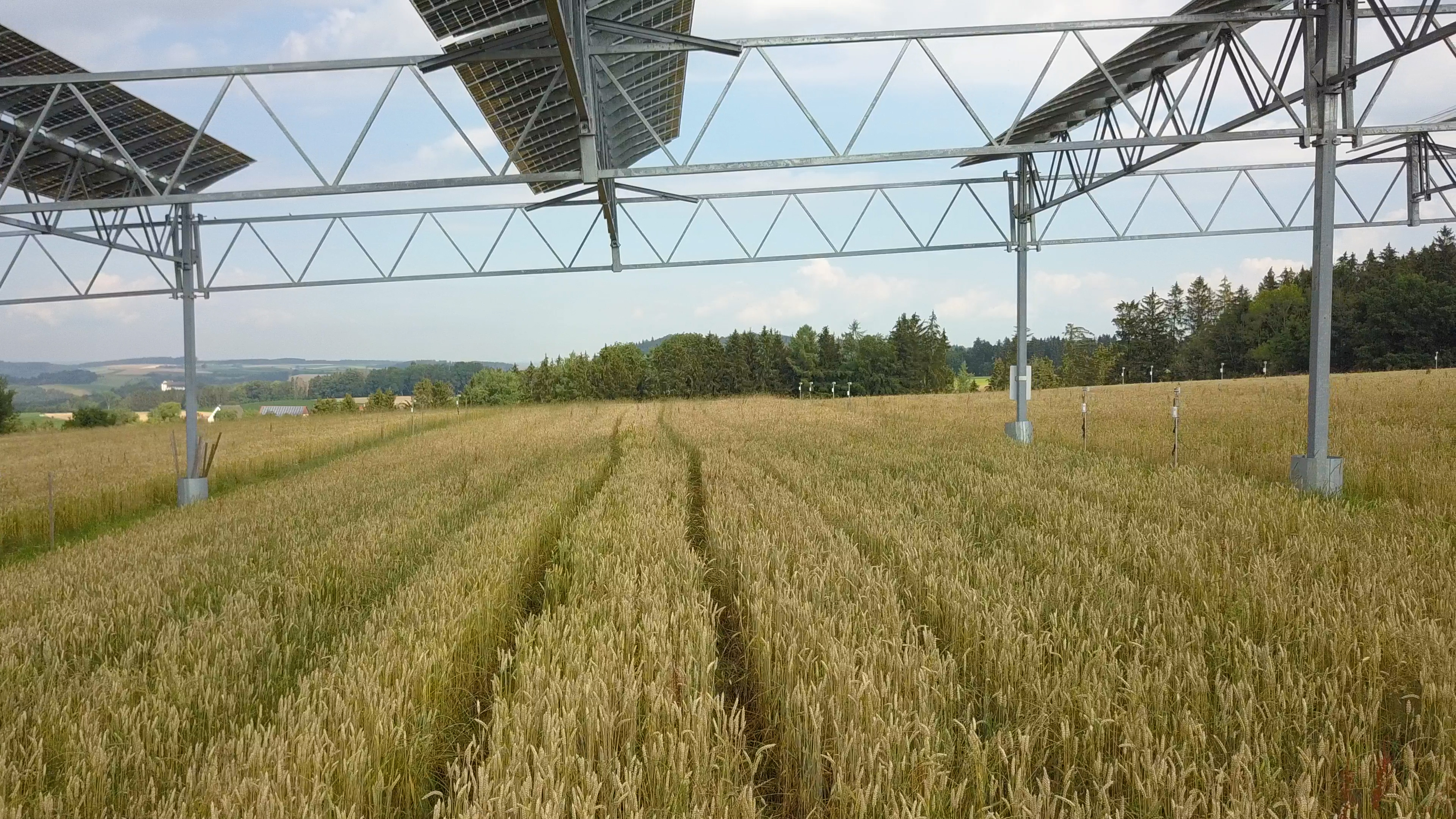
Aerial shot of the agrivoltaics pilot plant at Heggelbach farming community

In 2021, Germany was the third largest importer and exporter of consumer oriented agricultural products worldwide, and by far the most important European market for foreign producers. The retail market's key characteristics are consolidation, market saturation, strong competition and low prices. Germany is an attractive and cost-efficient location in the center of the EU. While many consumers are very price sensitive, the market also provides many wealthy consumers who follow value-for-money concepts. These consumers are looking for premium quality products and are willing to pay higher prices. Germany still has some of the lowest food prices in Europe, and German citizens spend only about 14 percent of their income on food and beverages. Low food prices are a result of high competition between discounters and the grocery retail sale segment.

== History ==
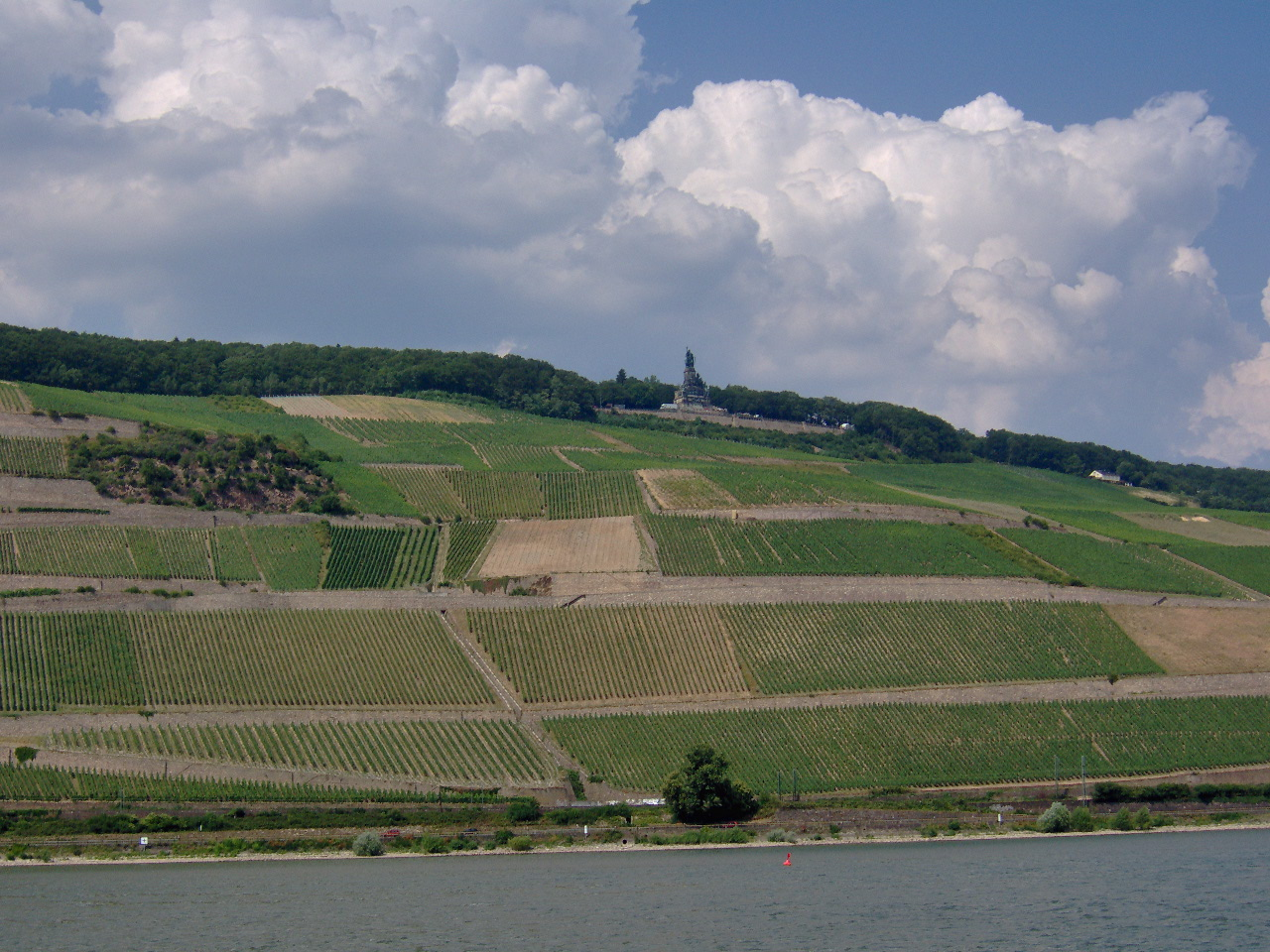
Historic German wine region Rheingau. Germany is the 7th biggest wine exporter by market share.

Germany's climate has historically favored production of hardy vegetables (like turnips, cabbage and onions), as well as barley, which is reflected in German cuisine.

Germany imported about a third of its food supplies in 1914. These imports were targeted from the start of the First World War. Five million pigs were slaughtered in 1915 and there were food riots in Berlin. By 1916 German food was all rationed, and the winter of 1916–17 became known as Kohlrübenwinter (Turnip Winter) as people were forced to eat the turnips which were normally fed to animals. Weather was poor and there were manpower shortages. There was widespread malnutrition. After the war there was much determination to achieve self-sufficiency in food, and this was a mainspring of Lebensraum policies.

The number of farms decreased steadily in West Germany, from 1.6 million in 1950 to 630,000 in 1990. In East Germany, where farms were collectivized under the socialist regime in the 1960s, there had been about 5,100 agricultural production collectives, with an average of 4,100 hectares under cultivation. Since unification, about three-quarters of the collectives have remained as cooperatives, partnerships, or joint-stock companies. Other East German collectives were broken up, ownership reverting primarily to the individual farmers who had been accorded post-war title to their lands; or were privately sold, becoming about 14,000 private farms. The terms of the 1990 Unification Treaty precluded former agricultural land owners, expropriated by the Soviet Occupation authorities, from reclaiming their vast pre-war agricultural estates. In western Germany and in the newly privatized farms in eastern Germany, family farms predominate. In the 630,000 farms, there are 750,000 full-time employees. There are also, however, many more part-time employees, and most farms do not represent their owners' full-time occupation.

Although the number of farms has declined, production has actually increased through more efficient production methods. By early 1990, a single farmer could produce enough food for 75 people, far more than was the case in the 1950s or 1960s.

== Production ==
Agricultural products vary from region to region. In the flat terrain of northern Germany and especially in the eastern portions, cereals and sugar beets are grown. Elsewhere, with the terrain more hilly and even mountainous, farmers produce vegetables, milk, pork, or beef. Almost all large cities are surrounded by fruit orchards and vegetable farms. Most river valleys in southern and western Germany, especially along the Rhine and the Main, have vineyards. Beer is produced mainly, but not exclusively, in Bavaria. Wine is produced mainly, but not exclusively, in Rhineland-Palatinate.

Production of foodstuffs in Germany in 2018 (not complete)
Foodstuff	Quantity (millions of tons)		World ranking	Notes
Sugar beet	26	.1	4	Serves to produce sugar and ethanol
Wheat	20	.2	10	
Barley	9	.5	3	Behind only Russia and France
Potato	8	.9	7	
Rapeseed	3	.6	6	
Rye	2	.2	1	
Triticale	1	.9	2	
Grape	1	.4	16	
Apple	1	.2	12	
Maize	3	.3		
Cabbage	0	.604		
Carrot	0	.625		
Oats	0	.577		
Onion	0	.409		

== German agriculture and EU ==
Since the 1960s, German agricultural policy has not been made in Germany but in the EC. All agricultural laws and regulations are written in Brussels, often after difficult negotiations between food-producing and food-consuming member states. The main objective of those negotiations is to obtain high incomes for the farmers while keeping market prices low enough to avoid consumer protests. To make up the difference, the EC adopted the Common Agricultural Policy subsidy program and the export subsidy program, both of which benefit German farmers as well as other EU farmers. In return, the German farmers have complied with European directives on the quality and quantity of production.

Germany embraces the EU's Farm to Fork spirit with nutrition strategy plans, With plans for a national nutrition strategy along the lines of the EU Farm to Form, German agriculture minister Cem Özdemir wants to make diets healthier and more plant-based, but some say the proposal dictates what people can and cannot eat.

== Impacts of climate change ==
Warming in Germany has affected some parts of the German agricultural industry. In particular, warming since at least 1988 in the Southwest wine-growing regions has caused a decline in the output of ice wine, a product particularly vulnerable to warming. In 2019, almost no ice wine was produced due to lack of sufficiently cold days.

A key reason why the state of Mecklenburg-Western Pomerania is particularly vulnerable to climate change among northern provinces is that it is a relatively poor region of Germany with a large agricultural sector.

In July 2026, president of the German Farmers' Association Joachim Rukwied warned that a period of extreme heat in June, combined with falling producer prices, rising costs due to fertilizer and diesel prices and excessive red tape, could result in heavy wheat harvest losses during the season.

== See also ==
- Agriculture in East Germany
- Food and agriculture in Nazi Germany
- Plantation
- German wine
