= Süreyyya Evren =

Turkish writer and cultural theorist

- Born: 1972; Istanbul, Turkey

Academic background
- Education: Loughborough University
- Thesis: What is Anarchism? A Reflection on the Canon and The Constructive Potential of Its Destruction
- Doctoral advisor: Ruth Kinna

Süreyyya Evren (born 1972) is a Turkish postanarchist writer and cultural theorist. Evren founded the Turkish postanarchist magazine Siyahi (2005-2006) and the postanarchist journal Anarchist Developments in Cultural Studies.

== Career ==
During the 2005-2006 period, Evren and Halil Altındere began working on a book about contemporary art in Turkey. In an interview with the Los Angeles Review of Books, Evren said that they "thought it could serve as a source of information about what had happened in the Turkish art world in the past and what was happening at the time". This led to the creation of their User's Manual: Contemporary Art in Turkey 1986–2006 which was published in 2007. Its success led to a second edition, User's Manual 2.0: Contemporary Art in Turkey 1975–2015, published in 2015. User's Manual 2.0 was launched as the first program of a collective initiative of SALT and Robinson Crusoe 389 titled: "Becoming a Book". The publication was a collaboration between Istanbul-based Art-ist and Berlin-based Revolver publishing.

Evren completed a PhD at Loughborough University. He wrote a 2012 doctoral dissertation, supervised by Ruth Kinna, titled What is Anarchism? A Reflection on the Canon and The Constructive Potential of Its Destruction. Through his dissertation, Evren engaged with the influence of and context surrounding The Great Anarchists (1900) by Paul Eltzbacher and Anarchism (1962) by George Woodcock.

Evren curated the "Lock Your Mind" Berlin-Istanbul exhibition in 2004, co-curated the "Go Get Them Tiger!" exhibition in Vienna 2013 with Burak Delier, and also curated Şener Özmen's (2016) exhibition "Unfiltered". With Aylime Aslı Demir, Evren co-curated the sixth edition of Read My World Festival in Amsterdam.

== Publications ==
=== Novels ===
- Postmodern Bir Kız Sevdim (I Loved A Postmodern Girl, 1993)
- Yaşayıp Ölmek Aşk ve Avarelik Üzerine Kısa Bir Roman (A Short Novel on Living and Dying, Love and Idleness, 1994)
- Ur Lokantası (Tumor Restaurant, 1999)
- Viyana Nokta (2017)
- Yakınafrika (2018)
- Ortadoğu'da Bir Ülkenin Acil Durum Alarmı (2023)

=== Short stories ===
- Zaman Zeman Öyküleri (Stories of Time, 1995)
- Hepimiz Gogol'un Palto'sundan Çıktık (We All Came out of Gogol's Overcoat, 2001)
- Buruşuk Arzular (Crumpled Desires, 2004).

=== Other ===
- User's Manual: Contemporary Art in Turkey 1986–2006 (2007)
  - User's Manual 2.0: Contemporary Art in Turkey 1975–2015 (2015, co-editor)
- Genç Şairler ve Yazarlar Kitabı (The Book of Young Poets and Writers, 1995)
- "Bağbozumları-Kültür, Politika ve Gündelik Hayat Üzerine" ("Vintages, Culture, Politics and Daily Life", with Rahmi G. Öğdül, 2002)
- Post-Anarchism: A Reader (2011, co-editor) (full text) ISBN 9781552664339
- Buluntu Kitap (2017)

== See also ==
- Cemal Süreya
