= Food and agriculture in Nazi Germany =

Food and agriculture in Nazi Germany describes the food and agricultural policies and their consequences from 1933 when the Nazis took power until 1945 when Germany was defeated in World War II (1939–1945) by the allied nations. Starvation and its associated illnesses killed about 20 million people in Europe and Asia during World War II, approximately the same as the number of soldiers killed in battle. Most of the deaths from starvation in Europe were in the Soviet Union and Poland, countries invaded by Germany and occupied in whole or part during the war.

A central focus of Germany's war policy was overcoming chronic food deficits by conquering Poland and the fertile chernozem, or "black soil," region of Ukraine and neighboring republics of the Soviet Union, and expelling, starving, or killing the native populations. German farmers were to be resettled on the vacated lands, thus assuring Germany self-sufficiency in food and enabling Germany to take a secure place alongside the United Kingdom and the United States as a world power. As it worked out, Poland and Ukraine became only minor contributors of food to the civilian population of Germany, as more food came from western European countries such as France and Denmark. To maintain domestic agricultural production while millions of men were serving in the military, Germany imported millions of workers as forced labor.

The German state managed to keep its population reasonably well-nourished until at least autumn 1944, but at the cost of killing or starving to death millions of non-Germans.

== Before World War II ==
In the 19th century agriculture in Germany faced a problem of growing enough food for an increasing population. With competition from imports of inexpensive wheat from North America in the 1870s, Otto von Bismarck adopted a protectionist policy, subsidizing German agriculture by imposing high tariffs on imported food. Agricultural self-sufficiency was seen as an important component of national security. In 1891, German Chancellor Leo von Caprivi said "In a future war feeding the army and the country will play a decisive role." Despite this emphasis on agricultural self-sufficiency, Germany entered World War I in 1914 as a substantial importer of food and fodder. The Allied blockade and trade embargoes exacerbated shortages. By the end of the war in 1918, the German Empire's urban population was starving. 763,000 people were estimated to have died from malnutrition and the incidence of many serious diseases increased. The loss of 13 percent of its territory, including agricultural land, under the Versailles Treaty, increased the difficulties of Germany becoming self-sufficient in food.

During the interwar period (1918–1939), Germany isolated itself from the world market for food, attempting to become self-sufficient. Under the Weimar Republic agricultural workers shifted to the right wing as the left-wing Social Democratic Party and Communist Party failed to craft popular agrarian policies. They shifted to far-right parties such as the Nazi Party after mainstream conservatives failed to respond to the crash of commodity prices in the 1920s. Farming lobbyists demanded protectionist trade policies, including quotas on agricultural imports to Germany. In 1931 Chancellors Heinrich Brüning, Franz von Papen, and Kurt von Schleicher used Article 48 emergency powers to decree foreign exchange rationing and import controls, but refused to implement quotas. Farming lobbyists helped convince President Paul von Hindenburg, a Junker with a large estate in East Prussia, to appoint Adolf Hitler as chancellor in a coalition with the German National People's Party in 1933.

Nazi organization of the agricultural sector of the economy achieved modest successes in the 1930s. When the Nazis took power in 1933, Richard Walther Darré became Reich Minister of Food and Agriculture. Nazi Germany was 80 percent self-sufficient in basic crops such as grains, potatoes, meat, and sugar. In 1939, Germany had become 83 percent self-sufficient in basic crops. An annual Reich Harvest Thanksgiving Festival celebrated and promoted production.

The Nazi government also took measures to achieve "nutritional freedom" by discouraging the population's consumption of foods such as white bread, meat, and butter and centering the German diets on brown bread and potatoes. Consuming imports such as coffee and oranges were discouraged. Two nutritional innovations promoted by the Nazis were quark, a milk product formerly used as animal feed, and eintopf, a one-pot casserole of leftovers eaten the first Monday of every month. The nutrition policies, plus the rigors of the worldwide Great Depression, resulted in a decline in consumption of 17 percent for meat, 21 percent for milk, and 46 percent for eggs between 1927 and 1937. The dietary austerity encouraged by the Nazis resulted in a "continuous and chronic state of undernourishment" for some Germans, especially the urban poor.

== Lebensraum ==
For Hitler the decisive factors in world history were not labour and industry, but struggle for the limited means of sustenance...What the German people needed to secure a decent standard of living was "living space," Lebensraum, and this could only be achieved by warlike conquest.

— Economic historian Adam Tooze, 2007

In February 1939, Nazi leader Adolf Hitler told a group of Wehrmacht officers that food was the most important problem facing Germany. The solution proposed to alleviate Germany's dependence on food imports was to create more Lebensraum (living space) for the German people by conquest and colonization. The Nazis did not create the concept of Lebensraum but adopted it as a central element of their racial and economic objectives.

Germany indeed had a shortage of arable land. In 1937, farmers in Germany tilled an average of 2.1 hectares (5.2 acres) each compared to 2.8 hectares (6.9 acres) for each French farmer, 3.8 hectares (9.4 acres) for each British farmer, and a munificent 12.8 hectares (32 acres) for each American farmer. Moreover, German agriculture was backward with too many small or inefficient farms and agricultural workers. Farmers and agricultural workers made up 26 percent of Germany's labor force in 1939. (compared to about 17 percent of the U.S. labor force in the same year which produced a large surplus of food.)

The Reichsnährstand (Reich Food Corporation), an all-embracing government entity created in 1933 to promote agriculture, said that Germany needed 7 to 8 million hectares, about 75,000 square kilometres (29,000 sq mi), of additional farm land to achieve self-sufficiency in food, insulate Germany from the food shortages that contributed to its defeat in World War I, and enable Germany to match the United Kingdom and the United States in power and influence. To obtain additional farmland, achieve self-sufficiency, and resettle some of its farmers, Germany looked eastward and the conquest of Poland and Ukraine which was part of the Soviet Union at that time. Ukraine, in particular, was of interest to the Germans because of the extremely fertile "black soils" (chernozems) of about one half of its land area.

Germany and the Soviet Union invaded and occupied Poland in September 1939. Germany began planning an invasion of the Soviet Union in July 1940 and invaded the country in June 1941.

== World War II ==
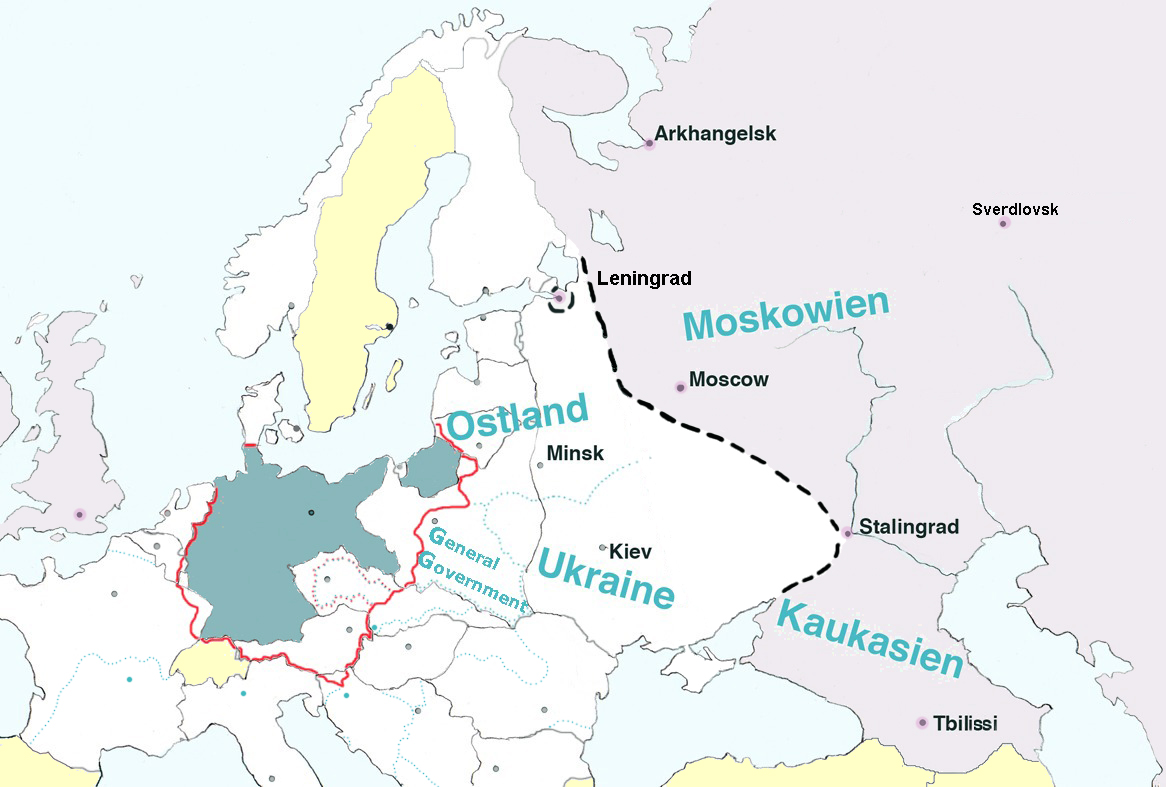
German-inspired map with Nazi-specified borders, 1942. Gray-green shade, prewar Germany; inside red lines, area annexed to Germany; white area, German control and German allies; yellow, neutral countries

=== German policy in Poland ===
After the invasion of Poland, the former Second Polish Republic was divided into three roughly equal zones. The western part of Poland was annexed by Germany and the eastern part was annexed by the Soviet Union. Between these two zones was the General Government, controlled, but not annexed, by Germany. In the annexed part of Poland, the German objective was to replace the Polish population with ethnic German farmers, deporting most of the Polish population further east to the General Government, but retaining some Poles as serfs on German farms. The annexed area had a population of 8,530,000 people (including about 1 million Polish Jews) and the Germans hoped to replace most of them with 530,000 ethnic Germans who had been repatriated from Eastern Europe in 1939 and 1940. In reality, the plan for massive population transfers and resettlement of Germans on Polish farms fell far short of its goals. Only 180,000 Germans were resettled on formerly Polish farms and by the end of 1940 only 305,000 Poles had been deported to the General Government. Instead millions of Poles were conscripted to work on German farms. The colonization by Germans of Polish farms had little favorable impact toward achieving German self-sufficiency in food production. With the German invasion of the Soviet Union in June 1941, the General Government area also became an areas for German resettlement and some of its native population of Poles were deported eastward into the Soviet Union.

=== The Hunger Plan ===
Conquests are really valuable only where the conquered land can be colonized by German peasants and tilled, with limited exceptions, exclusively by Germans...Our past teaches us that the plow must follow the sword.

— Reich Ministry of Food and Agriculture, 1940

For Hitler, the economic prize sought in the German conquest of Central and Eastern Europe was the rich farmlands of Ukraine. The Hunger Plan was developed by Herbert Backe, an agronomist and SS officer, in late 1940 and early 1941 as part of the preparation for the German invasion of the Soviet Union. The Ukrainian Soviet Socialist Republic was the breadbasket of the Soviet Union, and Backe envisioned that its grain production, mostly wheat and oilseeds, would be diverted to Germany. The consequence, according to the plan, would be the death by starvation of 20 to 30 million people. The German Army invading the Soviet Union would live off the land, "forbidden on pain of death to give a Russian even a piece of bread." Once the Soviet Union was defeated, German farmers would take over the land of dispossessed (and likely dead) Ukrainians. Thus, a permanent and secure food supply would be ensured for Germany. Although millions of Soviet citizens starved during World War II, the Hunger Plan was never fully implemented, and by 1943, ethnic Germans were fleeing eastern Europe – not for the purpose of settling on Polish or Ukrainian farms, but rather to escape the advancing Soviet army.

The expectations of Germany for obtaining mountains of grain from Ukraine were never met. The Red Army in retreating from the German army followed a scorched earth strategy. In 1942 and 1943, the two years in which Germany controlled most of Ukraine, the total amount of Ukrainian grain obtained by Germany, including grain for feeding the German army in the Soviet Union, supplemented German domestic production of grain by only 14 percent.

=== Farm labor ===
An estimated 13.6 million soldiers, including a few women, served in the Wehrmacht, the German military forces, during World War II—drawn from a German population of about 80 million. 4.3 million were killed during the war.

The heavy military demand for manpower caused severe shortages of labor in Germany for both industry and agriculture. To meet the demand for labor, Germany by 1943 had imported more than 7 million workers from other European countries, many of them forced labor. These additional people had to eat and Germany set up a system of providing generous rations to the military, an adequate diet for the German population, and a near-starvation diet for the foreign workers. Imports of workers for agricultural work began as early as September 1939 when 100,000 Polish prisoners of war were transported to German farms to dig potatoes. By autumn 1941, 1.1 million Poles and Ukrainians, half of them women, were working on German farms as were 1.2 million prisoners of war, mostly Russians and French. The forced labor of imported workers was responsible for about 20 percent of the food production in Germany during the war.

=== Requisitioning food ===
If anyone has to go hungry, it shall not be the Germans but other peoples.

— Hermann Goering

Despite the emphasis on exploiting the agricultural production of Poland and Ukraine and achieving self-sufficiency from domestic production, Germany also imported (or forcibly requisitioned) substantial quantities of food from other countries. In order of the value of their exports from 1939 to 1944, the most important countries exporting food to Germany were (1) southeastern Europe (Bulgaria, Greece, Hungary, Yugoslavia, Romania, and Turkey); (2) Denmark; (3) Italy: (4) France; (5) Netherlands; and (6) Soviet Union (mostly Ukraine). Polish agricultural production from the area annexed by Germany is not included in this total, and most of Polish production in the non-annexed area of the General Government was used to feed the German army. Likewise, the large amounts of food requisitioned in Ukraine and other republics of the Soviet Union to feed the German army are not included in this valuation.

There seems a reverse correlation between the repression of the Germans and the amount of food they were able to obtain from other countries. The small country of Denmark, where the German hand was relatively light, exported large quantities of food to Germany (mostly beef, pork, and butter), while much-larger Ukraine, under a heavy hand, did not fulfill German expectations that it would be a major source of food for the civilian population of Germany. Author Collingham asserts, "The German occupiers would have had a better chance of squeezing more food out of western Europe if they had invested in restructuring agriculture, rather than concentrating on plunder." German confiscation of food in Greece led to the worst famine in western and southern Europe. Half a million Greeks are estimated to have died of starvation during the war.

=== Rationing and nutrition ===
Breakfast and supper at our house usually consisted of bread and marmalade or evil-tasting margarine. Dinners were monotonous. Most days we had Eintopf, a casserole of potatoes and various vegetables boiled in bouillon and thickened with flour.

— Ursula Mahlendorf, a child living in Nazi Germany

Until late 1944 and early 1945 when American and British military advances in the west and Soviet advances in the east cut Germany off from its non-domestic food sources, the German civilian population received an average of 2,500 calories daily with supplements for people engaged in hard labor and pregnant women. Foreign workers received less food as did "useless mouths" such as prison and concentration camp inmates.
