= Steven T. Byington =

American anarchist (1869–1957)

- Born: December 10, 1869; Westford
- Died: October 12, 1957
- Education: University of Vermont
- Occupation: Bible translator
- Notable work: The Bible in Living English

Steven Tracy Byington (birthname Stephen) (December 10, 1869 – October 12, 1957) was an American individualist anarchist intellectual and translator.

== Life ==
He was born in Westford, Vermont, and later moved to Ballardvale section of Andover, Massachusetts. A one-time proponent of Georgist minarchism, he converted to individualist anarchism after associating with Benjamin Tucker. He was a firm believer in the promotion of individualist anarchism through education. He said "Anarchism has undertaken to change men's minds in one point by removing their faith in force" (Quasi-Invasion and the Boycott in Liberty, X, 2). He began a "Letter Writing Corps" in 1894 which targeted specific individuals, including newspapers, to familiarize others with the philosophical doctrine. He is known for translating two important anarchist works into English from German: Max Stirner's The Ego and Its Own and Paul Eltzbacher's Anarchism; exponents of the anarchist philosophy (also published by Dover with the title The Great Anarchists: Ideas and Teachings of Seven Major Thinkers).

Byington was a cum laude graduate of the University of Vermont in 1891 and a member of the prestigious Phi Beta Kappa. He was considered a master of at least twelve languages, including classical languages. Paul specifically mentions his "some ability" in Arabic and Zulu, plus European languages. His writings included observations on new forms and changed usage of English words, publishing 25 articles in the journal American Speech from 1926 to 1946. However, he had a "handicap of speech" which made preaching difficult so despite his seminary training, he spent many years working as a proofreader.

Over the course of sixty years he translated the Bible from original texts and entitled it The Bible in Living English. It was published posthumously in 1972 in New York by the Watchtower Bible and Tract Society. He published a review of the New World Translation of the Christian Greek Scriptures, the English translation usually associated with Jehovah's Witnesses, in The Christian Century magazine, November 1, 1950, in which he indicated the translation was "well supplied with faults and merits," and that "the book does not give enjoyable continuous reading; but if you are digging for excellent or suggestive renderings, this is among the richer mines"

== See also ==
- Christian anarchism
- Egoist anarchism

== Works online ==
- "An Introduction to the Book of James," Liberty XIV.15 (November 1903). 4–5.
- "That Article on Laws," Liberty XIV.21 (June, 1904). 4.
- Libertarian Labyrinth: a small collection of his works
- Works by Steven T. Byington at Project Gutenberg
- Works by Steven T. Byington at LibriVox (public domain audiobooks)
- Works by or about Steven T. Byington at the Internet Archive
