= Blockade of Germany =

Blockade of Germany may refer to:

- Blockade of Germany (1914–1919) during World War I
- Blockade of Germany (1939–1945) during World War II
