= Great Famine of Mount Lebanon =

1915–1918 famine in Mount Lebanon area

Great Famine of Mount Lebanon مجاعة جبل لبنان
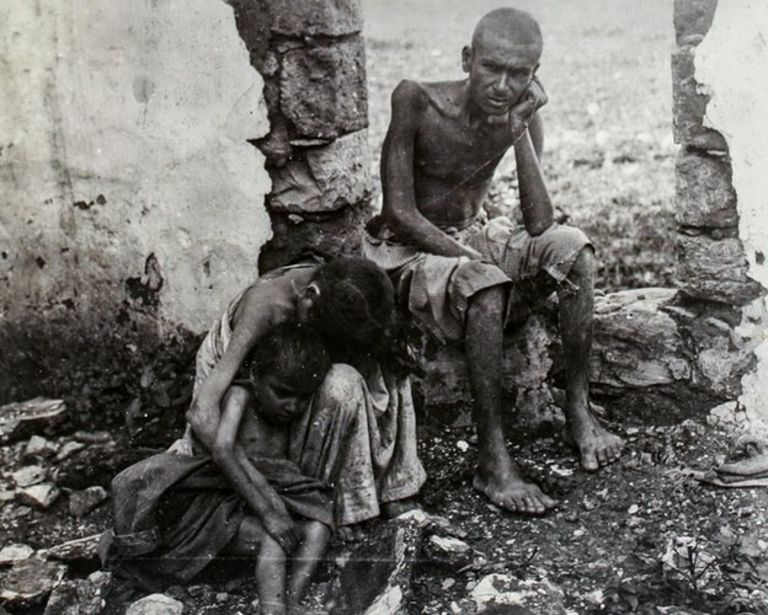
- Starving man and children in Mount Lebanon
- Location: Mount Lebanon Mutasarrifate, Ottoman Empire, modern-day Lebanon
- Period: 1915–1918
- Total deaths: Est. 200,000
- Effect on demographics: Population of 400,000 declined by 50%

The Great Famine of Mount Lebanon (Arabic: مجاعة جبل لبنان, romanized: Majā'at Jabal Lubnān; Ottoman Turkish: Cebel-i Lübnan Kıtlığı جَبَلِ لُبْنَان قِیتْلِیࢰِی), also known as Kafno (Classical Syriac: ܟܦܢܐ, romanized: Kafno, lit. 'Starvation'), was a period of mass starvation on Mount Lebanon during World War I – between 1915 and 1918 – that resulted in the deaths of about 200,000 people, most of whom were Maronite Christians.

There were many reasons for the famine in Mount Lebanon. Natural as well as man-made factors both played a role. Allied forces (Great Britain and France) blockaded the Eastern Mediterranean, as they had done with the German Empire and Austro-Hungarian Empire in Europe, in order to strangle the economy and weaken the Ottoman war effort. The situation was exacerbated by Jamal Pasha, commander of the Fourth Army of the Ottoman Empire, who deliberately barred crops from neighbouring Syria from entering Mount Lebanon, in response to the Allied blockade. Additionally, a swarm of locusts devoured the remaining crops, creating a famine that led to the deaths of half of the population of the Mount Lebanon Mutasarrifate, a semi-autonomous subdivision of the Ottoman Empire and the precursor of modern-day Lebanon. Ottoman Mount Lebanon had the highest per capita fatality rate of any 'bounded' territory during the First World War.

Other areas in modern-day Lebanon, according to multiple sources, were also famine-stricken. However, due to poor documentation, casualties were never recorded. Some of the areas hit with no documentation include Tyre, Zahle, Akkar and Bint Jbeil.

== Background ==
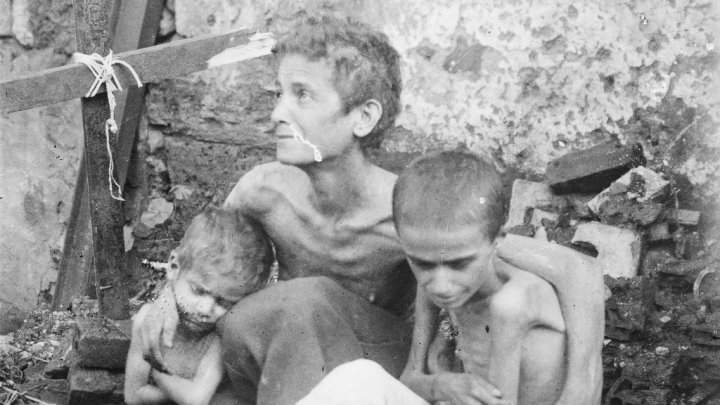
Starving family in Mount Lebanon.

Mount Lebanon Mutasarrifate was one of four entities in Greater Syria or 'Bilad al-Asham' under Ottoman control, including the Damascus, Aleppo, and Beirut Vilayets. Mount Lebanon's economy relied heavily on sericulture; raw silk was processed in looms and finished goods were shipped to the European market and to Damascene manufacturers. While sericulture constituted 32.9% of Mount Lebanon's income in 1914, 45.6% of the region's economy was dependent on remittances from the diaspora in the Americas, making them the 'largest' source of income by the onset of the war.

=== Causes ===
Famine is not characterised by a dearth of food but rather by the inability of people to access it. Multiple factors compounded to create an environment that worsened the pre-existing food shortages caused by the First World War.

==== Pressure ====
Pressure within a community occurs when external factors weaken ongoing food shortages. The impact of WWI acted as the primary example of pressure in Mount Lebanon: the Ottoman war effort that prioritised food for soldiers on the front lines when the Empire neared collapse and the Entente naval blockade impacted the economy.

The movement of Ottoman troops to the front following the 1915 Suez Canal campaign caused a 'bottleneck' in the transportation system of Greater Syria. While there was ample grain and wheat in Damascus, moving it to the mountainous region of Mount Lebanon when the price of hiring a railway carriage had tripled became almost impossible. The Ottoman requisition of transport animals further plagued any efforts at moving aid to the mountainous region.

==== Hold ====
The 'hold' in a famine system applies when something keeps or 'holds' pressure in place for a prolonged period without release.

The region's ability to export silk, a backbone of the economy, to European countries such as France was inhibited as a result of Ottoman military alliances and the subsequent Entente Blockade. The Ottoman alliance with the Central Powers caused the Entente Powers to block international trade routes in order to hinder Ottoman supply; see Blockade of the Eastern Mediterranean. This made the transportation of remittances into the region increasingly difficult, and was worsened by the congestion of land-based transport. The region's dependence on income from external sources reduced local purchasing power and drove the price of food up as it became more scarce. Low rainfall and record-breaking locust infestations laid waste to the remaining crops, which further exacerbated the situation and put increasing pressure on already limited food supplies.

Growing crops was already a challenge in the mountainous region, and the inhabitants relied on food imports from the adjacent Bekaa Valley and Syria. To counter the Allied Blockade, the Ottomans adopted a severe policy of acquisition by which all food supplies were prioritised for the army. Jamal Pasha, commander of the Fourth Army of the Ottoman Empire in Syria, barred crops from entering Mount Lebanon.

==== Self-reinforcing dynamics ====
The inability to access already-diminished food supplies was further exacerbated by a black market run by well-connected usurers. The black market for grain arose as a representation of self-reinforcing dynamics, perpetuated by humans in response to the food crisis. Merchants often 'strategically withheld' their grain and wheat supplies from the market for weeks at a time in order to raise the price and then flood the market. While the Beirut municipality implemented solutions to the illegal trade, they were ultimately unsuccessful.

The politicisation of aid was another self-reinforcing dynamic. In urban areas such as Beirut, the American University of Beirut (formerly known as the Syrian Protestant College or SPC) distributed aid to locals on conditions of religious and moral 'worthiness'. US aid was sent via boat, the USS Caesar or 'Christmas ship' to modern-day Lebanon in an agreed break of the Entente blockade. However, it was stopped at Jaffa Port and the aid never reached Mount Lebanon, where it was to be transferred upon arrival at the port in Beirut. Self-reinforcing dynamics went so far that cannibalism became a common phenomenon, particularly amongst parents who ate their children.

The above mechanisms contributed to the worsening food insecurity and culminated in the outbreak of famine.

==== Collapse and re-balancing ====
Re-balancing occurs when one or more aspects of the system collapse which allows for the stabilisation of food supply, in turn ending the famine.

The end of the famine in Mount Lebanon coincided most notably with the end of the First World War in 1918, the collapse of the Ottoman Empire and the subsequent arrival of French and British forces into the region. However, the situation did not 'normalise' until the following year.

For this reason, the creation of Greater Lebanon or 'Le grand Lebanon' under the administration of France was objectively paradoxical:

''In that sense, the transition between Ottoman and French rule in Lebanon hinged on the ability of the French Empire to enforce a blockade for the duration of the war, and then arrive to relieve the famine its navy had helped create, with ships laden with grain.''

== First grain shortages ==
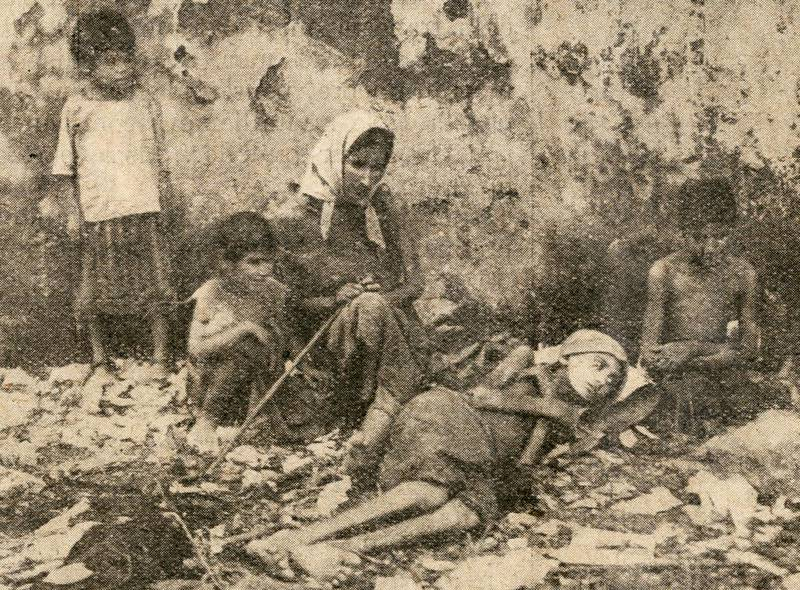
Starving family in Mount Lebanon.

The Ottoman Empire joined the Central Powers in World War I on 28 October 1914. The Ottoman government had appropriated all of the empire's railway services for military use, which disrupted the procurement of crops to parts of the empire. One of the first cities to be hit by the grain shortage was Beirut. On 13 November 1914, only 2 weeks after the Ottoman Empire joined the war, a group of citizens stormed the Beirut municipality to warn the municipal council of the severe shortage of wheat and flour in the city. The train freight cars that regularly transported grains from Aleppo had not arrived and the bakery shelves were empty. Angry mobs looted the bakeries of whatever little reserves of flour and grain they had left. The municipal council dispatched a message to then Beirut Vali Bekir Sami Kunduh who requested grain provisions from the governor of Aleppo Vilayet and urged the Ottoman authorities to prioritize grain shipping to Beirut. Acquiring train freight cars to transport anything to the Beirut Vilayet was impossible without paying large bribes to military commanders and to the railroad authorities. Grain prices began to soar, which prompted the president of Beirut's municipal body, Ahmad Mukhtar Beyhum, to address the grain supply bottlenecks himself.

On 14 November 1914, Beyhum took off to Aleppo, where he negotiated with authorities, securing grain freight cars from the Ottoman Fourth Army. The wheat was paid for from the municipal treasury. Grain freights arrived to Beirut on 19 November 1914 to the relief of the masses; however, the crisis was to worsen as both reports of the Ottoman officials and correspondence from the Syrian Protestant College indicated that food shortages were to become a daily occurrence past November.

== Impact ==
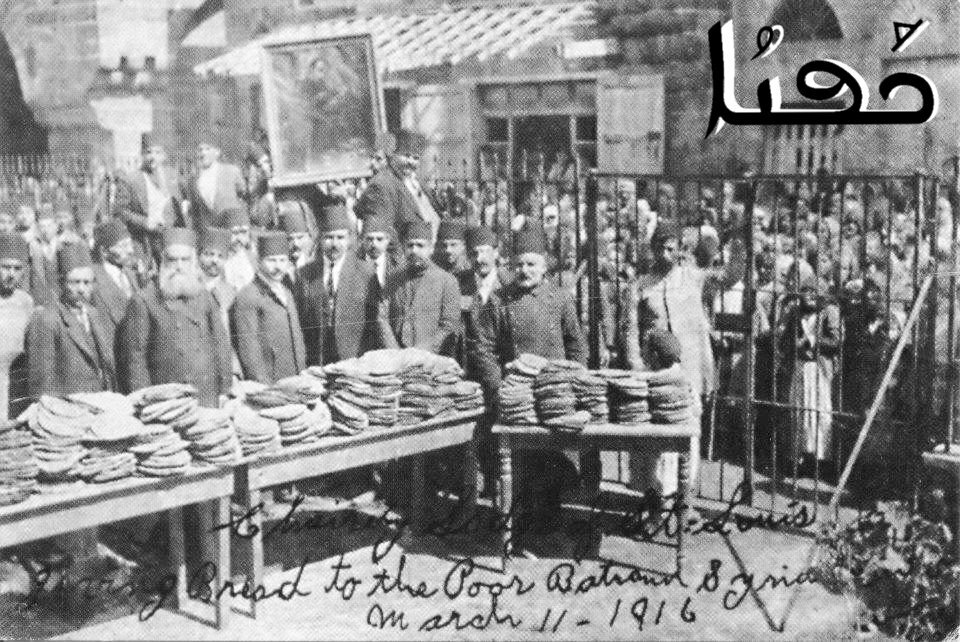
Maronite Patriarch Elias Peter Hoayek distributing bread from Egypt to the hungry

Malnutrition and starvation left the inhabitants vulnerable to the spread of disease at a time of societal upheaval. Malaria, typhus and body lice became widespread amongst a population which grew increasingly susceptible to such illnesses. This was worsened by the movement of troops across the country, who were at greater risk of dying from disease than battle wounds.

Around 200,000 people starved to death at a time when the population of Mount Lebanon was estimated to be 400,000 people. The Mount Lebanon famine caused one of the highest fatality rates by civilian population during World War I, alongside the ethnically and religiously motivated Armenian genocide, Assyrian genocide and the Greek genocide of indigenous Christian peoples in Anatolia, Upper Mesopotamia and the Urmia region of Iran, conducted by the Ottoman Empire and allied Kurdish militias. Bodies were piled in the streets and people were reported to be eating street animals. Some people were said to have resorted to cannibalism.

Soup kitchens were set up but had little effect in relieving the starving population. The Lebanese community in Egypt funded the shipping of food supplies to the Lebanese mainland through Arwad. This assistance was delivered to the Maronite patriarchate who distributed it to the populace through its convents. Despite these conditions, the Maronite Patriarch Elias Peter Hoayek welcomed Armenian refugees fleeing the Armenian genocide into Mount Lebanon, greeting them affectionately by stating "The piece of bread that we have, we will share it with our Armenian brothers."

The Syrian–Mount Lebanon Relief Committee was "formed in June of 1916 under the chairmanship of Najib Maalouf and the Assistant Chairmanship of Ameen Rihani" in the United States.

== Literary references ==
On 26 May 1916, Gibran Khalil Gibran wrote a letter to Mary Haskell that reads: "The famine in Mount Lebanon has been planned and instigated by the Turkish government. Already 80,000 have succumbed to starvation and thousands are dying every single day. The same process happened with the Christian Armenians and applied to the Christians in Mount Lebanon." Gibran dedicated a poem named "Dead Are My People" to the fallen of the famine.

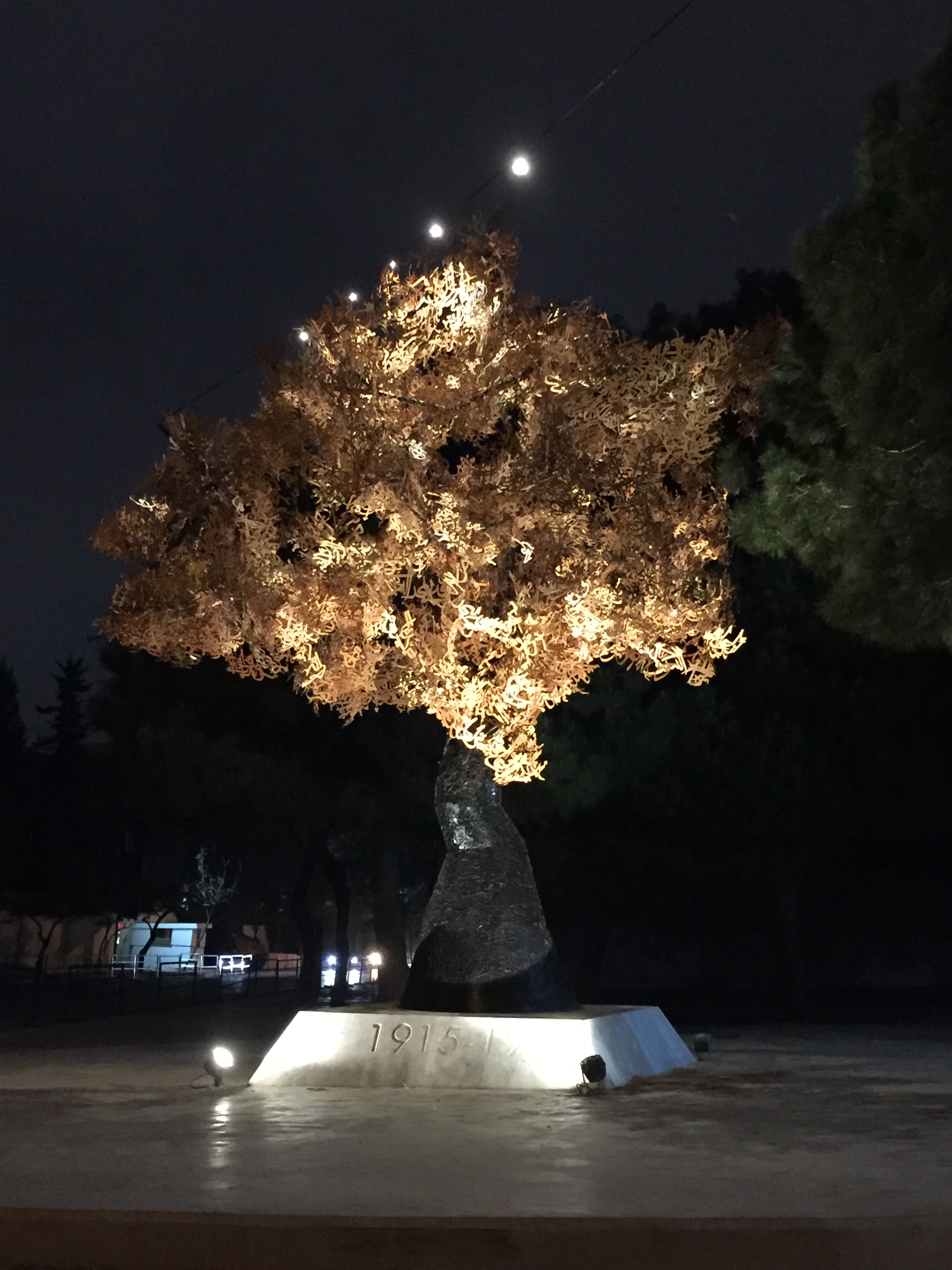
The Great Famine Memorial in Beirut

Tawfiq Yusuf 'Awwad's landmark full-length novel Al-Raghif (The loaf) is set in the impoverished mountain village of Saqiyat al-Misk during World War I. In the novel, 'Awwad describes scenes from the great famine.

There was a woman, lying on her back, covered with lice. An infant with huge eyes was hanging to her naked breast. One of the men pushed her with his foot and waited... Tom bit his fingers and stepped forward. The woman’s head was tipped back and her hair was sparse. From her bosom jutted out a scratched and battered breast that the infant kneaded with his tiny hands and squeezed with his lips, then gave up and cried.

— Tawfiq Yusuf 'Awwad, Al-Raghif (1939)

== Recognition as a genocide ==
Despite the Lebanese government, or any other governmental body, not officially recognizing the Great Famine of Mount Lebanon as a genocide, some Maronites have pushed for its recognition as such. The president of the Syriac Maronite Union, Dr. Amine Iskandar, has stated that “We must inform the coming generations about the Kafno Genocide on 24 April because whoever fears telling of being famined and killed, will be famined and killed again and again.”

== Memorials ==
The first memorial to memorialize the victims of the famine was erected in Beirut in 2018, marking the 100th year since the end of the famine. The site is called "The Great Famine Memorial", and is located in front of the Saint-Joseph University It was erected based on initiatives by Lebanese historian Christian Taoutel (curator of the memorial) and Lebanese writer Ramzi Toufic Salame.

== See also ==
- Ottoman Empire in World War I
- Aftermath of World War I
- Turnip Winter

== Bibliography ==
- Linda Schilcher Schatkowski, «The famine of 1915-1918 in greater Syria», in J. Spagnolo (dir.), Problems of the modern Middle East in historical perspective, Essays in honor of Albert Hourani, Ithaca Press, Reading, 1992, 229–258.
- Pitts, Graham Auman. “Make Them Hated in All of the Arab Countries: France, Famine, and the Creation of Lebanon.” Environmental Histories of World War I. Richard P. Tucker, Tait Keller, J.R. McNeill, and Martin Schmid, eds. Cambridge, U.K.: Cambridge University Press (2018)
- Pitts, Graham Auman (2020-09-22). "A Hungry Population Stops Thinking About Resistance: Class, Famine, and Lebanon's World War I Legacy". Journal of the Ottoman and Turkish Studies Association. 7 (2): 217–237. doi:10.2979/jottturstuass.7.2.13. S2CID 235051188.
- al-Qattan, Najwa (November 2014). "When mothers ate their children: Wartime memory and the language of food in Syria and Lebanon". International Journal of Middle East Studies. 46 (4): 719–736. doi:10.1017/S0020743814001032. JSTOR 43303223. S2CID 163058456.
- Yann Bouyrat, « Une crise alimentaire « provoquée » ? La famine au Liban (1915-1918) », Actes des congrès nationaux des sociétés historiques et scientifiques, vol. 138, no 8, 2016, p. 22–37 https://www.persee.fr/doc/acths_1764-7355_2016_act_138_8_2870
- Harris, William (2012). Lebanon: A History, 600–2011. Oxford University Press. pp. 173–179. ISBN 9780195181111.
- Tanielian, Melanie Schulze (November 2014). "Feeding the city: the Beirut municipality and the politics of food during World War I". International Journal of Middle East Studies. 46 (4): 737–758. doi:10.1017/S0020743814001044. JSTOR 43303224. S2CID 153353905.
- Tanielian, Melanie Schulze (2018). Charity of War: Famine, Humanitarian Aid and World War I in the Middle East. Stanford University Press. ISBN 9781503603523.
- Taoutel, Christian; Wittouck, Pierre (2015). Le peuple libanais dans la tourmente de la grande guerre 1914-1918 d'après les Pères Jésuites au Liban (in French). Presses de l'Université Saint-Joseph. ISBN 978-9953455440.
- "Victims of the Great Famine of Mount Lebanon finally have a memorial monument in Beirut". The961. Lebanon: The961.com. 22 July 2018. Archived from the original on 25 December 2019.
