= Syrian–Mount Lebanon Relief Committee =

The Syrian–Mount Lebanon Relief Committee (Arabic: لجنة إعانة المنكوبين في سوريا ولبنان, romanized: lajnat ināʿat al-mankūbīn fī sūriyā wa-lubnān) was an organization "formed in June of 1916 under the chairmanship of Najib Maalouf and the Assistant Chairmanship of Ameen Rihani" in the United States. Kahlil Gibran was its secretary. Its offices were at 55 Broadway, New York. It aimed at working in cooperation with the American Committee for Armenian and Syrian Relief, and raised "some $165,815 in two and a half years from about 15,000 Syrian subscribers in America."

== See also ==
- Great Famine of Mount Lebanon
