= Adolf Tortilowicz von Batocki-Friebe =

German politician (1868–1944)

Adolf von Batocki-Friebe
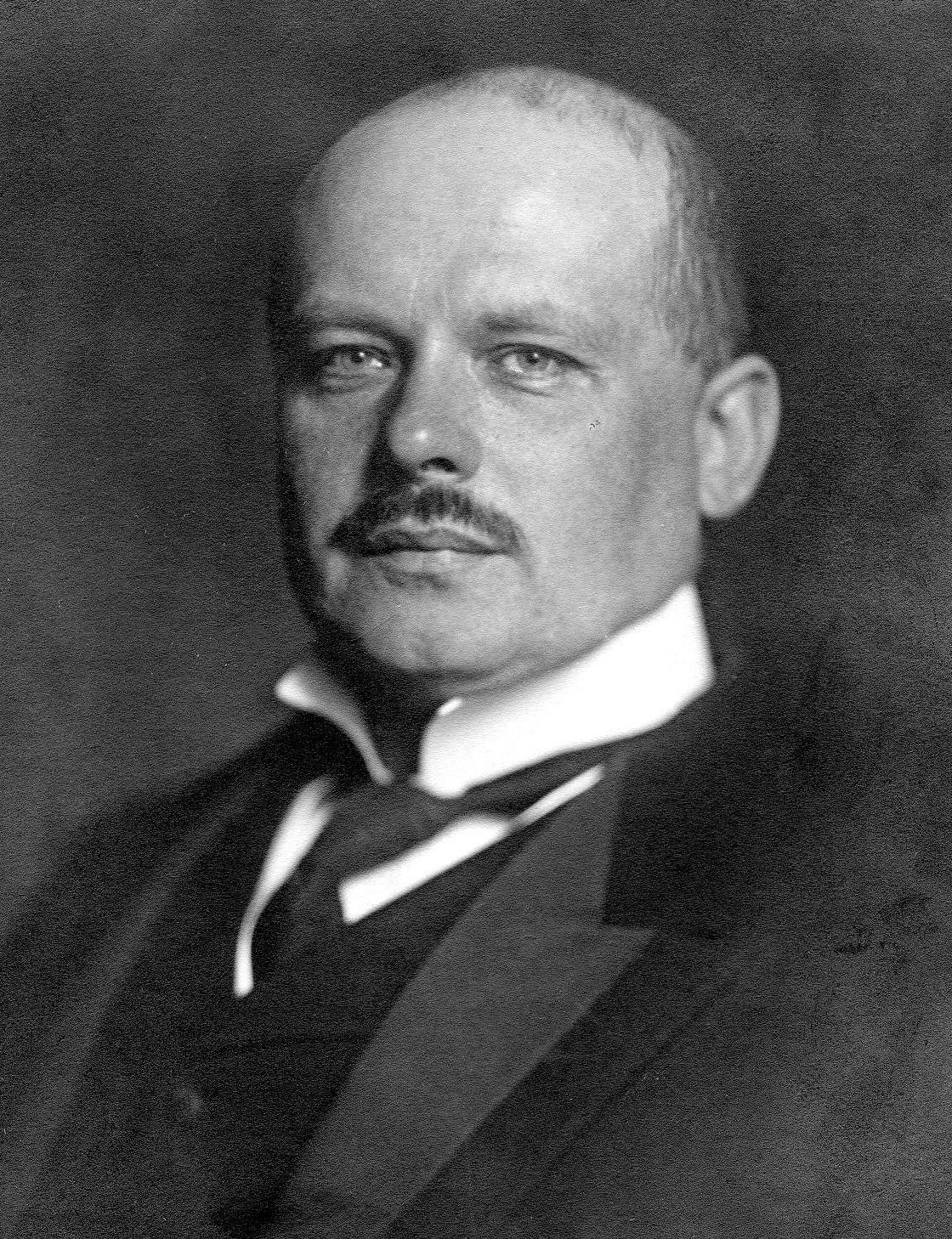
- Adolf von Batocki-Friebe in 1914

Oberpräsident of East Prussia
- In office 1 October 1914 – 1 August 1916
- In office 1 February 1918 – 30 June 1919

President of the War Food Office
- In office 22 May 1916 – 6 August 1917

Prussian House of Lords
- In office 1910–1918

Provincial Parliament of East Prussia
- In office 1919–1921

Personal details
- Born: 31 July 1868 Gut Bledau, Cranz, East Prussia
- Died: 22 May 1944 (aged 75) Gut Wosegau
- Party: German National People's Party
- Spouse: Paula Gräfin von Kalnein
- Occupation: Lawyer
- Awards: Knight of the Order of Saint John (Bailiwick of Brandenburg)

Max Johann Otto Adolf Tortilowicz von Batocki-Friebe, usually known as Adolf von Batocki-Friebe (31 July 1868 – 22 May 1944), was a German noble, lawyer and politician, and belonged to a noble Lithuanian family.

== Early life, education and government service ==
Batocki-Friebe was born at Gut Bledau, Cranz near Königsberg, East Prussia to an aristocratic family. He studied law at the universities of Bonn, Strasbourg and Königsberg. He joined the Prussian civil service as a government Assessor in 1895. He served as the Landrat (district administrator) in the Königsberg Regierungsbezirk from 1900 to 1907 and then became the chairman of the East Prussian Chamber of Agriculture from 1907 to 1914. He sat as a member of the Prussian House of Lords from 1910 to its abolition in 1918.

== First World War roles ==
Batocki-Friebe served as Oberpräsident of the Province of East Prussia for two periods spanning most of the First World War (1 October 1914 – 1 August 1916 and 1 February 1918 – 30 June 1919). The onset of the war led to an initial wave of refugees fleeing those areas that the Imperial German Army felt could not be effectively defended. This led to a humanitarian crisis which the authorities hoped to mitigate by setting up the War Relief Commission (Kriegshilfskommission). At their first plenary held on 12 October 1914, Batocki-Friebe outlined his approach:

"The most difficult work that we face in the East after our final victory will not be the work of restoring the economic damage. It will not be anything that can be achieved with money. It will lie rather in strengthening and firming up our population. Only when that succeeds can East Prussia fulfill its task as a stronghold of Germandom."

After German forces repulsed the Imperial Russian Army's invasion of East Prussia, Batocki-Friebe was instrumental in reconstructing the war damage in the province and was selected as president of the War Food Office, which he headed from 22 May 1916 to 6 August 1917. From there, he served on the Italian front as a major of reserves and was the military governor of Udine until February 1918 when he returned to resume the office of Oberpräsident of East Prussia.

== Post-war life ==
In the Weimar Republic, Batocki-Friebe was elected as a deputy of the provincial parliament of East Prussia from 1919 to 1921 as a member of the conservative German National People's Party. He sat on the board of directors of the Deutsche Reichsbahn and the boards of several corporations. He founded and led the Institute for East German Economics. In 1927, Batocki-Friebe was appointed an honorary professor on the faculty the University of Königsberg and lectured on economics. He spent his later years on his family estate. In the 1932 German presidential election, he publicly campaigned for the re-election of Paul von Hindenburg over Adolf Hitler.

Batocki-Friebe was a Knight of Justice of the Order of Saint John.

== Publications ==
- Ostpreussens Vergangenheit, Gegenwart und Zukunft, 1915.
- Die Preisbildung im Kriege 1916. (with Karl Thieß)
- Ostpreußen in Harren und Krieg, in Sturz und Sieg, 1916. (with Paul Burg)
- Russisch als Pflichtfach an höheren Schulen der Ostprovinzen, 1918. (with Joh Gerschmann)
- Vom Kampfe um das Geschick Ostpreußens, 1919.
- Warenpreis und Geldwert im Kriege, 1919.
- Wie kann die innere Siedlung und Bodenausnutzung schnell und wirksam [...], 1919.
- Umstellung der Landwirtschaft, 1920.
- Ostpreussens wirtschaftliche Lage vor und nach dem Weltkriege, 1920.
- Schluss mit Kriegszwangswirtschaft!, 1921.
- Staatsreferendar und Staatsassessor, 1927. (with Werner Friedrich Bruck, Heinrich von Friedberg)
- Preussen, der Kern der deutschen Verfassungsfrage, 1928.
- Bevölkerung und Wirtschaft in Ostpreussen, 1929. (with Gerhard Schack)
- Bedeutung und Umfang der Meliorationen in Deutschland, 1931.
- Die Bedeutung landwirtschaftlicher Meliorationen in Ostpreussen im Rahmen..., 1933. (with Otto Heinemann, Kurt Stüwe)

== Sources ==
- Acta Borussica, Band 9 (1900–1909) (PDF-Datei; 2,74 MB)
- Acta Borussica, Band 10 (1909–1918) (PDF-Datei; 2,74 MB)
- Batocki-Friebe (eigentlich Tortilowicz von Batocki), Adolf Max Johannes Otto von in the Deutsche Biographie
- Dieter Stüttgen: Die preussische Verwaltung des Regierungsbezirks Gumbinnen, 1871–1920, 1980, S. 38–40.
- Fried von Batocki, Klaus von der Groeben: Adolf von Batocki. Ein Lebensbild. Im Einsatz für Ostpreußen und das Reich. Ostsee-Verlag, Raisdorf 1998.
- Genealogisches Handbuch des Adels, Adelige Häuser B Band XVIII, Seite 484, Band 95 der Gesamtreihe, C. A. Starke Verlag, Limburg (Lahn) 1989, ISSN 0435-2408
