= Blockade of the Eastern Mediterranean =

- Part of World War I
Date	25 August 1915 – 1918
Location	Eastern Mediterranean
Result	Allied victory

Belligerents
United Kingdom; French Republic	Ottoman Empire; German Empire; Austria-Hungary

Units involved
Royal Navy; Marine Nationale	Ottoman Navy

On 25 August 1915, the Allied forces officially declared a blockade of the eastern coast of the Mediterranean. The declared area begins in the north at the intersection of the Aegean Sea and the Mediterranean and ends in the south at the Egyptian frontier. This measure was directed against the Ottoman Empire, which had joined the Central Powers. It had a severe impact on the food supply and needs of the civilian population and prices "sky-rocketed". In contrast to the blockade of Germany, the Anglo-French blockade was not extensively studied.

The British Prime Minister, David Lloyd George justifies the use of the naval blockade as a tool of war:

In a war of this order, sea power was the key to ultimate victory so long as either policy could manage just to hold their own on land. If we maintained control of the seas without actually breaking on shore, the Central Powers could in the end be starved into surrender… Potential famine was therefore the most powerful weapon in the army of belligerents. As long as Britain kept her rule over the waves, neither she nor her Allies could be beaten by any shortage of food or essential material for waging war… It was a ruthless calculation, but war is organized cruelty… The sum total of the agony inflicted on mankind by war was never as great as it proved to be in the World War of 1914-18.

It also directly led to famine in Mount Lebanon and mass migrations. The British believed that the blockade would be effective on the Levantine Sea after persuading Sharif Hussein to revolt against the Ottomans and thus lift the blockade on the Red Sea. The French were less motivated to continue the blockade after news of famine and food shortages, and observed that sending aid would be more effective than a blockade for the Allies.

== See also ==
- Great Famine of Mount Lebanon
