= The Bible in Living English =

1972 biblical translation by Steven T. Byington

- Full name: The Bible in Living English
- Abbreviation: By
- Complete Bible published: 1972
- Authorship: Steven T. Byington
- Copyright: Copyright 1972 Watch Tower Bible and Tract Society of Pennsylvania
- Genesis 1:1–3 At the beginning of God's creating the heavens and the earth the earth was a blank chaos, and there was darkness over the surface of the deep; and God's Spirit was hovering over the surface of the waters. And God said "Let there be light," and there was light. John 3:16 For God so loved the world that he gave his only son that everyone who believes in him might not perish but have eternal life.

The Bible in Living English is a translation of the Bible by Steven T. Byington.

== History ==
Byington translated the Bible on his own for 45 years from 1898 to 1943, but was unable to have it published during his lifetime. After he died in 1957, the Watch Tower Bible and Tract Society acquired the publication rights, but the translation was not published until 1972. US copyright law therefore protected it until 2000; the Copyright Catalog does not list the Watch Tower Society as having applied for a renewal on this publication. The translation may still be in copyright in countries not implementing the rule of the shorter term.

== Use of Jehovah ==
A notable characteristic of this translation was the use of God's name, which Byington translated Jehovah in the Old Testament. Byington states in his preface: “The spelling and the pronunciation are not highly important. What is highly important is to keep it clear that this is a personal name. There are several texts that cannot be properly understood if we translate this name by a common noun like Lord, or, much worse, by a substantivized adjective”.
