= Anarchism (Eltzbacher book) =

1900 book by Paul Eltzbacher

- Title page of first English edition
- Author: Paul Eltzbacher
- Original title: Der Anarchismus
- Translator: Steven T. Byington
- Language: German
- Subject: Anarchism
- Publisher: Guttentag
- Publication date: 1900
- Publication place: Germany
- English publication date: 1908
- Pages: 305 (German 1st ed.); 309 (English 1st ed.)
- OCLC: 1150798
- Original text: Der Anarchismus at HathiTrust
- Translation: Anarchism at HathiTrust

Anarchism is a book-length study of anarchism written by Paul Eltzbacher. It was originally published in 1900 and quickly translated into five languages, including English in 1908 by Steven T. Byington.

== Contents ==
Eltzbacher gives straightforward descriptions of seven major figures in anarchism: Godwin, Proudhon, Stirner, Bakunin, Kropotkin, Tucker, and Tolstoy. He is not a sympathetic critic.

== Publication ==
Originally published in 1900, Eltzbacher's book was quickly translated into Spanish (1901), French (1902), Russian (1903), and Dutch (1903). Steven T. Byington translated the English version for publication by Benjamin Tucker in 1908. The English translation was reprinted in 1960 by the Libertarian Book Club of New York. The reprint's editor preface provides a history of the book's publication and details on the author, translator, and publisher. But it also introduces errors, particularly in the Proudhon section.

== Reception and legacy ==
Eltzbacher's Anarchism was among the most accessible compilations of anarchist writings in the early twentieth century. It was and remains among the most read studies of the subject.

Kropotkin himself, in his 1910 Encyclopædia Britannica article on "Anarchism", commended the book as the best and most fair work on the topic, written with a full knowledge of anarchist literature.

== Bibliography ==
- Bowen, Clarence W., ed. (April 9, 1908). "Literature: Rev. of Anarchism by Eltzbacher". The Independent. 64 (3097). New York: 810.
- Eulenburg, F. (1902). "Review of Der Anarchismus". Historische Zeitschrift. 89 (1): 115–119. ISSN 0018-2613. JSTOR 27600703.
- Flower, B. O., ed. (March 1908). "Books of the Day: Rev. of Anarchism by Eltzbacher". The Arena. 39: 381–382.
- Gide, Ch. (1903). "Review of L'anarchisme". Revue d'économie politique. 17 (2): 182. ISSN 0373-2630. JSTOR 24680153.
- Jones, Chester Lloyd (1908). "Book Department: Rev. of Anarchism by Eltzbacher". Annals of the American Academy of Political and Social Science. 32: 442–443.
- Jun, Nathan J. (2019). "The State". In Levy, Carl; Adams, Matthew S. (eds.). The Palgrave Handbook of Anarchism. Cham: Springer International Publishing. pp. 27–45. doi:10.1007/978-3-319-75620-2_2. ISBN 978-3-319-75619-6. S2CID 242090309.
- Kuhn, Gabriel, ed. (2010). Revolution and Other Writings: A Political Reader. PM Press. ISBN 978-1-60486-054-2.
- P., R. (1923). "Review of L'anarchisme". Revue d'histoire économique et sociale. 11 (2): 222–223. ISSN 0035-239X. JSTOR 24058965.
- Racca, VittIorio (1903). "Review of L'Anarchisme". Giornale degli Economisti. 27 (Anno 14): 95–96. ISSN 1125-2855. JSTOR 23221405.
- Sorel, G. (1902). "Review of L'anarchisme". Revue Philosophique de la France et de l'Étranger. 54: 307–308. ISSN 0035-3833. JSTOR 41077660.
- Weir, David (1997). Anarchy & Culture: The Aesthetic Politics of Modernism. University of Massachusetts Press. ISBN 978-1-55849-084-0.
- More in Wilson, Justina Leavitt; Fanning, Clara Elizabeth, eds. (1908). "Revs. of Anarchism by Eltzbacher". Book Review Digest: 112.
- https://books.google.com/books?id=u_evIt8DtO8C&pg=PA1
- https://books.google.com/books?id=ux-xAMFUY2gC&pg=PA281
- https://books.google.com/books?id=1iUxDwAAQBAJ&pg=PT477
