= Blockade of Germany (1914–1919) =

WWI naval blockade

- Part of Atlantic and Mediterranean naval campaigns of World War I
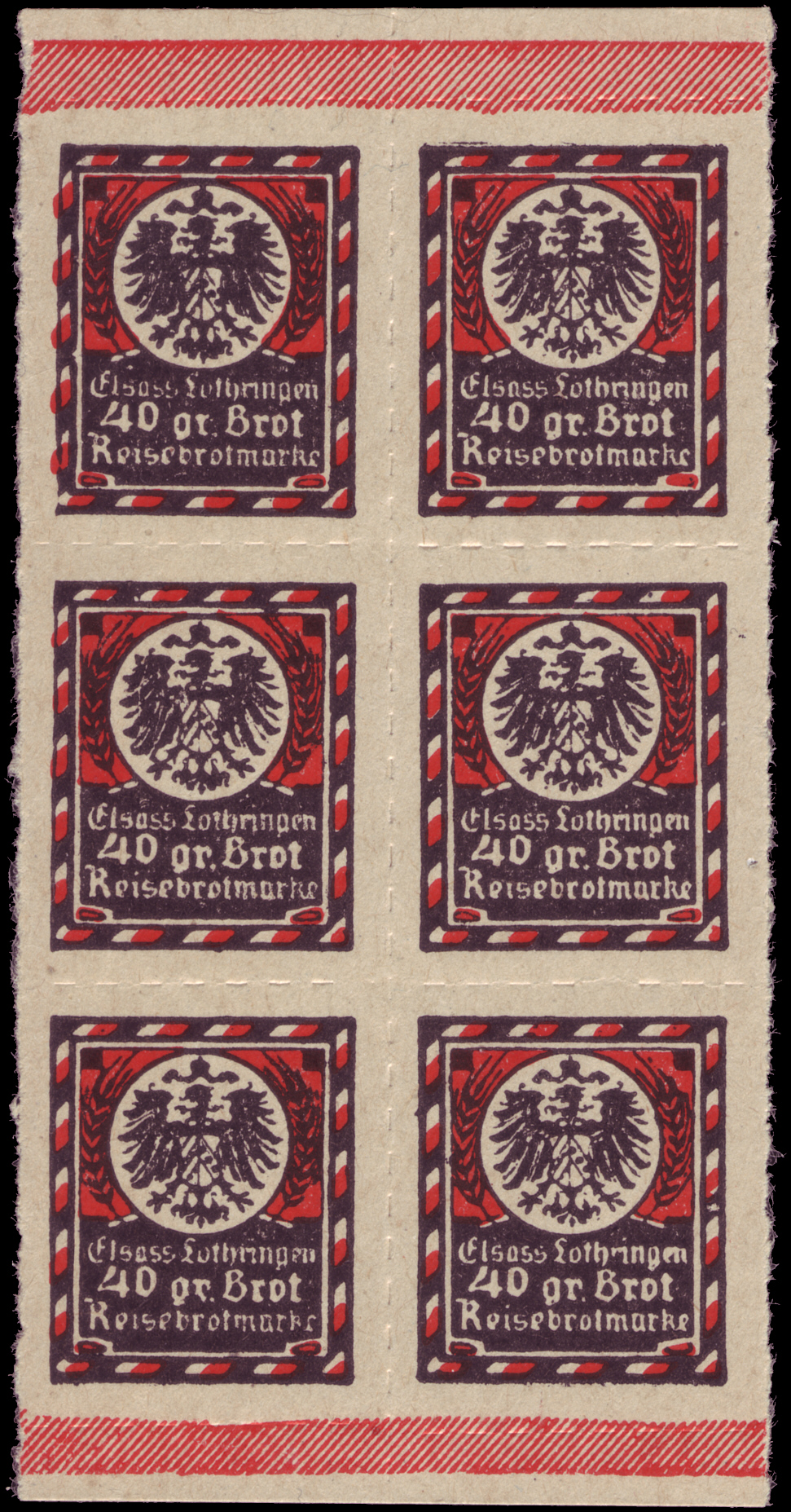
- Bread rationing coupons issued in Alsace-Lorraine during World War I.
Date	1914–1919
Location	Atlantic Ocean, Mediterranean Sea
Result	Allied victory

Belligerents
Allied Powers: British Empire; French Republic; United States (1917–1919)	Central Powers: German Empire; Austria-Hungary; Ottoman Empire; Kingdom of Bulgaria (1915–1918)

Casualties and losses
- ~500,000 civilians dead from excess mortality (excluding flu-pandemic deaths) between 1914 and 1919, 763,000 according to a 1918 German government estimate

The Blockade of Germany, or the Blockade of Europe, occurred from 1914 to 1919. The prolonged naval blockade was conducted by the Entente during and after World War I in an effort to restrict the maritime supply of goods to the Central Powers, which included Germany, Austria-Hungary, and the Ottoman Empire. The blockade greatly contributed to the eventual Allied victory in the war. The restricted supply of strategic materials such as metal ores and oil had a detrimental effect on the Central Powers' war effort, despite ingenious efforts to find other sources or substitutes.

Through a sequence of events, the Allies declared foodstuffs contraband, and this aspect of the blockade remains most controversial. In December 1918, the German Board of Public Health claimed that 763,000 German civilians had already died from starvation and disease caused by the blockade. An academic study done in 1928 put the death toll at 424,000, with similar or lower numbers given by more recent scholars, noting however complications with the degree of attribution of deaths to the Spanish flu of 1918-1920. Around 100,000 people may have died during the post-armistice continuation of the blockade into 1919. However, it has been pointed out that there was an even slightly larger civilian excess mortality during the war in the United Kingdom and France, both countries that were much less affected by food shortages (although this can also be attributed to the influenza epidemic and to diseases such as bronchitis and tuberculosis which are not strictly nutrition-related).

Germany, France and the United Kingdom relied heavily on imports to feed their populations and to supply their war industry. Imports of foodstuffs and war materiel to the European belligerents came primarily from the Americas and had to be shipped across the Atlantic Ocean, which impelled Britain, France and Germany to aim to blockade each other. The British Royal Navy, combined with the French Navy, out-numbered the Central Powers' ships and could operate throughout the British Empire and the French colonial empire, while the German Kaiserliche Marine, its surface fleet mainly restricted to the German Bight, used its commerce raiders and submarines elsewhere. Germany was initially able to use neutral countries as a conduit for international trade, but eventually British and French pressure, American involvement, and German missteps led to the full economic isolation of Germany.

== Background ==
In April 1904, Great Britain and Ireland signed a series of agreements with France to improve their relations (Entente Cordiale). In 1905 and 1906, long before the First World War, a series of conferences took place at Whitehall concerning military co-operation in the event of a war with the German Empire. The Director of Naval Intelligence, Charles Ottley, asserted that two of the Royal Navy's functions in such a war would be the capture of German commercial shipping and the blockade of German ports. A blockade was considered useful for two reasons: it could force the enemy's fleet to fight, and it could act as an economic weapon to destroy German commerce. It was not until 1908, however, that a blockade of Germany formally appeared in the war plans of the Royal Navy, and even then some officials were divided over how feasible it was. The plans remained in a state of constant change and revision until 1914, with the navy undecided over how best to operate such a blockade. A traditional "close blockade" involved warships being stationed directly outside an enemy's ports. By 1912, improvements in naval technology, especially in torpedo boats, mines, coastal artillery, and submarines, had led to fears that blockading ships would be vulnerable. Therefore, by July 1914, the British had decided that in the event of war with Germany, a "distant blockade", controlling entry to the Atlantic Ocean through the North Sea, would be the best strategy.

Meanwhile, the Germans had not made specific plans to manage their wartime food supplies, since in peacetime Germany produced about 80% of its total consumption. They also expected to requisition supplies from occupied territories; furthermore, overland imports from the Netherlands, Scandinavia, and Romania, would be unaffected by any naval blockade. A key component of German military thinking was the realization that notwithstanding food supplies, Germany's prospect of winning a long war with relatively weak allies against the United Kingdom, France and Russia was dubious in any case. The Schlieffen Plan was the product of the cult of the offensive mindset, and had left the General Staff confident that the war would be over (at least in the west) long before food shortages might otherwise have become an issue. However, once it became clear that the Schlieffen Plan had failed and that Germany would have to fight a long war on two fronts, factors such as the conscription of farm laborers, the requisition of horses, poor weather, and the diversion of nitrogen from fertilizer manufacture into military explosives, all combined to cause a considerable drop in agricultural output.

A key factor was the 1909 Declaration of London, which attempted to establish the generally recognized rules of international law. While signed, it was never formally ratified by any country (the US Senate consented to it, but not in time for the start of the war). The British, in particular, did not wholly accept the Declaration, but did not disregard it entirely either.
As well as specifying certain rules on the treatment of neutral ships, the declaration defined three categories of neutral cargo during war:

1. Absolute contraband, which is clearly military cargo that can be seized without notice.
2. Conditional contraband, which is dual purpose goods including foodstuffs. These could be captured if "shown to be destined for the use of the armed forces or of a government department of the enemy state".
3. Goods not to be declared contraband, such as medical supplies, but also certain civilian raw materials and goods.

In the event, the British would "modify" and "supplement" the Declaration in their blockade.

== Blockade ==
The United Kingdom, with its overwhelming sea power, established a naval blockade of Germany immediately on the outbreak of war in August 1914. This was strengthened or weakened in a number of steps.

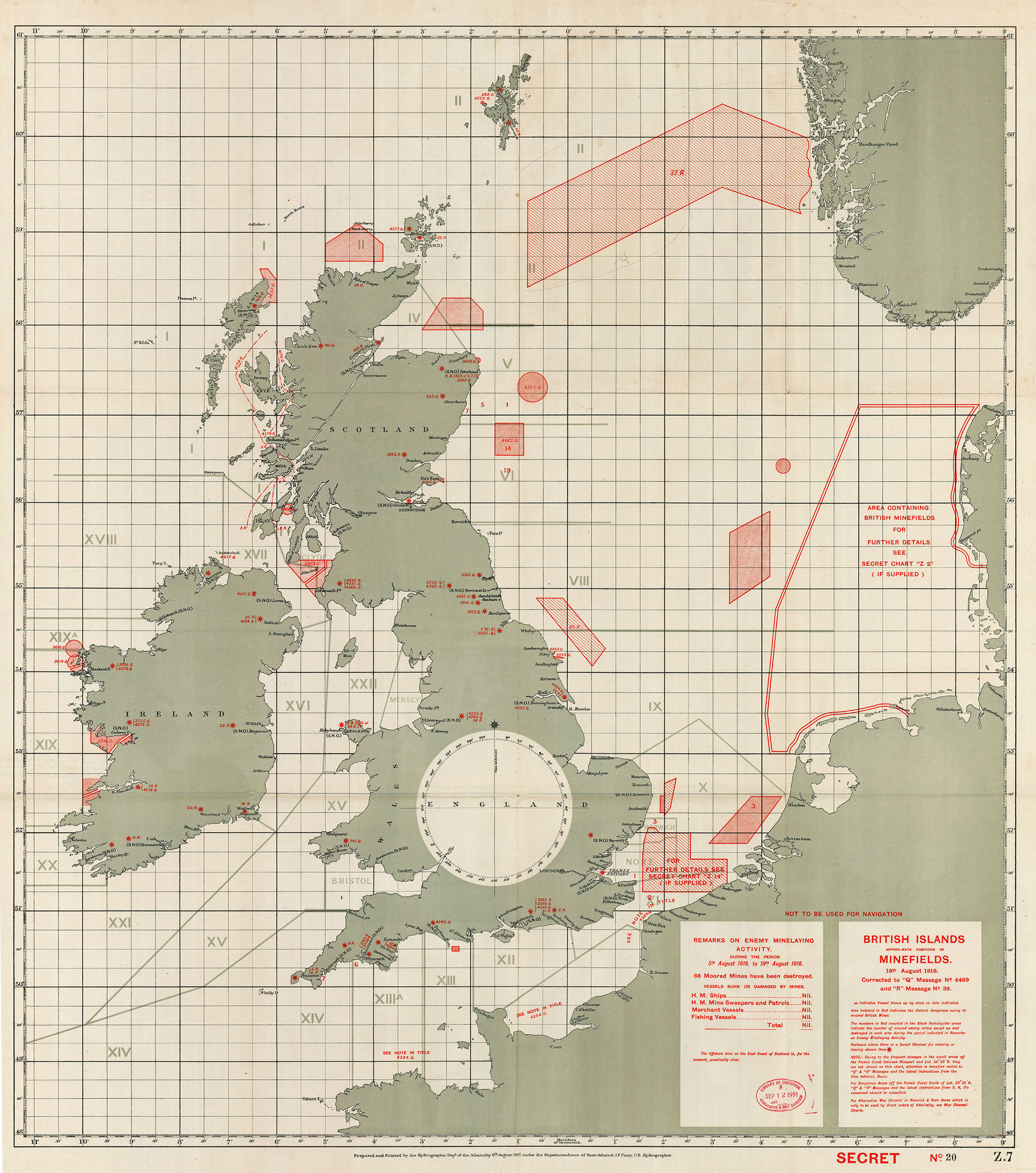
Official Royal Navy map showing approximate positions of naval minefields around the British Isles, 19th August 1918.

1. 20 August 1914, a Maritime Order in Council declared that Conditional Contraband would be treated as Absolute Contraband.
2. 21 September 1914, the Contraband Proclamation reassigned many goods from the "not to be declared contraband" list to the Conditional Contraband list.
3. 29 October 1914, due to American protests, a new Maritime Order in Council repealed the 20 August order, but put the onus on the owners of the goods to prove there was not a military destination.
4. 2 November 1914, accusing Germany of illegally placing naval mines, Britain declared the North Sea a "military area". This meant that to ensure "commerce of all countries will be able to reach its destination in safety", traffic through the area was recommended to follow specific lanes (to avoid German mines and British mines, ostensibly placed to protect against German warships), forcing them to submit to British inspection.
5. 11 March 1915, a Maritime Order in Council announced that the British would "seize all ships carrying goods of presumed enemy destination, ownership, or origin". This was in retaliation for the February 1915 German "war zone" announcement

The last of those measures was also preceded by the case of the SS Wilhelmina (1888), a US-flagged cargo ship carrying American foodstuffs to Hamburg. The owners of the cargo had issued a guarantee that the food would not be used by the German military, which was accepted by the British. However, while the ship was en route, on 26 January 1915, the German Federal Council announced that the German government would seize all grain in Germany, a decree interpreted by the British as putting the food supply all under the control of the German Army. Thus the Wilhelmina was detained in Falmouth, Cornwall from 9 February, while the British, Germans and Americans debated how the decree affected the original assurance. The 11 March Order in Council overtook prize court proceedings which were originally planned for 31 March and the issue was eventually settled in July 1916 by Lord Mersey directing the British Government to purchase the cargo and pay damages to the ship owners, rejecting the Americans' claims of neutral trading rights.

Eventually, it became clear that the British measures all but prevented maritime neutral trade, including foodstuffs, with the Central Powers. While the British avoided the use of the word "blockade" in the above pronouncements, their actions presented an effective "distant blockade", in direct contravention of much of the London Declaration. The British defended their actions by pointing out that they had never ratified the agreement, by arguing that they were retaliating for German actions, by suggesting the Declaration failed to anticipate the military use of some goods (such as rubber), and by referring to the German legal argument that coastal towns could be treated as fortifications and subjected to bombardment. Despite protests, most neutral merchant vessels agreed to dock at British ports to be inspected and then escorted, less any "illegal" cargo destined for Germany, through the British minefields to their destinations.

In March 1916, at the suggestion of Robert Peet Skinner, the United States Consul General in London, the inspection procedure was considerably simplified for neutral shipping. A certified manifest could be sent in advance by telegram to the local British embassy, which, if agreed, could issue a document known as a "navicert", which was forwarded to the Admiralty and would allow the cargo to pass through the blockade without the need for inspection.

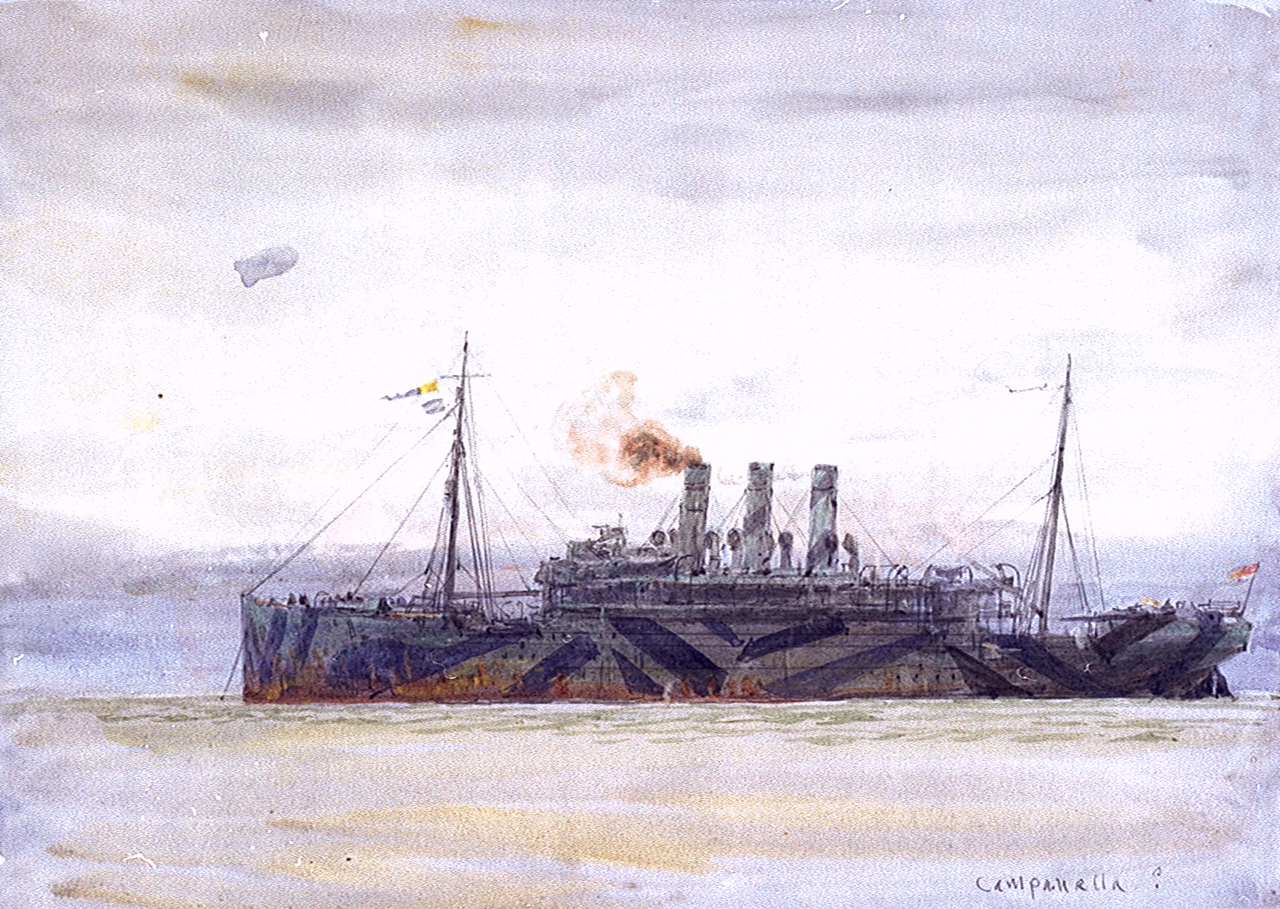
HMS Columbella, one of the armed merchant cruisers of the Northern Patrol.

The British Isles formed what Admiral Beatty described as "a great breakwater across German waters thereby limiting the passage of vessels to the outer seas to two exits". The Dover Patrol closed off the narrow English Channel, while the Northern Patrol closed the North Sea across the 155 miles (249 km) gap between Shetland and Norway, supported by the huge Grand Fleet based at Scapa Flow in Orkney. A British submarine flotilla operated in the Baltic Sea to impede the supply of Swedish iron ore to Germany. A memorandum to the British War Cabinet on 1 January 1917 stated that very few supplies were reaching Germany or its allies via the North Sea or other areas such as Austria-Hungary's Adriatic ports, which had been subject to a French blockade since 1914.

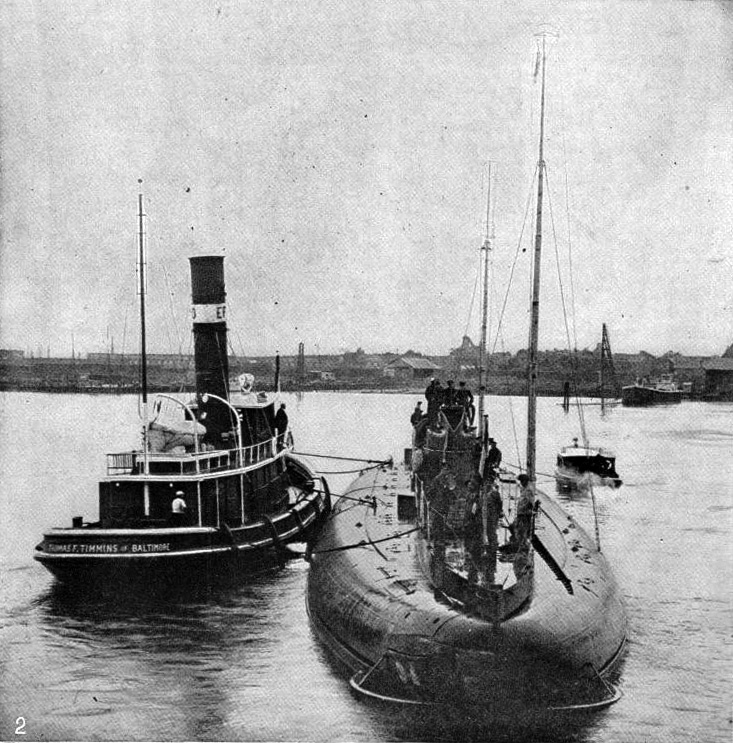
The German blockade-running submarine Deutschland arrives at Baltimore in July 1916.

The German government regarded the blockade as an attempt to starve the country into defeat. Militarily, they attempted to retaliate in kind, in particular through the U-boat campaign. The German High Seas Fleet also set out multiple times from 1914 to 1916 to reduce the British Grand Fleet and regain access to vital imports. The sea conflicts culminated in the indecisive Battle of Jutland in 1916, never succeeding in breaking the blockade.

Some German merchant ships served as blockade runners that were able to elude the Northern Patrol in periods of poor visibility. Neutral shipping was tempted by high prices to smuggle strategic materials such as rubber, cotton or metals, which could be hidden from inspection or listed as personal luggage. Some neutral ships colluded with the Germans in allowing themselves to be arrested in Danish waters. However, the desperation in Germany is illustrated by the building of two blockade-running submarines, Deutschland and Bremen.

== Foreign relations ==
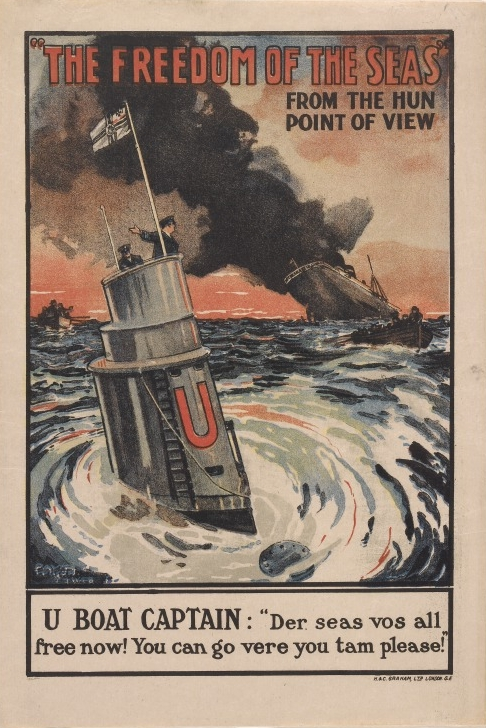
The Freedom of the Seas. From the Hun Point of View British propaganda poster illustrating contradiction between German diplomatic stance and submarine attacks

While militarily Britain kept a firm hold of the situation, the diplomatic situation was more fluid. Britain's blockade did not cover Germany's surrounding neutral countries, and so could not be truly effective without their cooperation. German markets could offer high prices, and thus imports from these countries soared. The Netherlands became the biggest food supplier to Germany in 1915, with cheese exports tripling and some other products quintupling. Germany had prevented them from exporting to occupied Belgium, and Dutch traders found they could profit by consuming imports and exporting domestic production to bypass Allied requests to not allow re-exportation. To counter this, from 1916 the Entente Powers made deals to purchase commodities in these countries at above-market prices, to prevent them from being bought by the Germans. This operation was overseen in the United Kingdom by the Ministry of Blockade. This was not initially successful, especially as Germany responded by torpedoing Dutch ships, forcing their exports to go to Germany. Other British officials saw Sweden as the "principal offender", as it was also increasing imports from America enormously so that it could export to Germany at a profit. Exports to Germany from Sweden, Denmark and Norway increased in 1915 to almost exactly equal the loss of trade with the US. The Entente could do little to intervene as the Swedes also controlled the transit of goods to Russia. In 1916, German Chancellor Theobald von Bethmann-Hollweg declared that without the support of the neutrals, Germany would have collapsed.

The Germans also heavily lobbied both the U.S. government and the American business community to intervene. German diplomats repeatedly pointed out that the blockade was hurting American exports. Under pressure, especially from commercial interests wishing to profit from wartime trade with both sides, Woodrow Wilson's administration protested vigorously. Britain did not wish to antagonise the Americans and set up a program to buy American cotton, guaranteed that the price stayed above peacetime levels and mollified cotton traders. When American ships were stopped with contraband, the British purchased the entire cargo and released the cargoless ship.

Ultimately, the British were more successful with neutral countries as their blockade was careful to limit inconveniences to neutrals, while German efforts at raiding traffic to the UK had the effect of alienating world opinion, aiding the British efforts. Dutch diplomats, for example, explained that their cooperation with Germany was only out of fear that the Germans would otherwise "torpedo their vessels without mercy". The British were also able to exert pressure through controlling British exports, such as coal and fertilizer, and by making the threat of potentially extending the blockade. As the war went on, therefore, neutral countries cooperated more and more with the British, and so the blockade at last began to bite. Things only worsened with the February 1917 German declaration of unrestricted submarine warfare (which meant a loss of neutral tonnage, both through ships sunk and Allied requisition of vessels) and the subsequent American entry into World War I (which added immense US pressure to British efforts). Sweden, as an example, was one of the last to give in. Even despite the sinking (by 1916) of almost 100 of their ships by German U-boats, even during the failed harvest of 1916 where Sweden suffered famine, Sweden had continued to export food and iron ore to Germany. But the Hjalmar Hammarskjöld government fell the next year, and combined Anglo-American pressure forced increasing restrictions on export to Germany until a full prohibition in May 1918. The United States' entry into the war ensured that the blockade would be tightened even further as it could exert pressure on neutral nations to stop trading with Germany, control the trans-Atlantic flow of supplies, institute the convoy system and create the North Sea Mine Barrage.

According to historian Alan Kramer, a related and perhaps more important issue for Germany was simply the fact that Germany ended up at war with most of its trading partners. Kramer notes that of the 2.5 million tons of wheat Germany imported in 1913, 0.85m tons came from Canada and Russia, 0.09m tons came from Romania (which joined the Allies in 1916) and 1.0m tons came from the US. Further, more than half of Germany's exports, with which it might expect to pay for imports, were to Britain, Russia and France.

== Effects on war ==
=== Strategic materials ===
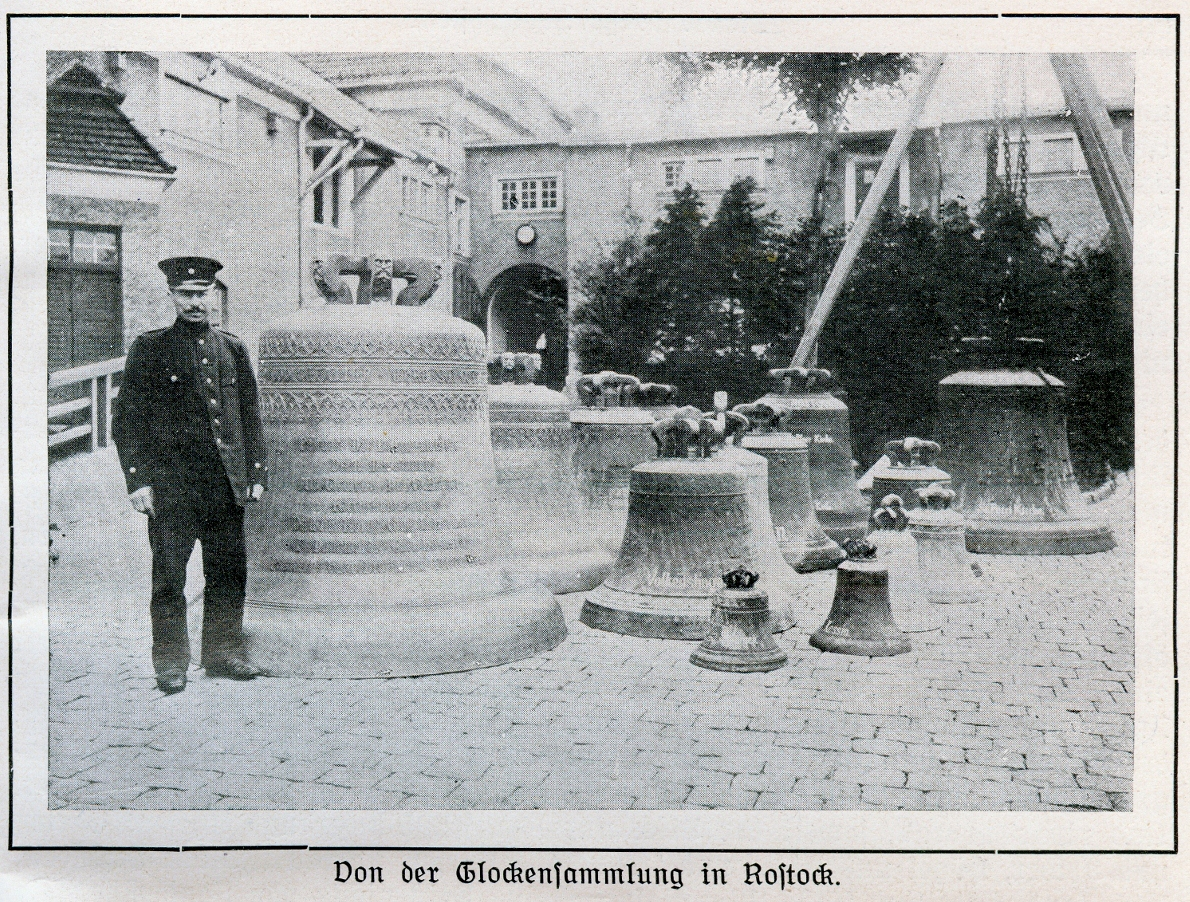
Church bells for recycling at Rostock in 1917.

Before the war, more than 50% of German imports had been raw or semi-finished materials for German industry; chiefly textile fibres and yarn, animal hides, non-ferrous metals and ores, timber, iron ore, coal, crude oil and oil products, saltpeter and rubber. Although at the outbreak of war, stocks of strategic materials amounted to only three to six months of pre-war consumption, Germany was able to mitigate the effects of the blockade in a number of ways. Scrap and raw materials such as coal and iron ore were taken from occupied territories in France and Belgium. Inside Germany, old mines were reopened and material was recovered from spoil heaps. Scrap was recycled from the battlefield and from the civilian population; for instance, a decree of March 1917 ordered church bells to be smelted for the war effort, resulting in the loss of 44% of Germany's bells. Other shortages were mitigated by substitution, aided by Germany's well-developed chemical industry and university research departments; an example is the extraction of saltpeter from ammonia made by the Haber–Bosch process. Supplies could also be obtained from within the Central Powers alliance, such as bauxite for aluminium production from Austria-Hungary and oil from Austrian Galicia. Oil was also imported overland from Romania, until it joined the Entente in mid-1916.

A Daimler truck with iron tyres.

However, not all of the shortages could be made good. Lack of rubber meant that trucks had to be fitted with iron tyres, limiting their speed to 12 miles per hour (19 km/h). The army was prioritised for textiles and leather, so that civilians were unable to obtain new clothes and shoes. Weapons programmes were sometimes delayed or cancelled for lack of metals; one example is the production of the German heavy tank, the A7V, the first production model of which was completed in October 1917, but only twenty tanks had reached combat units by the Armistice.

=== Foodstuffs ===
The first English-language accounts of the effects of the blockade of foodstuffs were by humanitarians, diplomats and medical professionals, who were sympathetic to the suffering of the German people. The official German account, based on data about disease, growth of children, and mortality, harshly criticised the Allies by calling the blockade a crime against innocent people. The first account commissioned by the Allies was written by Professor A. C. Bell and Brigadier-General Sir James E. Edmonds, hypothesised that the blockade led to revolutionary movements but concluded that based on the evidence, "it is more than doubtful whether this is the proper explanation". Germans wanted to end the war because of the food shortage, but workers staged a revolution because of the long-term theory of socialism. The revolutionaries claimed in their slogans, for example, that they were Arbeitssklaven (worker slaves) to the monarchy. Edmonds, on the other hand was supported by Colonel Irwin L. Hunt, who was in charge of civil affairs in the American occupied zone of the Rhineland, and held that food shortages were a post-armistice phenomenon caused solely by the disruptions of the German Revolution of 1918–19.

More recent studies also disagree on the severity of the blockade's impact on the affected populations at the time of the revolution and the armistice. Some hold that the blockade starved Germany and the Central Powers into defeat in 1918. Others hold that the armistice on 11 November was forced primarily by events on the Western Front, rather than any actions of the civilian population. The idea that a revolt of the home front forced the armistice was part of the stab-in-the-back myth. Also, Germany's largest ally, Austria-Hungary, had already signed an armistice on 3 November 1918, which exposed Germany to an invasion from the south. On 29 September 1918, General Erich Ludendorff told the Kaiser that the military front would soon collapse.

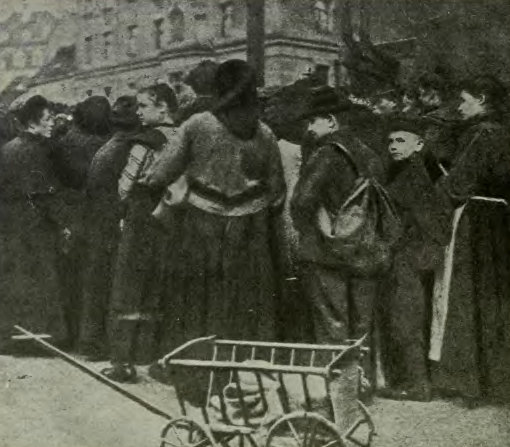
A bread queue in Berlin, 1918.

All scholars agree that the blockade made a large contribution to the outcome of the war. By 1915, Germany's imports had fallen by 55% from its prewar levels and the exports were 53% of what they had been in 1914. Apart from leading to shortages in vital raw materials such as oil and nonferrous metals, the blockade also deprived Germany of supplies of fertiliser that were vital to agriculture - exacerbated by the diversion of existing stocks to munitions production. That led to staples such as grain, potatoes, meat and dairy products becoming so scarce by the end of 1916 that many people were obliged to instead consume ersatz products, including Kriegsbrot ("war bread") and powdered milk. The food shortages caused looting and riots not only in Germany but also in Vienna and Budapest. The food shortages were so severe that by the autumn of 1918, Austria-Hungary hijacked barges on the Danube full of Romanian wheat bound for Germany, which in turn threatened military retaliation. Also, during the winter of 1916 to 1917, there was a failure of the potato crop, which resulted in the urban population having to subsist largely on Swedish turnips. That period became known as the Steckrübenwinter or Turnip Winter.

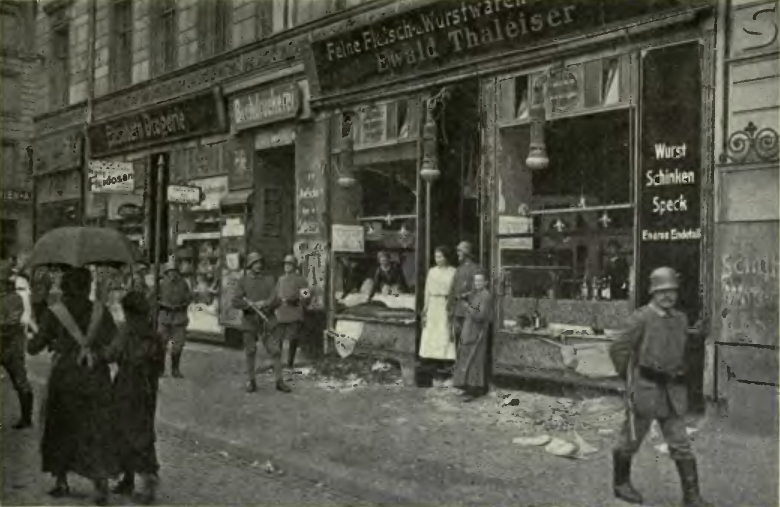
Food riots in Berlin, 1918; a looted shop in Invalidenstraße.

The German government made some attempts to counter the effects of the blockade, with questionable effectiveness. In 1914, statutory price controls on staple items encouraged farmers to switch to unregulated produce, thereby exacerbating shortages. In early 1915, a potato shortage was blamed on the vegetable being used for pig feed, prompting the Schweinemord or "pig massacre" which resulted a glut of pork products, the main protein source for working-class Germans. This was followed by a shortage of pork, as so many pigs had been slaughtered in a short time. A complicated rationing system, initially introduced in January 1915, aimed to ensure that a minimum nutritional need was met, with "war kitchens" providing cheap mass meals to impoverished civilians in larger cities. Yet at times, rations only amounted to 1,000 calories per day, requiring supplementation from the black market the poor could ill afford.

Thus, German policy frequently served to make food shortages worse. Particularly resented was the effect of unequal distribution. Civilians were expected to compensate for the blockade by working harder than ever. For example, the Hindenburg Programme of economic was launched on 31 August 1916 and designed to raise war productivity by the compulsory employment of all men between the ages of 17 and 60, meeting only partial success. But German authorities allocated to urban civilians (representing 67% of the population) only a third of the grain harvest. The military was the true priority, with the 10% of the population in the armed forces allotted 30% of grain and 60% of meat supplies, in addition to foodstuffs looted from the occupied territories. Even as a food crisis loomed on the eve of the armistice, the army built up a reserve of 1.5 million tons of grain (equivalent to 7 months of pre-war imports), plus other foodstuffs, for a possible last-ditch battle.

Around a quarter of the total decline in German food consumption during the war could be attributed to the Allied blockade; however, most of the decline was caused by the collapse in domestic agricultural production, due to the mobilisation of labour, horses and other resources for the war effort. For example, monthly imports of rye and wheat declined from 20,000 long tons in 1916 to just over 3,000 in 1917, while domestic output fell from 985,000 tons to 703,000 tons monthly in the same period.

== After armistice ==
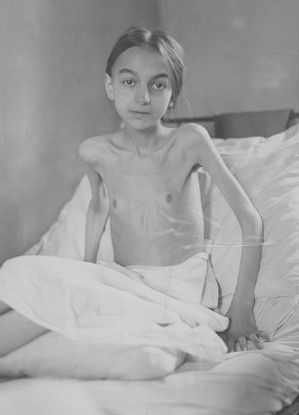
Press image of a malnourished German girl with tuberculosis. Photo marked 1918–1920.

The war ended with the Armistice of 11 November 1918:

Twenty-six - The existing blockade conditions set up by the allied and associated powers are to remain unchanged, and all German merchant ships found at sea are to remain liable to capture. The Allies and the United States should give consideration to the provisioning of Germany during the armistice to the extent recognized as necessary.

— Armistice document

The blockade would therefore continue until Germany would sign a formal peace agreement. In early 1919, rations in German cities were on average 1,500 calories per day. In the short term Germany would stave off starvation by consuming reserves (often reallocated against governments attempts to secure them for military use) but such supplies could not last forever.

The Americans were most concerned about the bad conditions in Germany, with US Food Administrator Herbert Hoover desiring an almost immediate end to the blockade so the US could sell its surplus. The French were the most hostile, fearful of a renewed invasion. Britain was somewhere between, with Winston Churchill one of the figures who took notice. In March he stressed the need for a speedy settlement to the British House of Commons: "We are holding all our means of coercion in full operation, or in immediate readiness for use. We are enforcing the blockade with vigour. We have strong armies ready to advance at the shortest notice. Germany is very near starvation. The evidence I have received from the officers sent by the War Office all over Germany shows, first of all, the great privations which the German people are suffering, and, secondly, the great danger of a collapse of the entire structure of German social and national life under the pressure of hunger and malnutrition. Now is therefore the moment to settle".

Indeed, negotiations had dragged on with little progress for the first four months. Though the armistice made mention of food supplies, the Entente dragged their feet on questions such as fishing rights and how Germany was to pay for food. For the Germans, in negotiations from January 1919 to March 1919, they refused to agree to the Allied demand to temporarily surrender its merchant ships to their control so as to provide transport. The head of the German armistice delegation, Matthias Erzberger wanted guarantees that the food imports could be financed with foreign credit owed to German businesses. Leaders in industry and government feared that the Allies might confiscate the fleet as reparations so as to gain a competitive edge over German industries. Privately, German authorities had initially considered the armistice only a temporary cessation of the war (so that they can regroup their forces), and feared that when fighting broke out again, the ships would be confiscated outright. In January 1919, German officials notified an American representative in Berlin that the shortage of food would not become critical until late spring, with some leaders urging a delay in shipments so as to avoid strengthening the German left. Ultimately, food began arriving in American ships in March, and facing the threat of food riots, Germany finally agreed to surrender its fleet on 14 March 1919. The Allies allowed Germany, under their supervision, to import 300,000 tons of grain and 70,000 tons of cured pork per month until August 1919, making them the largest recipient of food imports. The remaining restrictions were finally lifted on 12 July 1919 after Germany had signed the Treaty of Versailles.

== Death toll ==
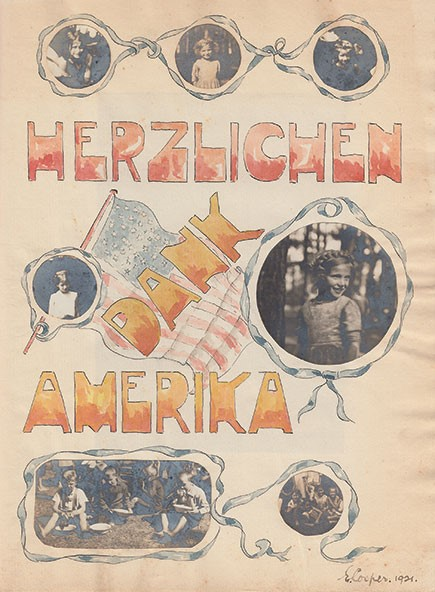
"Sincere thanks America". Scrapbook given to American Quaker relief program to aid German children, 1921.

The official German statistics estimated 763,000 civilian malnutrition and disease deaths were caused by the blockade of Germany. The statistics came from a German National Health Office report published in December 1918 that estimated the blockade to be responsible for the deaths of 762,796 civilians, and the report claimed that that figure did not include deaths caused by the Spanish flu epidemic in 1918 because the figures for the last six months of 1918 were estimated by the first six months. This estimate has been heavily criticised. Maurice Parmelle maintained that "it is very far from accurate to attribute to the blockade all of the excess deaths above pre-war mortality" and believed that the German figures were "somewhat exaggerated", while in 1985 C. Paul Vincent wrote that the estimate's methodology was "peculiar" and so the estimate was impossible to confirm, possibly too high. Historian Alan Kramer notes that many authors have taken the estimate at face value, but cautions that it comes from a partisan source in a context of "quivering nationalist hatred". The German claims were made while Germany was waging a propaganda campaign to end the Allied blockade of Germany after the armistice. Germany also raised the issue of the Allied blockade to counter charges against the German use of submarine warfare.

In 1928, a German academic study, sponsored by the Carnegie Endowment for International Peace provided a thorough analysis of the German civilian deaths during the war. The study estimated 424,000 war-related deaths of civilians over the age of one in Germany, not including Alsace-Lorraine, and the authors attributed the civilian deaths over the prewar level primarily to food and fuel shortages in 1917–1918. The study also estimated an additional 209,000 Spanish flu deaths in 1918. A study sponsored by the Carnegie Endowment for International Peace in 1940 estimated the German civilian death toll at over 600,000. Based on the 1928 German study, it maintained, "A thorough inquiry has led to the conclusion that the number of 'civilian' deaths traceable to the war was 424,000, to which number must be added about 200,000 deaths caused by the influenza epidemic".

The historian and demographer Jay Winter estimated that there were 300,000 excess deaths in Germany from the blockade, after subtracting deaths from the influenza epidemic. In 2014, Kramer calculated that paradoxically, British civilian excess mortality increased at a higher rate than Germans (1.3%, compared to Germany's ~1%). While the British did not suffer hunger (since the U-boat campaign failed dismally in its objectives), deaths came from diseases associated with bad wartime conditions.

Official German figures for the death toll from the blockade do not cover the postwar period, though Dr. Max Rubner in an April 1919 article claimed that 100,000 German civilians had died from the continuation of the blockade of Germany after the armistice. The British Labour Party antiwar activist Robert Smillie issued a statement in June 1919 condemning continuation of the blockade and giving the same figure.

From a more modern perspective, in 1985 C. Paul Vincent found that no reliable death toll data exist for the period immediately after the November 1918 armistice, but maintains that for the German people, they were the most devastating months, as "Germany's deplorable state further deteriorated." N. P. Howard places half of his overall estimate of 474,085 excess civilian deaths (including influenza) into the postwar period, but attributes around 100,000 to incipient famine conditions in the first month. Conditions greatly improved after soldier's councils raided large military food reserves (set aside for a continuation of the war) and gave them to the civilian population.

Sally Marks argues that accounts of a hunger blockade are a "myth" since worse conditions occurred at the same time in Belgium and the regions of Poland and of northern France that Germany had occupied, and notes known cases of fabricated accounts of starving children. Mary Cox rejects such arguments, writing that even though German reports (including "freakish" photos of starving children) were exaggerated for political effect, even though some parts of Europe may have suffered worse, many millions undoubtedly did suffer intense nutritional deprivation to which intentional Allied policy played some part.

The impact on childhood was assessed by Cox by using newly discovered data, based on heights and weights of nearly 600,000 German schoolchildren, who were measured between 1914 and 1924. The data indicate that children suffered severe malnutrition. Class was a major factor, as the working-class children suffered the most but were the quickest to recover after the war. Recovery to normality was made possible by massive food aid organized by the United States and other former enemies.

== See also ==
- Blockade of the Eastern Mediterranean
- Great Famine of Mount Lebanon
- Dover Patrol
- Economic warfare
- North Sea Mine Barrage
- Northern Patrol
- U-boat Campaign (World War I)
