= Schweinemord =

1915 German food crisis

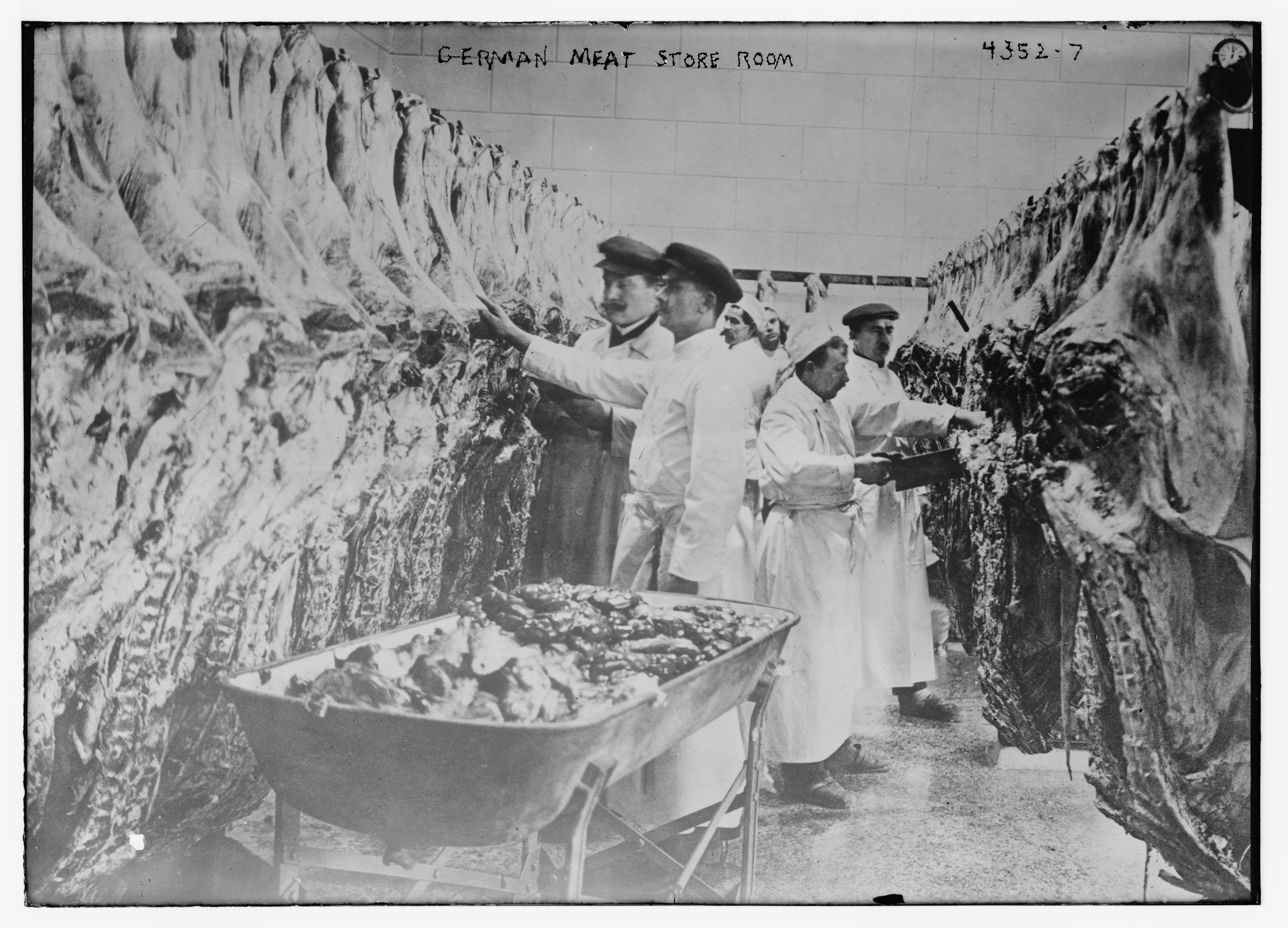
A German meat store in 1915.

The Schweinemord (English: “pig massacre”) was an attempt by the German Empire in 1915 to alleviate domestic food shortages caused by the First World War, by means of a cull of pigs, because it was deemed that they were competing with humans for staple foods. However, the result was counter productive and it was later claimed by the Nazis to be evidence of their stab-in-the-back myth.

== Background ==
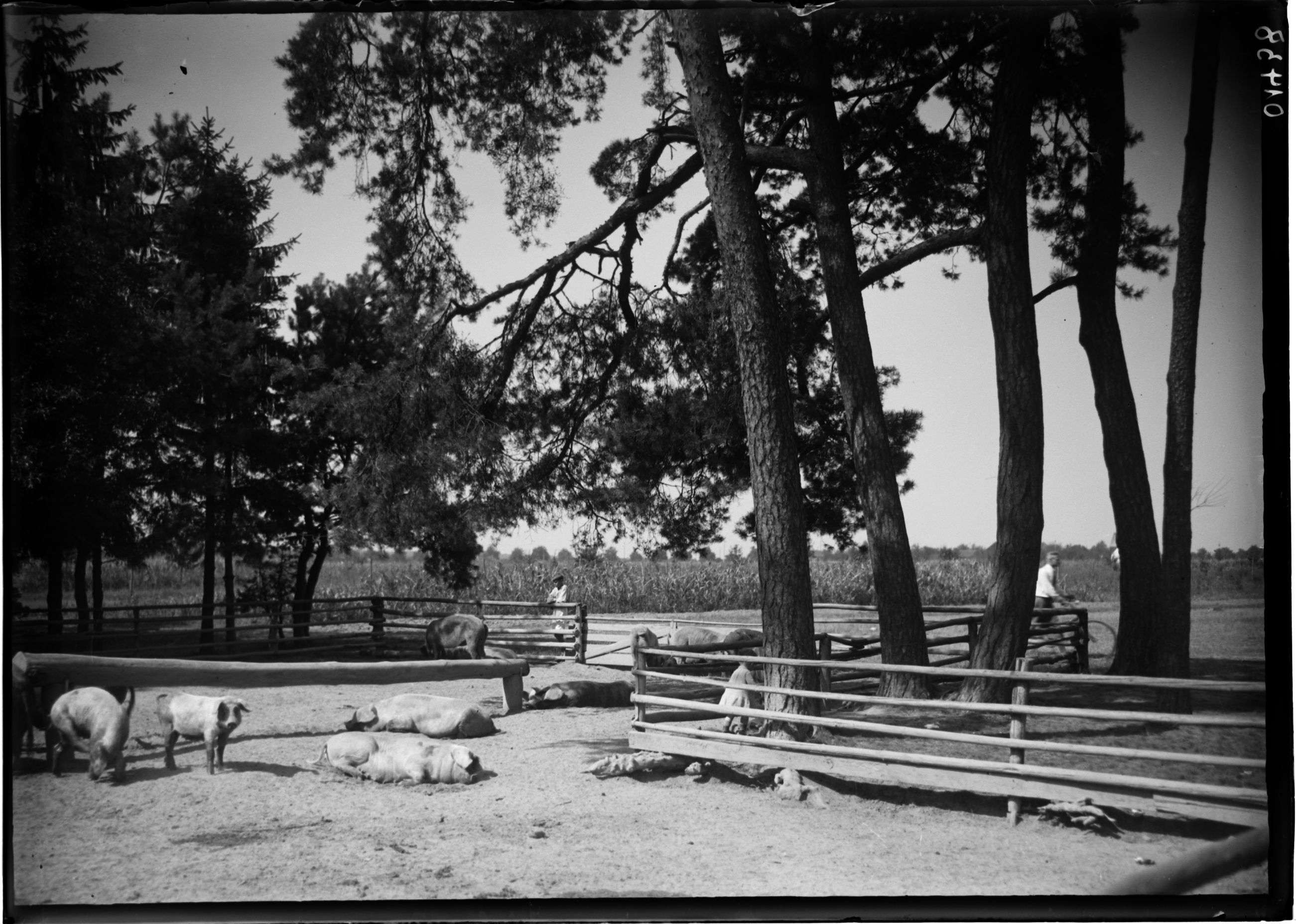
Pig farming in Baden-Württemberg shortly before the war.

In 1914, Germany had made no specific plans to manage its wartime food supplies since in peacetime, it produced about eighty percent of its total consumption and expected that overland imports from neighbouring neutral countries would be unaffected by an Allied naval blockade. Furthermore, a long war was not anticipated and the German General Staff were confident that the war would be over before food shortages might become an issue. However, it soon became clear that Germany would have to fight a long war on two fronts; factors such as the conscription of farm labourers, the requisition of horses, poor weather and the diversion of nitrogen from fertilizer manufacture into military explosives all combined to cause a considerable drop in agricultural output.

== The cull ==
In December 1914, a government-appointed committee chaired by the scholar Paul Eltzbacher recommended that feeding grain and potatoes to pigs was wasteful and that it would be more efficient for humans to consume these staples directly. Additionally, government price controls on staple crops encouraged farmers to feed their produce to their livestock instead of selling it at the mandated low prices. Accordingly, in April 1915, the government ordered that some nine million pigs be slaughtered, despite the protests of farmers who argued that the pigs would be fatter in the autumn. This represented the loss of about one third of the national herd.

== Results ==
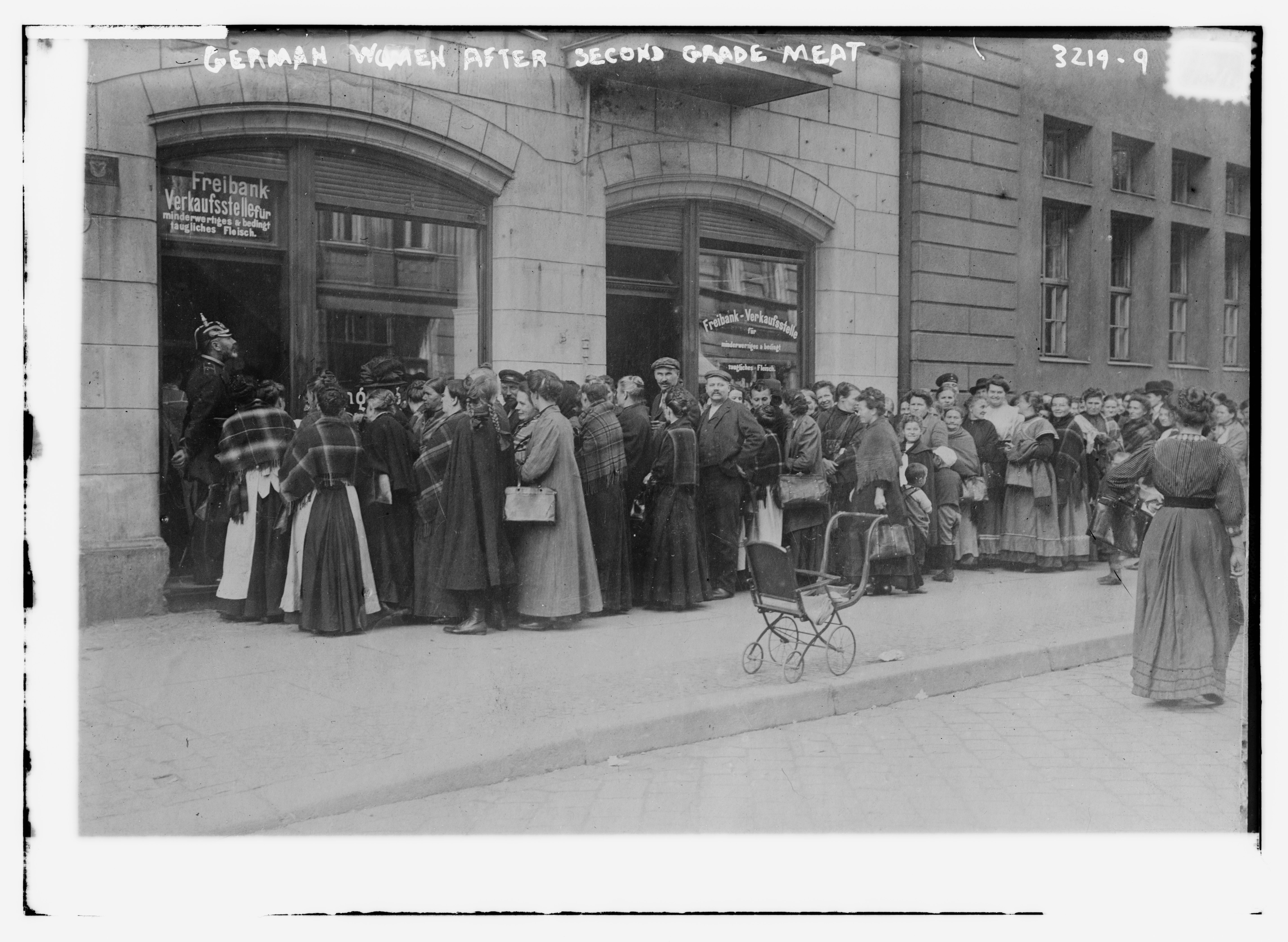
German civilians queueing for meat.

Although the policy created a glut of pork and tenporarily reduced prices, in the long run, it created a serious meat shortage that would last for the remainder of the war. Furthermore, the pigs' manure had been a major source of fertiliser and their loss had a detrimemtal effect on food production in the long run.

In 1937, the Nazi ideologist Richard Walther Darré claimed in a pamphlet that the Schweinemord had been part of a Jewish conspiracy to starve the German population, which had been inspired by the minister for the Kriegsrohstoffabteilung (War Raw Materials Department), Walther Rathenau, who was Jewish.
