= Turnip Winter =

Period of hardship for German civilians during World War I

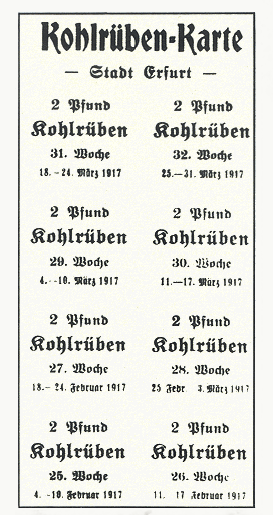
A ration stamp of the city of Erfurt, 1917 for 1 kilogram (2.2 lb) of turnips per week

The Turnip Winter (German: Steckrübenwinter, pronounced [ˈʃtɛkʁyːbn̩ˌvɪntɐ]) of 1916 to 1917 was a period of profound civilian hardship in Germany during World War I, named for the resulting use of turnips as a famine food.

The Turnip Winter occurred during the winter of 1916–1917. Continually poor weather conditions led to a diminished harvest, most notably in cereal production. An ongoing blockade by the Allies of World War I had also reduced Germany's food imports. The food shortages were also attributed to a seizure of horses for the Imperial German Army, the conscription of a large part of the agricultural workforce, and a shortage of farming fertilizers caused by the diversion of nitrogen to the production of explosives. In response to the food shortage, the German government introduced food rationing through the then-new War Food Office. In the summer of 1917, the food allocated offered only 1,560 calories (6,500 kJ) daily diet and dropped to 1,000 calories per day in winter. The Imperial Health Office (renamed "Reich Health Office" in 1918) required 3,000 calories (12,600 kJ) for a healthy adult male, three times what was available in winter. German soldiers relied for their survival on the availability of turnips. Driven by starvation, children started breaking into barns and looting orchards in search of food. Such disregard for authority effectively doubled the youth crime rate in Germany. Historian G.J. Meyer noted that, according to a report from a prominent Berlin physician, "eighty thousand children had died of starvation in 1916". Worker strikes were also common during this time as food shortages often directly led to labor unrest.

== Introduction ==
For the duration of World War I, Germany was constantly under threat of starvation due to the success of the Allied blockade of Germany. Whatever meager rations remained were sent to the troops fighting the war, so the civilian population faced the brunt of the famine. The winter of 1916–1917, later known as the "Turnip Winter", marked one of the harshest years in wartime Germany. Poor autumn weather led to an equally poor potato harvest and much of the produce that was normally shipped to German cities instead rotted in the fields. Germany's massive military recruitment played a direct role in this, as all areas of the economy suffered from lack of manpower, including agriculture. The loss of the potato crop forced the German population to subsist on Swedish turnip or rutabaga as an alternative.

Traditionally used as animal feed, the root vegetable was virtually the only food available throughout the winter of 1917. Malnourishment and illness claimed thousands of lives, mainly those of civilians and wounded soldiers who had returned to the home front. A notable marker of the harsh conditions in Germany was a spike in female mortality, which increased by 11.5% in 1916 and 30% in 1917 when compared to pre-war rates. This rate increased due to malnutrition and disease that was commonplace amongst the German populace. The famine and hardship of the Turnip Winter severely affected the morale within Germany, revealing to the Germans just how hard-pressed the country had become under the duress of the war.

== Background ==
At war with France, Britain, and Russia beginning in the summer of 1914, Germany faced the strain of a two-front war. To evade this compromising situation, the Germans developed a strategy known as the Schlieffen Plan. The Plan proposed that if German troops could invade France through Belgium and defeat the French, quickly removing one front, they would then be able to focus solely on Russia. German faith in the Schlieffen Plan proved overly optimistic and French forces commanded by General Joseph Joffre "checked the German attack at the Marne River in September," in what would be known as the First Battle of the Marne. After facing defeat at the Battle of the Marne, the actual strain of a two-front war became progressively more real for Germany. The Germans had assumed that the Schlieffen Plan would prove successful and that the war would not be a prolonged affair. In the months after the Battle of the Marne, German troops faced a succession of battles against combined British and French armies, known as the "Race to the Sea," where the opposing forces attempted to "turn the other’s flank" in a contest to reach the North Sea.

From October to late November, the armies clashed in a nearly month-long battle at Ypres in Flanders, near the North Sea, which incurred a devastating loss of life for both sides. After Ypres, only months after the beginning of the Great War, the German army had already lost 241,000 men. As the end of 1914 approached, fighting in Western Europe, ultimately known as the "Western Front," settled to a draining affair as the German, French and British lines entrenched themselves. In response to the early land campaigns, the British responded with naval measures. In order to wear down German forces, the Royal Navy, towards the end of 1914, blockaded "the northern approaches to the North Sea in an effort to cut off supplies to the soldiers and civilians of the Central Powers." Locked into sustained fighting on the Western Front, which had already reduced supplies, the Germans now faced both the Russian threat in the east and the British blockade that "cut Germany off from sources of essential commodities."

The British blockade highlighted major flaws in German wartime society. Although the German economy was an international juggernaut that "managed to produce most of the industrial requirements of the war," the nation "failed to secure a sufficiency of food." With continued fighting on two fronts and supplies restricted by the British blockade, German food shortages at home and for troops became increasingly troublesome issues. During the winter of 1916–17, such problems reached new levels in a period known as the "Turnip Winter'".

== The Turnip Winter ==
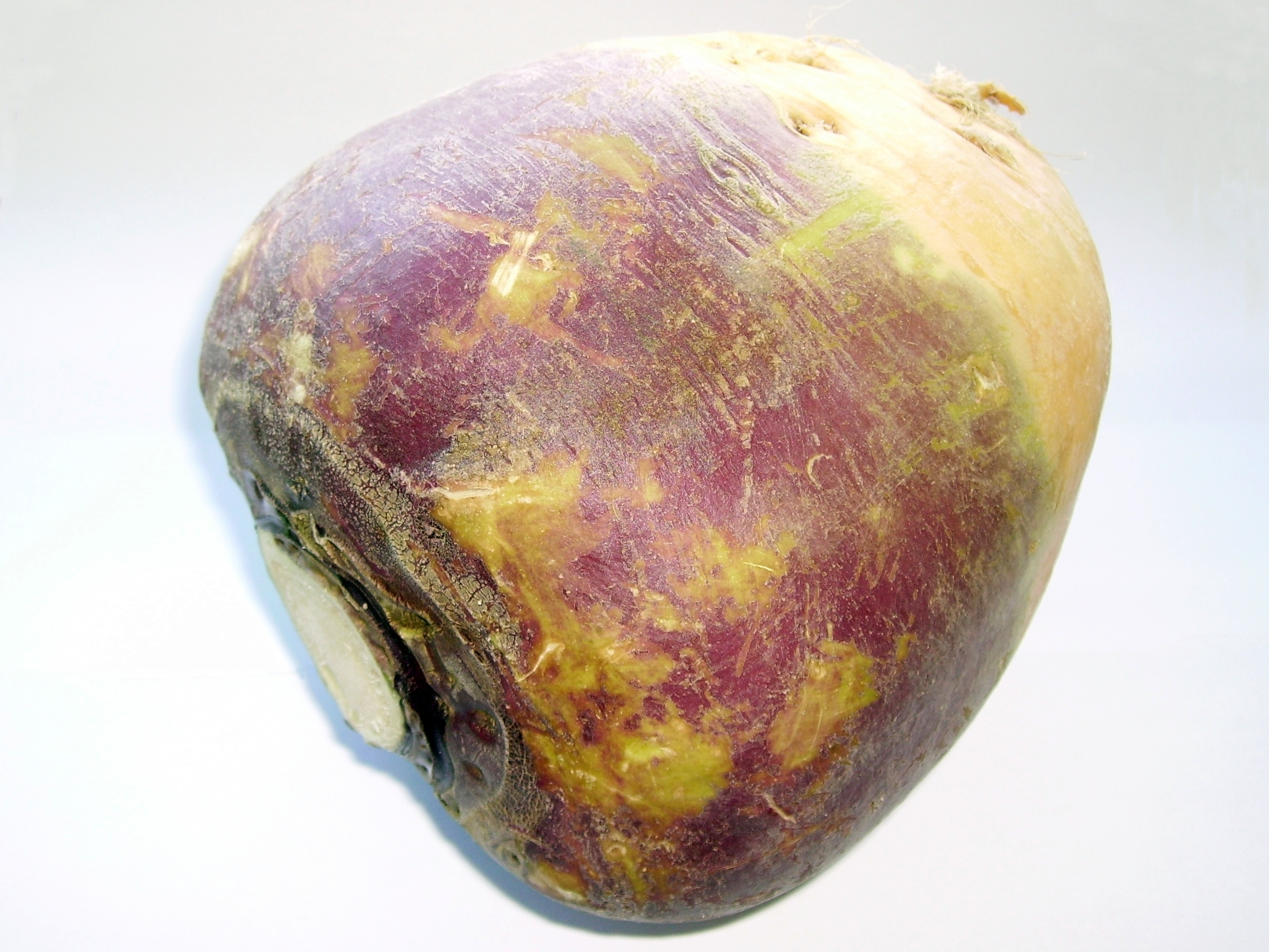
Rutabaga or Swedish turnip – usually used in Germany to feed pigs

The Turnip Winter occurred during the winter of 1916–1917 in Germany. Continually poor weather conditions led to a diminished harvest, most notably in cereal production. Additionally, an Allied blockade first instituted in 1914 contributed to reduced food supplies from the Central Powers by 33 percent. Food shortages were also attributed to a seizure of horses for the Imperial German Army, the conscription of a large part of the agricultural workforce, and a shortage of farming fertilizers caused by the diversion of nitrogen to explosives production.

In response, the German government initiated a food rationing campaign. The campaign began with the establishment of the War Food Office on 22 May 1916. The office was responsible for "the perception of the Chancellor to create and uphold the military and nation's food supply." In the summer of 1917, the food allocated offered only 1,560 calories (6,500 kJ) daily diet and dropped to 1,000 calories per day in winter. However, the Imperial Health Office (renamed "Reich Health Office" in 1918) required 3,000 calories (12,600 kJ) for a healthy adult male, three times what was available in winter. German soldiers "increasingly relied, for sheer survival, on one of the least appealing vegetables known to man, the humble turnip." During this time, the black market became a prominent means of obtaining otherwise scarce foodstuffs. Historian Avner Offer suggests that approximately "one-fifth to one-third of food could only be obtained through illegal channels."

=== Social unrest ===
Driven by starvation, children would break into barns and loot orchards in search of food. Such disregard for authority effectively doubled the youth crime rate in Germany. Historian G.J. Meyer noted that, according to a report from a prominent Berlin physician, "eighty thousand children had died of starvation in 1916." Worker strikes were also common during this time as food shortages often directly led to labor unrest. The most notable strike took place in Düsseldorf in the summer of 1917 where workers complained of uneven food distribution.

=== Military issues ===
In 1916, a naval revolt arose from protests against inedible rations. Sailors claimed that they received rations shorted by two ounces for three consecutive weeks while officers ate and drank luxuriously. The conservative German government believed a Socialist conspiracy was behind the mutiny. In 1926, German officials put Socialist Deputy Wilhelm Dittmann on trial for the uprising. Through letters from sailors to their respective homes, Dittmann illustrated that food was inedible and "did not have any political significance." The letters cleared the Socialist party from accusations that they had sought to extend the Bolshevik Revolution into Germany.

== Aftermath ==
The solution to replace potatoes with turnips greatly affected the diets and nutrition of the German people during and after the war. By the start of the war, Germany consumed potatoes more than any other food, and the shortage greatly changed the gastronomic tastes of the Germans. In addition to affecting the Germans’ tastes, replacing the potatoes did not allow the German people to get the necessary vitamins and minerals they were accustomed to acquiring. The turnips did not affect just the potatoes, but the bread as well. Bread called Kriegsbrot ("War bread") contained flour from potatoes. When replaced by substitutes, the bread became significantly harder to digest, making it difficult for the body to adapt. The Kriegsbrot demonstrates how the Turnip Winter reached the front lines as well, as soldiers were greatly affected by the lack of food. The continued search for substitutes during the blockade truly affected the ability of the German people to obtain food in cities. Evelyn Blücher, an English woman married to Prince Blücher, recounts the experience in her memoir by saying:

We are all growing thinner every day, and the rounded contours of the German nation have become a legend of the past. We are all gaunt and bony now, and have dark shadows round our eyes, and our thoughts are chiefly taken up with wondering what our next meal will be, and dreaming of the good things that once existed.

However, not only were there physical symptoms, as she describes, but also social consequences, such as the pillaging of food stores after the war.

== Sources ==
- Keegan, John (2012) [1998]. The First World War. Knopf Doubleday. ISBN 9780307831705.
- Meyer, Gerald J. (2006). A World Undone: The Story of the Great War 1914 to 1918. Random House. ISBN 978-0-553-80354-9.
- Offer, Avner (1989). The First World War: An Agrarian Interpretation. Clarendon Press. ISBN 9780198219460.
- Robbins, Keith (2002) [1984]. The First World War. Oxford University Press. ISBN 9780191647178.
