= Reichsernährungsamt =

The Kriegsernährungsamt (War Office of Food), which later became the Reichsernährungsamt (Reich Office of Food), was an entity of the government of the German Empire from 1916 to 1919.

== History ==
During the First World War, the German Bundesrat enacted wartime measures to ensure the food supply of the population. As a result, the Kriegsernährungsamt was created on 22 May 1916. The Kriegsernährungsamt, which was formed out of the Reichsamt des Innern (Reich Office of the Interior), was based in Berlin and was under the oversight of the Reich Chancellor. It was to deal with matters of food supply policy of the Reich. The management board of the Office consisted of 7 to 9 members, including the chairman, who was referred to as the Präsident des Kriegsernährungsamtes (President of the War Office of Food).

In 1917 the Kriegsernährungsamt received the status of a Reichsbehörde (Reich agency/authority) and was thereafter led by a secretary of state, who received instructions from the Reich Chancellor. On 19 November 1918 it was renamed the Reichsernährungsamt. Four days later, the Zentral-Einkaufsgesellschaft (central purchasing company) was transferred from the Reichswirtschaftsamt (Reich Office for Economics) to the authority of the Reichsernährungsamt. In March 1919, the functions of the Reichsernährungsamt were taken over by the Reich Ministry of Food and Agriculture.

== Secretaries of state ==
Presidents or secretaries of state of the Kriegsernährungsamt/Reichsernährungsamt
Name	Beginning of term	End of term
Adolf Tortilowicz von Batocki-Friebe	22 May 1916	6 August 1917
Wilhelm von Waldow	6 August 1917	9 November 1918
Emanuel Wurm (USPD)	14 November 1918	13 February 1919
