= Paul Eltzbacher =

German law professor and author

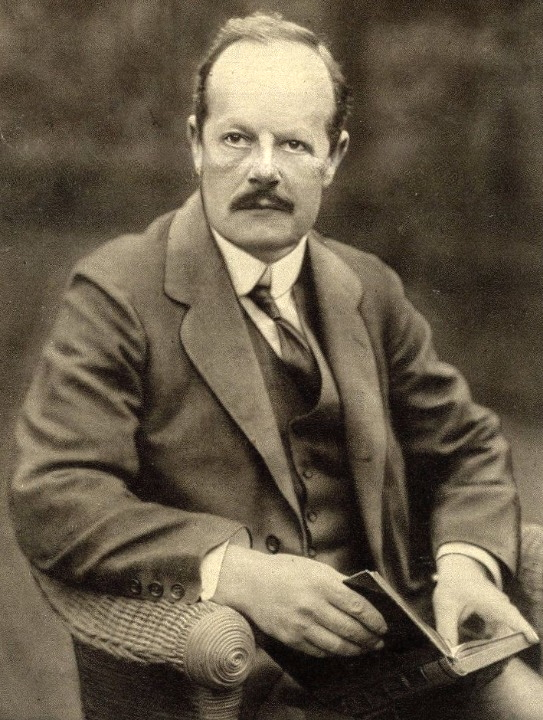
- Born: February 18, 1868; Cologne, Kingdom of Prussia, German Confederation
- Died: October 25, 1928 (aged 60); Berlin, Free State of Prussia, Weimar Republic
- Occupations: Legal solar, professor
- Notable work: Der Anarchismus
- Political party: German National People's Party
- Movement: National Bolshevism
- Relatives: J. Ellis Barker (brother)

Paul Eltzbacher (18 February 1868 – 25 October 1928) was a German legal scholar, professor, and author best known for his influential writings on anarchism and his later role as a right-wing nationalist theorist. Born into a Jewish family in Cologne, Prussian Rhineland; he made significant contributions to the legal understanding of political ideologies and was later considered a precursor of National Bolshevism.

== Early life and education ==
Eltzbacher was born to Dr. Salomon Eltzbacher, a Jewish physician. He pursued legal studies at the universities of Leipzig, Strasbourg, Heidelberg, and Göttingen. From 1890 to 1895, he served as a junior lawyer (Referendar) at the regional courts of Cologne and Frankfurt, taking a year off for military service between 1891 and 1892.

== Academic career and work on anarchism ==
In 1899, Eltzbacher earned his doctorate with a dissertation titled Der Anarchismus ("Anarchism"), published the following year. The work took an abstract legal perspective on the doctrines of seven major anarchist thinkers—William Godwin, Pierre-Joseph Proudhon, Max Stirner, Mikhail Bakunin, Peter Kropotkin, Leo Tolstoy, and Benjamin Tucker. The book was widely praised for its impartial and systematic approach, receiving favorable recognition even from anarchist intellectuals such as Kropotkin and Tolstoy.

The book was translated into multiple languages, including English, Spanish, French, Portuguese, Hebrew, Yiddish, Russian, and Dutch, and it was advertised and discussed in the anarchist press throughout Europe and the Americas.

In 1900, he became a lecturer at the Martin Luther University of Halle-Wittenberg, and by 1906 he was appointed professor at the Berlin School of Commerce, where his teaching and publications shifted toward civil law and commercial law.

In late 1914, he chaired an advisory committee on how best to manage Germany's resources in World War I. The committee recommended that foodstuffs being fed to pigs would be more efficiently used to directly feed the population; the result was the Schweinemord or "pig massacre" in the spring of 1915, which led to both a shortage of pork and of pig manure as fertilizer, thus decreasing crop yields.

== Political views and National Bolshevism ==
Following the defeat of Germany in World War I and the signing of the Treaty of Versailles, Eltzbacher underwent a dramatic ideological transformation. In his 1919 work, Der Bolschewismus und die deutsche Zukunft ("Bolshevism and the German Future"), he argued that Germany could regenerate itself by adopting a form of Bolshevism and forging an alliance with the newly formed Soviet Union. He advocated for full nationalization of the economy without compensation and described a future in which Germany's national interest and socialist governance could be reconciled.

Eltzbacher’s ideas were publicized in the conservative newspaper Deutsche Tageszeitung, which coined the term "National Bolshevism" to describe his hybrid ideology combining elements of nationalism, socialism, and authoritarianism. He soon became affiliated with the German National People's Party (DNVP), a right-wing political party in the Weimar Republic.

In April 1919, as a deputy in the Reichstag, he called for complete state ownership of the economy without compensation—an extreme position even among the more radical wings of the German political spectrum.

== Personal life ==
He was the brother of J. Ellis Barker (born Otto Julius Eltzbacher), a British naturopath and controversialist who emigrated to the United Kingdom and became an outspoken critic of his native Germany.

Eltzbacher died in Berlin on 25 October 1928 at the age of 60.

== Legacy ==
Eltzbacher’s archive, containing manuscripts and correspondence with anarchist and socialist intellectuals—including Luigi Bertoni, Jean Grave, Gustav Landauer, John Henry Mackay, Max Nettlau, Élisée Reclus, Rudolf Rocker, Vladimir Tchertkoff, and Benjamin Tucker—was partly acquired in the 1920s by Japanese scholars Kushida Tamizō and Morito Tatsuo. These materials are preserved today at the Hōsei University Ōhara Institute for Social Research (大原社会問題研究所) in Tokyo, Japan. Additional documents are held by the International Institute of Social History (IISH) in Amsterdam.

== Books ==
- The Great Anarchists: Ideas and Teachings of Seven Major Thinkers, ISBN 0-486-43632-2.
- Anarchism, ISBN 0-912378-01-8
