= Individualism =

Political and social philosophy emphasizing the individual

Individualism is the moral stance, political philosophy, ideology, and social outlook that emphasizes the worth or central role of the individual. Individualists promote realizing one's goals and desires, valuing independence and self-reliance, and advocating that the interests of the individual should take precedence over the state or a social group, while opposing external interference with one's interests by society or institutions such as the government. Individualism focuses on the individual and thus starts "with the fundamental premise that the human individual is of primary importance in the struggle for liberation".

Individualism represents one type of sociocultural perspective and is often defined in contrast to other perspectives, such as communitarianism, collectivism, and corporatism.

Individualism is also associated with artistic and bohemian interests and lifestyles, which tend toward self-creation and experimentation rather than tradition or popular opinions and behaviors, and it is also associated with humanist philosophical positions and ethics. "Individualism" has also been used as a term denoting "The quality of being an individual; individuality", related to possessing "An individual characteristic; a quirk".

== Etymology ==
In the English language, the word individualism was first introduced as a pejorative by utopian socialists such as the Owenites in the late 1830s, although it is unclear whether they were influenced by Saint-Simonianism or developed the term independently. A more positive use of the term in Britain emerged in the writings of James Elishama Smith, a millenarian-turned-socialist and Christian Israelite. Although an early follower of Robert Owen, he eventually rejected Owen's collective conception of property and found in individualism a "universalism" that allowed for the development of the "original genius". Without individualism, Smith argued, individuals cannot amass property to increase their happiness. William Maccall, another Unitarian preacher and probably an acquaintance of Smith, came to similar conclusions somewhat later, influenced by John Stuart Mill, Thomas Carlyle and German Romanticism, in his 1847 work Elements of Individualism.

== Individual ==
An individual is a single human being as contrasted with a social group or institution. Historically, the word entered English in the 15th century from the Latin individuus, meaning "indivisible" or "inseparable". Before the 17th century, the term did not carry its modern connotation of human separateness and was used primarily in discussions of metaphysics. In political and social philosophy, the individual is the fundamental unit of individualism, which emphasizes the moral worth, autonomy, and freedom of the person.

=== Individuation principle ===
The principle of individuation, or principium individuationis, describes the manner in which a thing is identified as distinct from other things. For Carl Jung, individuation is a process of transformation whereby the personal and collective unconscious is brought into consciousness (by means of dreams, active imagination, or free association for example) to be assimilated into the whole personality. It is a natural process necessary for the integration of the psyche to take place. Jung considered individuation to be the central process of human development. In L'individuation psychique et collective, Gilbert Simondon developed a theory of individual and collective individuation in which the individual subject is considered an effect of individuation rather than a cause. Thus, the individual atom is replaced by an ongoing ontological process of individuation. Individuation is an always incomplete process, leaving a "pre-individual" leftover that makes future individuations possible. The philosophy of Bernard Stiegler draws upon and modifies Gilbert Simondon's work on individuation and similar ideas in Friedrich Nietzsche and Sigmund Freud. For Stiegler, "the I, as a psychic individual, can only be thought in relationship to we, which is a collective individual. The I is constituted in adopting a collective tradition, which it inherits and in which a plurality of I's acknowledge each other's existence."

== Individualism and society ==
Individualism holds that a person taking part in society attempts to learn and discover their own interests are on a personal basis, without necessarily following the interests of a societal structure (an individualist need not be an egoist). An individualist does not necessarily follow one particular philosophy. They may create an amalgamation of elements from many philosophies, based on personal interests in particular aspects that they find useful. On a societal level, an individualist participates on a personally structured political and moral basis. Independent thinking and opinion are necessary traits of an individualist. Jean-Jacques Rousseau argued that his concept of the general will in The Social Contract is not a simple collection of individual wills and that it furthers the interests of the individual because, in Rousseau's view, the constraint of law benefits the individual because failing to respect the law entails ignorance and submission to one's passions rather than the autonomy of reason.

Individualism versus collectivism is a common dichotomy in cross-cultural research. Global comparative studies have found that the world's cultures vary in the degree to which they emphasize individual autonomy, freedom, and initiative (individualistic traits), as opposed to conformity to group norms, maintaining traditions, and obedience to in-group authority (collectivistic traits). Cultural differences between individualism and collectivism are differences in degree, not in kind. Cultural individualism is strongly correlated with GDP per capita and venture capital investment. The cultures of economically developed regions such as Australia, New Zealand, Japan, South Korea, North America, and Western Europe are among the most individualistic in the world. Middle income regions such as Eastern Europe, South America, and mainland East Asia have cultures that are neither highly individualistic nor highly collectivistic. The most collectivistic cultures in the world are from economically developing regions such as the Middle East and Northern Africa, Sub-Saharan Africa, South and South-East Asia, Central Asia and Central America. Against this background, a number of prominent authors from various disciplines (e.g., Louis Dumont, Geert Hofstede, Anthony Giddens, Zygmunt Bauman, Ronald Inglehart) have supported the influential thesis that the modernization of a society goes hand in hand with an increasing degree of individualization. However, this thesis has also found its critics, who point out, among other things, that the cultural-historical development of individualism from antiquity to the present has not proceeded in a straight line, that some societies with a more collectivist orientation are nevertheless highly modernized and that the concepts of individualism, collectivism and modernity lack conceptual clarity so that an appropriately differentiated analysis of the alleged connection is still lacking.

An earlier analysis by Ruth Benedict in her book The Chrysanthemum and the Sword states that societies and groups can differ in the extent to which they are based upon predominantly "self-regarding" (individualistic, and/or self-interested) behaviors, rather than "other-regarding" (group-oriented, and group, or society-minded) behaviors. Ruth Benedict made a distinction, relevant in this context, between guilt societies (e.g. medieval Europe) with an "internal reference standard" and shame societies (e.g. Japan, "bringing shame upon one's ancestors") with an "external reference standard", where people look to their peers for feedback on whether an action is acceptable or not.

Individualism is often contrasted either with totalitarianism or with collectivism, but there is a spectrum of behaviors at the societal level ranging from highly individualistic societies through mixed societies to collectivist.

A 2022 study published by the Journal of Economic Behavior and Organization indicates that the individualistic societies have higher levels of charitable giving, providing a response to critics of individualism and capitalism. The authors propose that individualism increases charity through direct mechanisms (self-interested giving) and indirect mechanisms (reinforcing economic freedom). The findings support classical liberal arguments that individualism has virtues, aligning with the views of thinkers like Adam Smith and David Hume.

=== Methodological individualism ===
Methodological individualism is the view that phenomena can only be understood by examining how they result from the motivations and actions of individual agents. In economics, people's behavior is explained in terms of rational choices, as constrained by prices and incomes. The economist accepts individuals' preferences as givens. Becker and Stigler provide a forceful statement of this view:

On the traditional view, an explanation of economic phenomena that reaches a difference in tastes between people or times is the terminus of the argument: the problem is abandoned at this point to whoever studies and explains tastes (psychologists? anthropologists? phrenologists? sociobiologists?). On our preferred interpretation, one never reaches this impasse: the economist continues to search for differences in prices or incomes to explain any differences or changes in behavior.

== Political individualism ==
"With the abolition of private property, then, we shall have true, beautiful, healthy Individualism. Nobody will waste his life in accumulating things, and the symbols for things. One will live. To live is the rarest thing in the world. Most people exist, that is all."

— Oscar Wilde, The Soul of Man under Socialism, 1891

Individualists are chiefly concerned with protecting individual autonomy against obligations imposed by social institutions (such as the state or religious morality). For L. Susan Brown, "Liberalism and anarchism are two political philosophies that are fundamentally concerned with individual freedom yet differ from one another in very distinct ways. Anarchism shares with liberalism a radical commitment to individual freedom while rejecting liberalism's competitive property relations."

Civil libertarianism is a strain of political thought that supports civil liberties, or which emphasizes the supremacy of individual rights and personal freedoms over and against any kind of authority (such as a state, a corporation and social norms imposed through peer pressure, among others). Civil libertarianism is not a complete ideology; rather, it is a collection of views on the specific issues of civil liberties and civil rights. Because of this, a civil libertarian outlook is compatible with many other political philosophies, and civil libertarianism is found on both the right and left in modern politics. For scholar Ellen Meiksins Wood, "there are doctrines of individualism that are opposed to Lockean individualism [...] and non-Lockean individualism may encompass socialism".

British historians such as Emily Robinson, Camilla Schofield, Florence Sutcliffe-Braithwaite and Natalie Thomlinson have argued that Britons were keen about defining and claiming their individual rights, identities and perspectives by the 1970s, demanding greater personal autonomy and self-determination and less outside control, angrily complaining that the establishment was withholding it. Historians argue that this shift in concerns helped cause Thatcherism and was incorporated into Thatcherism's appeal.

=== Anarchism ===
Within anarchism, individualist anarchism represents several traditions of thought within the anarchist movement that emphasize the individual and their will over any kinds of external determinants such as groups, society, traditions and ideological systems. Individualist anarchism is not a single philosophy but refers to a group of individualistic philosophies that sometimes are in conflict.

In 1793, William Godwin, who has often been cited as the first anarchist, wrote Political Justice, which some consider to be the first expression of anarchism. Godwin, a philosophical anarchist, from a rationalist and utilitarian basis opposed revolutionary action and saw a minimal state as a present "necessary evil" that would become increasingly irrelevant and powerless by the gradual spread of knowledge. Godwin advocated individualism, proposing that all cooperation in labour be eliminated on the premise that this would be most conducive with the general good.

An influential form of individualist anarchism called egoism, or egoist anarchism, was expounded by one of the earliest and best-known proponents of individualist anarchism, the German Max Stirner. Stirner's The Ego and Its Own, published in 1844, is a founding text of the philosophy. According to Stirner, the only limitation on the rights of the individual is their power to obtain what they desire, without regard for God, state, or morality. To Stirner, rights were spooks in the mind, and he held that society does not exist but "the individuals are its reality". Stirner advocated self-assertion and foresaw unions of egoists, non-systematic associations continually renewed by all parties' support through an act of will, which Stirner proposed as a form of organization in place of the state. Egoist anarchists claim that egoism will foster genuine and spontaneous union between individuals. Egoist anarchism has inspired many interpretations of Stirner's philosophy. It was re-discovered and promoted by German philosophical anarchist and LGBT activist John Henry Mackay.

Josiah Warren is widely regarded as the first American anarchist and The Peaceful Revolutionist, the four-page weekly paper he edited during 1833, was the first anarchist periodical published. For American anarchist historian Eunice Minette Schuster, "[i]t is apparent [...] that Proudhonian Anarchism was to be found in the United States at least as early as 1848 and that it was not conscious of its affinity to the Individualist Anarchism of Josiah Warren and Stephen Pearl Andrews. [...] William B. Greene presented this Proudhonian Mutualism in its purest and most systematic form". Henry David Thoreau was an important early influence in individualist anarchist thought in the United States and Europe. Thoreau was an American author, poet, naturalist, tax resister, development critic, surveyor, historian, philosopher and leading transcendentalist, who is best known for his book Walden, a reflection upon simple living in natural surroundings, and his essay Civil Disobedience, an argument for individual resistance to civil government in moral opposition to an unjust state. Later, Benjamin Tucker fused Stirner's egoism with the economics of Warren and Proudhon in his eclectic influential publication Liberty.

From these early influences, anarchism and especially individualist anarchism was related to the issues of love and sex. In different countries, this attracted a small but diverse following of bohemian artists and intellectuals, free love and birth control advocates, individualist naturists nudists as in anarcho-naturism, freethought and anti-clerical activists as well as young anarchist outlaws in what came to be known as illegalism and individual reclamation, especially within European individualist anarchism and individualist anarchism in France. These authors and activists included Oscar Wilde, Émile Armand, Han Ryner, Henri Zisly, Renzo Novatore, Miguel Giménez Igualada, Adolf Brand and Lev Chernyi among others. In his important essay The Soul of Man Under Socialism from 1891, Wilde defended socialism as the way to guarantee individualism and so he saw that "[w]ith the abolition of private property, then, we shall have true, beautiful, healthy Individualism. Nobody will waste his life in accumulating things, and the symbols for things. One will live. To live is the rarest thing in the world. Most people exist, that is all". For anarchist historian George Woodcock, "Wilde's aim in The Soul of Man Under Socialism is to seek the society most favorable to the artist. [...] for Wilde art is the supreme end, containing within itself enlightenment and regeneration, to which all else in society must be subordinated. [...] Wilde represents the anarchist as aesthete". Woodcock finds that "[t]he most ambitious contribution to literary anarchism during the 1890s was undoubtedly Oscar Wilde The Soul of Man Under Socialism" and finds that it is influenced mainly by the thought of William Godwin.

=== Autarchism ===
Autarchism promotes the principles of individualism, the moral ideology of individual liberty and self-reliance whilst rejecting compulsory government and supporting the elimination of government in favor of ruling oneself to the exclusion of rule by others. Robert LeFevre, recognized as an autarchist by anarcho-capitalist Murray Rothbard, distinguished autarchism from anarchy, whose economics he felt entailed interventions contrary to freedom in contrast to his own laissez-faire economics of the Austrian School. LeFevre rejected the term "anarchy" because he believed that historical anarchism embraced active, aggressive attempts to eliminate the state. Instead, he derived the term "autarchism" from the Greek word for "self-rule." To promote these individualist principles, he relied on an educational framework, utilizing his libertarian Freedom School to teach a philosophy of strict non-aggression and personal self-government.

=== Liberalism ===
Liberalism is the belief in the importance of individual freedom. This belief is widely accepted in the United States, Europe, Australia and other Western nations, and was recognized as an important value by many Western philosophers throughout history, in particular since the Enlightenment. It is often rejected by collectivist ideas such as in Abrahamic or Confucian societies, although Taoists were and are known to be individualists. The Roman Emperor Marcus Aurelius wrote praising "the idea of a polity administered with regard to equal rights and equal freedom of speech, and the idea of a kingly government which respects most of all the freedom of the governed".

Liberalism has its roots in the Age of Enlightenment and rejects many foundational assumptions that dominated most earlier theories of government, such as the Divine Right of Kings, hereditary status, and established religion. John Locke and Montesquieu are often credited with the philosophical foundations of classical liberalism, a political ideology inspired by the broader liberal movement. Locke wrote that "no one ought to harm another in his life, health, liberty, or possessions."

In the 17th century, liberal ideas began to influence European governments in nations such as the Netherlands, Switzerland, England and Poland, but they were strongly opposed, often by armed might, by those who favored absolute monarchy and established religion. In the 18th century, the first modern liberal state was founded without a monarch or a hereditary aristocracy in the United States of America. The US Declaration of Independence includes the words which echo Locke that "all men are created equal; that they are endowed by their Creator with certain unalienable rights; that among these are life, liberty, and the pursuit of happiness; that to insure these rights, governments are instituted among men, deriving their just powers from the consent of the governed."

Liberalism comes in many forms. According to John N. Gray, the essence of liberalism is toleration of different beliefs and of different ideas as to what constitutes a good life.

== Philosophical individualism ==
=== Egoist anarchism ===
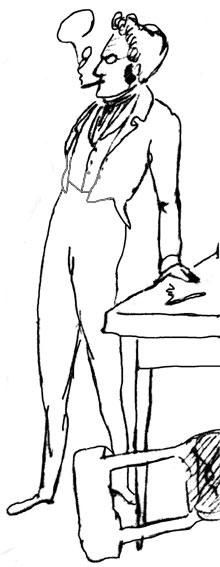
Egoist philosopher Max Stirner has been called a proto-existentialist philosopher while at the same time is a central theorist of individualist anarchism.

Egoist anarchism is a school of anarchist thought that originated in the philosophy of Max Stirner, a 19th-century Hegelian philosopher whose "name appears with familiar regularity in historically orientated surveys of anarchist thought as one of the earliest and best-known exponents of individualist anarchism." According to Stirner, the only limitation on the rights of the individual is their power to obtain what they desire, without regard for God, state, or morality. Stirner advocated self-assertion and foresaw unions of egoists, non-systematic associations continually renewed by all parties' support through an act of will which Stirner proposed as a form of organisation in place of the state.

Egoist anarchists argue that egoism will foster genuine and spontaneous union between individuals. Egoism has inspired many interpretations of Stirner's philosophy, but it has also gone beyond Stirner within anarchism. It was re-discovered and promoted by German philosophical anarchist and LGBT activist John Henry Mackay. John Beverley Robinson wrote an essay called "Egoism" in which he states that "Modern egoism, as propounded by Stirner and Nietzsche, and expounded by Ibsen, Shaw and others, is all these; but it is more. It is the realization by the individual that they are an individual; that, as far as they are concerned, they are the only individual." Stirner and Nietzsche, who exerted influence on anarchism despite its opposition, were frequently compared by French "literary anarchists" and anarchist interpretations of Nietzschean ideas appear to have also been influential in the United States.

=== Ethical egoism ===
Ethical egoism, also called simply egoism, is the normative ethical position that moral agents ought to do what is in their own self-interest. It differs from psychological egoism, which claims that people do only act in their self-interest. Ethical egoism also differs from rational egoism which holds merely that it is rational to act in one's self-interest. However, these doctrines may occasionally be combined with ethical egoism.

Ethical egoism contrasts with ethical altruism, which holds that moral agents have an obligation to help and serve others. Egoism and altruism both contrast with ethical utilitarianism, which holds that a moral agent should treat one's self (also known as the subject) with no higher regard than one has for others (as egoism does, by elevating self-interests and "the self" to a status not granted to others), but that one also should not (as altruism does) sacrifice one's own interests to help others' interests, so long as one's own interests (i.e. one's own desires or well-being) are substantially-equivalent to the others' interests and well-being. Egoism, utilitarianism, and altruism are all forms of consequentialism, but egoism and altruism contrast with utilitarianism, in that egoism and altruism are both agent-focused forms of consequentialism (i.e. subject-focused or subjective), but utilitarianism is called agent-neutral (i.e. objective and impartial) as it does not treat the subject's (i.e. the self's, i.e. the moral "agent's") own interests as being more or less important than if the same interests, desires, or well-being were anyone else's.

Ethical egoism does not require moral agents to harm the interests and well-being of others when making moral deliberation, e.g. what is in an agent's self-interest may be incidentally detrimental, beneficial, or neutral in its effect on others. Individualism allows for others' interest and well-being to be disregarded or not as long as what is chosen is efficacious in satisfying the self-interest of the agent. Nor does ethical egoism necessarily entail that in pursuing self-interest one ought always to do what one wants to do, e.g. in the long term the fulfilment of short-term desires may prove detrimental to the self. Fleeting pleasance then takes a back seat to protracted eudaemonia. In the words of James Rachels, "[e]thical egoism [...] endorses selfishness, but it doesn't endorse foolishness."

Ethical egoism is sometimes the philosophical basis for support of libertarianism or individualist anarchism as in Max Stirner, although these can also be based on altruistic motivations. These are political positions based partly on a belief that individuals should not coercively prevent others from exercising freedom of action.

=== Existentialism ===
Existentialism is a term applied to the work of a number of 19th- and 20th-century philosophers who generally held, despite profound doctrinal differences, that the focus of philosophical thought should be to deal with the conditions of existence of the individual person and their emotions, actions, responsibilities, and thoughts. The early 19th century philosopher Søren Kierkegaard, posthumously regarded as the father of existentialism, maintained that the individual solely has the responsibilities of giving one's own life meaning and living that life passionately and sincerely, in spite of many existential obstacles and distractions including despair, angst, absurdity, alienation and boredom.

Subsequent existential philosophers retain the emphasis on the individual, but differ in varying degrees on how one achieves and what constitutes a fulfilling life, what obstacles must be overcome, and what external and internal factors are involved, including the potential consequences of the existence or non-existence of God. Many existentialists have also regarded traditional systematic or academic philosophy in both style and content as too abstract and remote from concrete human experience. Existentialism became fashionable after World War II as a way to reassert the importance of human individuality and freedom.

Nietzsche's concept of the superman is closely related to the idea of individualism and the pursuit of one's own unique path and potential.

=== Freethought ===
Freethought holds that individuals should not accept ideas proposed as truth without recourse to knowledge and reason. Thus, freethinkers strive to build their opinions on the basis of facts, scientific inquiry and logical principles, independent of any logical fallacies or intellectually limiting effects of authority, confirmation bias, cognitive bias, conventional wisdom, popular culture, prejudice, sectarianism, tradition, urban legend and all other dogmas. Regarding religion, freethinkers hold that there is insufficient evidence to scientifically validate the existence of supernatural phenomena.

=== Humanism ===
Humanism is a perspective common to a wide range of ethical stances that attaches importance to human dignity, concerns, and capabilities, particularly rationality. Although the word has many senses, its meaning comes into focus when contrasted to the supernatural or to appeals to authority. Since the 19th century, humanism has been associated with an anti-clericalism inherited from the 18th-century Enlightenment philosophes. 21st century Humanism tends to strongly endorse human rights, including reproductive rights, gender equality, social justice, and the separation of church and state. The term covers organized non-theistic religions, secular humanism, and a humanistic life stance.

=== Hedonism ===
Philosophical hedonism is a meta-ethical theory of value which argues that pleasure is the only intrinsic good and pain is the only intrinsic bad. The basic idea behind hedonistic thought is that pleasure (an umbrella term for all inherently likable emotions) is the only thing that is good in and of itself or by its very nature. This implies evaluating the moral worth of character or behavior according to the extent that the pleasure it produces exceeds the pain it entails.

=== Libertinism ===
A libertine is one devoid of most moral restraints, which are seen as unnecessary or undesirable, especially one who ignores or even spurns accepted morals and forms of behaviour sanctified by the larger society. Libertines place value on physical pleasures, meaning those experienced through the senses. As a philosophy, libertinism gained new-found adherents in the 17th, 18th, and 19th centuries, particularly in France and Great Britain. Notable among these were John Wilmot, 2nd Earl of Rochester and the Marquis de Sade. During the Baroque era in France, there existed a freethinking circle of philosophers and intellectuals who were collectively known as libertinage érudit and which included Gabriel Naudé, Élie Diodati and François de La Mothe Le Vayer. The critic Vivian de Sola Pinto linked John Wilmot, 2nd Earl of Rochester's libertinism to Hobbesian materialism.

=== Objectivism ===
Objectivism is a system of philosophy created by philosopher and novelist Ayn Rand which holds that reality exists independent of consciousness; human beings gain knowledge rationally from perception through the process of concept formation and inductive and deductive logic; the moral purpose of one's life is the pursuit of one's own happiness or rational self-interest. Rand thinks the only social system consistent with this morality is full respect for individual rights, embodied in pure laissez-faire capitalism; and the role of art in human life is to transform man's widest metaphysical ideas, by selective reproduction of reality, into a physical form – a work of art – that he can comprehend and to which he can respond emotionally. Objectivism celebrates man as his own hero, "with his own happiness as the moral purpose of his life, with productive achievement as his noblest activity, and reason as his only absolute."

=== Philosophical anarchism ===
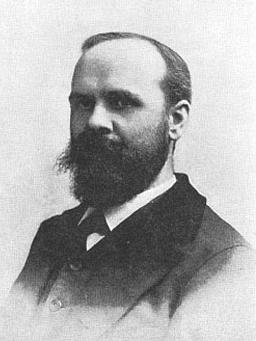
Benjamin Tucker, American individualist anarchist who focused on economics calling them anarchistic-socialism and adhering to the mutualist economics of Pierre-Joseph Proudhon and Josiah Warren

Philosophical anarchism is an anarchist school of thought which contends that the state lacks moral legitimacy. In contrast to revolutionary anarchism, philosophical anarchism does not advocate violent revolution to eliminate it but advocates peaceful evolution to superate it. Although philosophical anarchism does not necessarily imply any action or desire for the elimination of the state, philosophical anarchists do not believe that they have an obligation or duty to obey the state, or conversely that the state has a right to command.

Philosophical anarchism is a component especially of individualist anarchism. Philosophical anarchists of historical note include Mohandas Gandhi, William Godwin, Pierre-Joseph Proudhon, Max Stirner, Benjamin Tucker and Henry David Thoreau. Contemporary philosophical anarchists include A. John Simmons and Robert Paul Wolff.

=== Subjectivism ===
Subjectivism is a philosophical tenet that accords primacy to subjective experience as fundamental of all measure and law. In extreme forms such as solipsism, it may hold that the nature and existence of every object depends solely on someone's subjective awareness of it. In the proposition 5.632 of the Tractatus Logico-Philosophicus, Ludwig Wittgenstein wrote: "The subject doesn't belong to the world, but it is a limit of the world". Metaphysical subjectivism is the theory that reality is what we perceive to be real, and that there is no underlying true reality that exists independently of perception. One can also hold that it is consciousness rather than perception that is reality (subjective idealism). In probability, a subjectivism stands for the belief that probabilities are simply degrees-of-belief by rational agents in a certain proposition and which have no objective reality in and of themselves.

Ethical subjectivism stands in opposition to moral realism, which claims that moral propositions refer to objective facts, independent of human opinion; to error theory, which denies that any moral propositions are true in any sense; and to non-cognitivism, which denies that moral sentences express propositions at all. The most common forms of ethical subjectivism are also forms of moral relativism, with moral standards held to be relative to each culture or society, i.e. cultural relativism, or even to every individual. The latter view, as put forward by Protagoras, holds that there are as many distinct scales of good and evil as there are subjects in the world. Moral subjectivism is that species of moral relativism that relativizes moral value to the individual subject.

Horst Matthai Quelle was a Spanish-language German anarchist philosopher influenced by Max Stirner. Quelle argued that since the individual gives form to the world, he is those objects, the others and the whole universe. One of his main views was a "theory of infinite worlds" which for him was developed by pre-socratic philosophers.

==== Solipsism ====
Solipsism is the philosophical idea that only one's own mind is sure to exist. The term comes from Latin solus ("alone") and ipse ("self"). Solipsism as an epistemological position holds that knowledge of anything outside one's own mind is unsure. The external world and other minds cannot be known, and might not exist outside the mind. As a metaphysical position, solipsism goes further to the conclusion that the world and other minds do not exist. Solipsism is the only epistemological position that, by its own postulate, is both irrefutable and yet indefensible in the same manner. Although the number of individuals sincerely espousing solipsism has been small, it is not uncommon for one philosopher to accuse another's arguments of entailing solipsism as an unwanted consequence, in a kind of reductio ad absurdum. In the history of philosophy, solipsism has served as a skeptical hypothesis.

== Economic individualism ==
The doctrine of economic individualism holds that each individual should be allowed autonomy in making their own economic decisions, as opposed to having those decisions being made by the community, a corporation, or the state for him or her.

=== Classical liberalism ===
Classical liberalism is a political ideology that took shape by the middle of the 19th century in England, Western Europe, and the Americas. It is characterized by its commitment to individual liberty, limited government, and free markets. Classical liberalism was revived in the 20th century by Ludwig von Mises and Friedrich Hayek. The revival also influenced later thinkers such as Milton Friedman, Robert Nozick, Loren Lomasky and Jan Narveson.

=== Libertarianism ===
Libertarianism upholds liberty as a core principle. Libertarians seek to maximize autonomy and political freedom, emphasizing free association, freedom of choice, individualism, and voluntary association. Libertarianism shares a skepticism of authority and state power, but libertarians diverge in the scope of their opposition to existing economic and political systems. Various schools of libertarian thought offer a range of views regarding the legitimate functions of state and private power, often calling for the restriction or dissolution of institutions viewed as coercive. Different categorizations have been used to distinguish among various forms of libertarianism. These categorizations distinguish libertarian views on the nature of property and capital, usually along left–right or socialist–capitalist lines.

==== Left-libertarianism ====
Left-libertarianism represents several related yet distinct approaches to politics, society, culture, and political and social theory that stress both individual and political freedom alongside social justice. Unlike right-libertarians, left-libertarians believe that neither claiming nor mixing one's labor with natural resources is sufficient to generate full private property rights, and maintain that natural resources (land, oil, gold, trees) ought to be held in some egalitarian manner, either unowned or collectively owned. Those left-libertarians who support property do so under different property norms and theories, or under the condition that recompense is offered to the local or global community.

Related terms include egalitarian libertarianism, left-wing libertarianism, libertarian socialism, social libertarianism, and socialist libertarianism. Left-libertarianism can refer generally to these related and overlapping schools of thought:

- Anti-authoritarian varieties of left-wing politics, particularly within the socialist movement, often known as libertarian socialism.
- Geolibertarianism, an American synthesis of libertarianism and Georgism.
- Market anarchism, stressing the socially transformative potential of non-aggression and anti-capitalist free markets.
- Steiner–Vallentyne school, named after Hillel Steiner and Peter Vallentyne, whose proponents draw conclusions from classical liberal or market liberal premises.

Libertarian socialism, sometimes dubbed left-libertarianism and socialist libertarianism, is an anti-authoritarian, anti-statist, and libertarian tradition within the socialist movement that rejects the state-socialist conception of socialism as a form in which the state retains centralized control of the economy. Libertarian socialists criticize wage-slavery relationships within the workplace, emphasizing workers' self-management and decentralized political structures.

Libertarian socialism asserts that a society based on freedom and justice can be achieved by abolishing authoritarian institutions that control certain means of production and subordinate the majority to an owning class or political and economic elite. Libertarian socialists advocate decentralized structures based on direct democracy and federal or confederal associations, such as libertarian municipalism, citizens' assemblies, trade unions and workers' councils.

Taken together, these principles reflect libertarian socialism's emphasis on liberty, free association though opposition to illegitimate authority. Within the larger socialist movement, libertarian socialism seeks to distinguish itself from Leninism and social democracy.

Past and present currents and movements commonly described as libertarian socialist include anarchism (especially anarchist schools of thought such as anarcho-communism, anarcho-syndicalism, collectivist anarchism, green anarchism, individualist anarchism, mutualism, and social anarchism), as well as communalism, some forms of democratic socialism, guild socialism, libertarian Marxism (including autonomism, council communism, left communism, and Luxemburgism, among others), participism, revolutionary syndicalism and some versions of utopian socialism.

==== Right-libertarianism ====
Right-libertarianism represents either non-collectivist forms of libertarianism or a variety of libertarian views that scholars place to the right of libertarianism such as libertarian conservatism. Related terms include conservative libertarianism, libertarian capitalism and right-wing libertarianism. In the mid-20th century, right-libertarian ideologies such as anarcho-capitalism and minarchism adopted the term libertarian to advocate laissez-faire capitalism and strong private property rights in areas such as land, infrastructure and natural resources. Right-libertarian theories commonly ground these positions in principles of self-ownership, individual rights, voluntary exchange, and private property, with limited government serving this role in minarchist theories and private legal institutions serving it in anarcho-capitalist variants. The latter is the dominant form of libertarianism in the United States, where it advocates civil liberties, natural law, free-market capitalism and a major reversal of the modern welfare state.

=== Mutualism ===
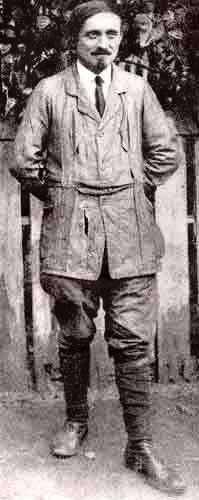
Influential French individualist anarchist Émile Armand

With regard to economic questions within individualist socialist schools such as individualist anarchism, there are adherents to mutualism (Pierre-Joseph Proudhon, Émile Armand and early Benjamin Tucker); natural rights positions (early Benjamin Tucker, Lysander Spooner and Josiah Warren); and egoistic disrespect for "ghosts" such as private property and markets (Max Stirner, John Henry Mackay, Lev Chernyi, later Benjamin Tucker, Renzo Novatore and illegalism). Contemporary individualist anarchist Kevin Carson characterizes American individualist anarchism saying that "[u]nlike the rest of the socialist movement, the individualist anarchists believed that the natural wage of labor in a free market was its product, and that economic exploitation could only take place when capitalists and landlords harnessed the power of the state in their interests. Thus, individualist anarchism was an alternative both to the increasing statism of the mainstream socialist movement, and to a classical liberal movement that was moving toward a mere apologetic for the power of big business."

Mutualism is an anarchist school of thought which can be traced to the writings of Pierre-Joseph Proudhon, who envisioned a socialist society where each person possess a means of production, either individually or collectively, with trade representing equivalent amounts of labor in the free market. Integral to the scheme was the establishment of a mutual-credit bank which would lend to producers at a minimal interest rate only high enough to cover the costs of administration. Mutualism is based on a labor theory of value which holds that when labor or its product is sold, it ought to receive goods or services in exchange embodying "the amount of labor necessary to produce an article of exactly similar and equal utility" and that receiving anything less would be considered exploitation, theft of labor, or usury.

== Criticisms ==
The Greek philosopher Plato emphasized that individuals must adhere to laws and perform duties while declining to grant individuals rights to limit or reject state interference in their lives.

German philosopher Georg Wilhelm Friedrich Hegel criticized individualism by claiming that human self-consciousness relies on recognition from others, therefore embracing a holistic view and rejecting the idea of the world as a collection of atomized individuals.

Fascists believe that the liberal emphasis on individual freedom produces national divisiveness.

Pope Francis criticised a "me"-centred form of individualism in his 2015 encyclical letter Laudato si':

Men and women of our postmodern world run the risk of rampant individualism, and many problems of society are connected with today's self-centred culture of instant gratification.

As an example he comments on parents who "can be prone to impulsive and wasteful consumption, which then affects their children who find it increasingly difficult to acquire a home of their own and build a family."

== Other views ==
=== As creative independent lifestyle ===
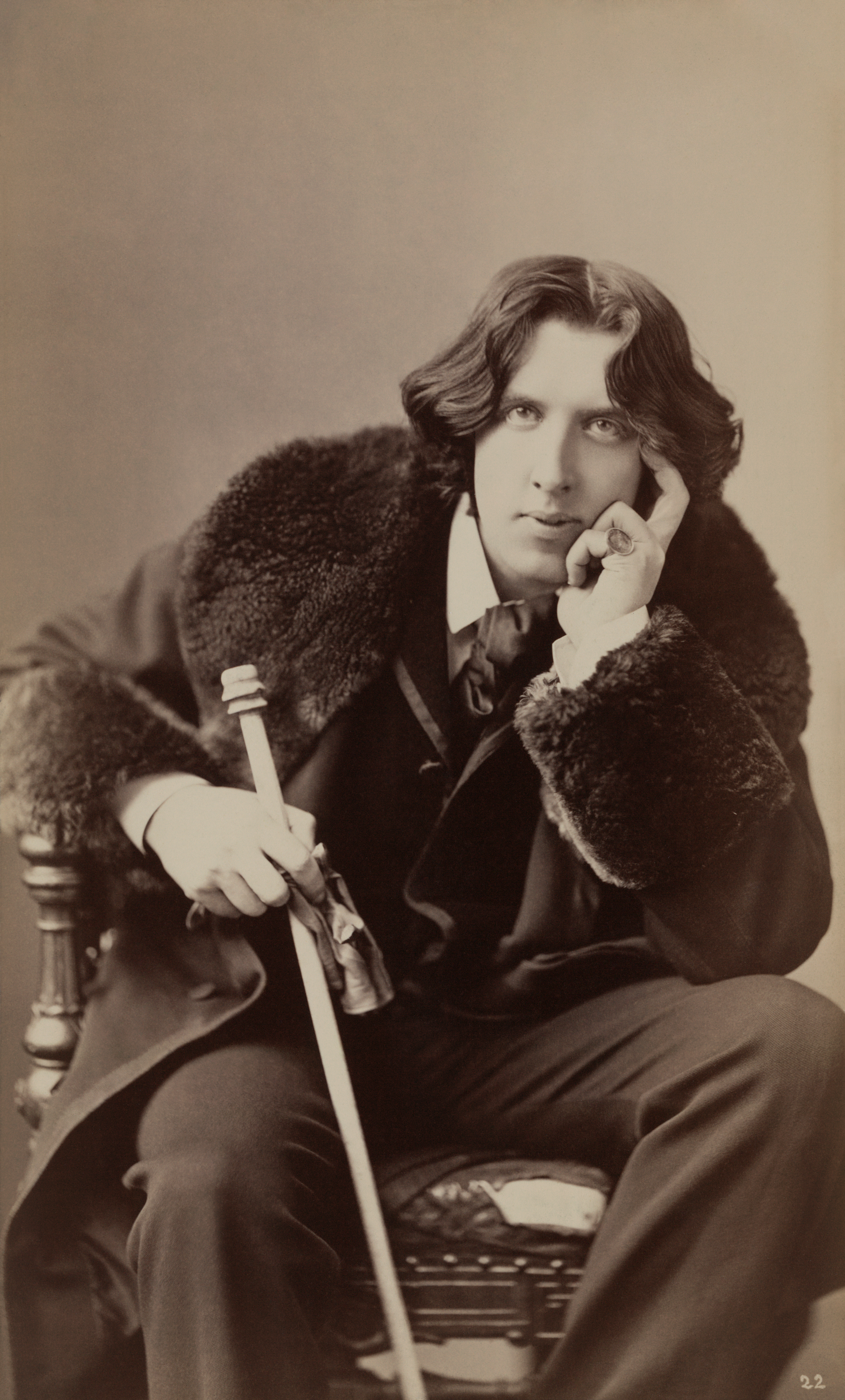
Oscar Wilde, famous Irish socialist author of the decadent movement and famous dandy

The anarchist writer and bohemian Oscar Wilde wrote in his famous essay The Soul of Man under Socialism that "Art is individualism, and individualism is a disturbing and disintegrating force. There lies its immense value. For what it seeks is to disturb monotony of type, slavery of custom, tyranny of habit, and the reduction of man to the level of a machine." For anarchist historian George Woodcock, "Wilde's aim in The Soul of Man under Socialism is to seek the society most favorable to the artist, [...] for Wilde art is the supreme end, containing within itself enlightenment and regeneration, to which all else in society must be subordinated. [...] Wilde represents the anarchist as aesthete." In this way, individualism has been used to denote a personality with a strong tendency towards self-creation and experimentation as opposed to tradition or popular mass opinions and behaviors.

Anarchist writer Murray Bookchin describes a lot of individualist anarchists as people who "expressed their opposition in uniquely personal forms, especially in fiery tracts, outrageous behavior, and aberrant lifestyles in the cultural ghettos of fin de siècle New York, Paris, and London. As a credo, individualist anarchism remained largely a bohemian lifestyle, most conspicuous in its demands for sexual freedom ('free love') and enamored of innovations in art, behavior, and clothing."

In relation to this view of individuality, French individualist anarchist Émile Armand advocated egoistical denial of social conventions and dogmas to live in accord to one's own ways and desires in daily life since he emphasized anarchism as a way of life and practice. In this way, he opined that "the anarchist individualist tends to reproduce himself, to perpetuate his spirit in other individuals who will share his views and who will make it possible for a state of affairs to be established from which authoritarianism has been banished. It is this desire, this will, not only to live, but also to reproduce oneself, which we shall call 'activity.'"

In the book Imperfect Garden: The Legacy of Humanism, humanist philosopher Tzvetan Todorov identifies individualism as an important current of socio-political thought within modernity and as examples of it he mentions Michel de Montaigne, François de La Rochefoucauld, Marquis de Sade, and Charles Baudelaire. In La Rochefoucauld, he identifies a tendency similar to stoicism in which "the honest person works his being in the manner of a sculptor who searches the liberation of the forms which are inside a block of marble, to extract the truth of that matter." In Baudelaire, he finds the dandy trait in which one searches to cultivate "the idea of beauty within oneself, of satisfying one's passions of feeling and thinking."

The Russian-American poet Joseph Brodsky once wrote that "[t]he surest defense against Evil is extreme individualism, originality of thinking, whimsicality, even – if you will – eccentricity. That is, something that can't be feigned, faked, imitated; something even a seasoned imposter couldn't be happy with." Ralph Waldo Emerson famously declared that "[w]hoso would be a man must be a nonconformist" – a point of view developed at length in both the life and work of Henry David Thoreau. Equally memorable and influential on Walt Whitman is Emerson's idea that "a foolish consistency is the hobgoblin of small minds, adored by little statesmen and philosophers and divines". Emerson opposed on principle the reliance on civil and religious social structures precisely because through them the individual approaches the divine second-hand, mediated by the once original experience of a genius from another age. According to Emerson, "[an institution is the lengthened shadow of one man." To achieve this original relation, Emerson stated that one must "[i]nsist on one's self; never imitate", for if the relationship is secondary the connection is lost.

=== Religion ===
The anthropologist Joseph Henrich explores the roots of Western individualism in The WEIRDest People in the World, arguing that it is a legacy of the influence of the medieval Catholic Church's ban on cousin marriage. Henrich argues that the isolated and vulnerable nuclear families created by Church policies were forced to rely on and invest in new kinds of associations for the support they needed and that the growth of these associations created the modern world (including the "peculiar" and individualistic psychology of modern people).

The Catholic Church teaches "if we pray the Our Father sincerely, we leave individualism behind, because the love that we receive frees us ... our divisions and oppositions have to be overcome". Many Catholics have believed Martin Luther and the Protestant Reformation were sources of individualism.

== See also ==
- Anti-individualism
- Individualist feminism
- Individualistic culture
- Market fundamentalism
- Khudi
- Natural and legal rights
- Negative and positive rights
- Non-aggression principle
- Personalism
- Self-help
- Self-interest
- Self-sustainability
- Social issue
- Voluntaryism
