= Egoism =

Philosophy concerning self-regarding motivations or behaviour

Egoism is a philosophy concerned with the role of the self, or ego, as the motivation and goal of one's own action. Different theories of egoism encompass a range of disparate ideas and can generally be categorized into descriptive or normative forms. That is, they may be interested in either describing that people do act in self-interest or prescribing that they should. Other definitions of egoism may instead emphasise action according to one's will rather than one's self-interest, and furthermore posit that this is a truer sense of egoism.

The New Catholic Encyclopedia states of egoism that it "incorporates in itself certain basic truths: it is natural for man to love himself; he should moreover do so, since each one is ultimately responsible for himself; pleasure, the development of one's potentialities, and the acquisition of power are normally desirable." The moral censure of self-interest is a common subject of critique in egoist philosophy, with such judgments being examined as means of control and the result of power relations. Egoism may also reject the idea that insight into one's internal motivation can arrive extrinsically, such as from psychology or sociology, though, for example, this is not present in the philosophy of Friedrich Nietzsche.

== Overview ==
The term egoism is derived from the French égoïsme, from the Latin ego (first person singular personal pronoun; "I") with the French -ïsme ("-ism").

=== Descriptive theories ===
The descriptive variants of egoism are concerned with self-regard as a factual description of human motivation and, in its furthest application, that all human motivation stems from the desires and interest of the ego. In these theories, action which is self-regarding may be simply termed egoistic.

The position that people tend to act in their own self-interest is called default egoism, whereas psychological egoism is the position that all motivations are rooted in an ultimately self-serving psyche. That is, in its strong form, that even seemingly altruistic actions are only disguised as such and are always self-serving. Its weaker form instead holds that, even if altruistic motivation is possible, the willed action necessarily becomes egoistic in serving one's own will. In contrast to this and philosophical egoism, biological egoism (also called evolutionary egoism) describes motivations rooted solely in reproductive self-interest (i.e. reproductive fitness). Furthermore, selfish gene theory holds that it is the self-interest of genetic information that conditions human behaviour.

=== Normative theories ===
Theories which hold egoism to be normative stipulate that the ego ought to promote its own interests above other values. Where this ought is held to be a pragmatic judgment it is termed rational egoism and where it is held to be a moral judgment it is termed ethical egoism. The Stanford Encyclopedia of Philosophy states that "ethical egoism might also apply to things other than acts, such as rules or character traits" but that such variants are uncommon. Furthermore, conditional egoism is a consequentialist form of ethical egoism which holds that egoism is morally right if it leads to morally acceptable ends. John F. Welsh, in his work Max Stirner's Dialectical Egoism: A New Interpretation, coins the term dialectical egoism to describe an interpretation of the egoist philosophy of Max Stirner as being fundamentally dialectical.

Normative egoism, as in the case of Stirner, need not reject that some modes of behavior are to be valued above others—such as Stirner's affirmation that non-restriction and autonomy are to be most highly valued. Contrary theories, however, may just as easily favour egoistic domination of others.

== Theoreticians ==
=== Stirner ===
Stirner's egoism argues that individuals are impossible to fully comprehend, as no understanding of the self can adequately describe the fullness of experience. Stirner has been broadly understood as containing traits of both psychological egoism and rational egoism. Unlike the self-interest described by Ayn Rand, Stirner did not address individual self-interest, selfishness, or prescriptions for how one should act. He urged individuals to decide for themselves and fulfill their own egoism.

Stirner believed that everyone was propelled by their own egoism and desires and that those who accepted this—as willing egoists—could freely live their individual desires, while those who did not—as unwilling egoists—will falsely believe they are fulfilling another cause while they are secretly fulfilling their own desires for happiness and security. The willing egoist would see that they could act freely, unbound from obedience to sacred but artificial truths like law, rights, morality, and religion. Power is the method of Stirner's egoism and the only justified method of gaining philosophical property. Stirner did not believe in the one-track pursuit of greed, which as only one aspect of the ego would lead to being possessed by a cause other than the full ego. He did not believe in natural rights to property and encouraged insurrection against all forms of authority, including disrespect for both private and personal property.

=== Nietzsche ===
I submit that egoism belongs to the essence of a noble soul, I mean the unalterable belief that to a being such as "we," other beings must naturally be in subjection, and have to sacrifice themselves. The noble soul accepts the fact of his egoism without question, and also without consciousness of harshness, constraint, or arbitrariness therein, but rather as something that may have its basis in the primary law of things:—if he sought a designation for it he would say: "It is justice itself." — Friedrich Nietzsche, Beyond Good and Evil

The philosophy of Friedrich Nietzsche has been linked to forms of both descriptive and normative egoism. Nietzsche, in attacking the widely held moral abhorrence for egoistic action, seeks to free higher human beings from their belief that this morality is good for them. He rejects Christian and Kantian ethics as merely the disguised egoism of slave morality.

The word "good" is from the start in no way necessarily tied up with "unegoistic" actions, as it is in the superstition of those genealogists of morality. Rather, that occurs for the first time with the collapse of aristocratic value judgments, when this entire contrast between "egoistic" and "unegoistic" pressed itself ever more strongly into human awareness—it is, to use my own words, the instinct of the herd which, through this contrast, finally gets its word (and its words). — Friedrich Nietzsche, On the Genealogy of Morals

In his On the Genealogy of Morals, Friedrich Nietzsche traces the origins of master–slave morality to fundamentally egoistic value judgments. In the aristocratic valuation, excellence and virtue come as a form of superiority over the common masses, which the priestly valuation, in ressentiment of power, seeks to invert—where the powerless and pitiable become the moral ideal. This upholding of unegoistic actions is therefore seen as stemming from a desire to reject the superiority or excellency of others. He holds that all normative systems which operate in the role often associated with morality favor the interests of some people, often, though not necessarily, at the expense of others.

Nevertheless, Nietzsche also states in the same book that there is no 'doer' of any acts, be they selfish or not:

...there is no "being" behind doing, effecting, becoming; "the doer" is merely a fiction added to the deed—the deed is everything.(§13) — Friedrich Nietzsche, On the Genealogy of Morals

Jonas Monte of Brigham Young University argues that Nietzsche doubted if any 'I' existed in the first place, which the former defined as "a conscious Ego who commands mental states".

=== Other theoreticians ===
- Nikolai Gavrilovich Chernyshevskii, a Russian literary critic and philosopher of nihilism and rational egoism
- Aleister Crowley, who popularized the expression "Do what thou wilt"
- Arthur Desmond as Ragnar Redbeard (possibly, unproved)
- Thomas Hobbes, who is attributed as an early proponent of psychological egoism
- John Henry Mackay, a British-German egoist anarchist
- Bernard de Mandeville, whose materialism has been retroactively described as form of egoism
- Dmitry Ivanovich Pisarev, a Russian literary critic and philosopher of nihilism and rational egoism
- Ayn Rand, who supported an egoistic model of capitalist self-incentive and selfishness
- Benjamin Tucker, an American egoist anarchist
- James L. Walker, who independently formulated an egoist philosophy before himself discovering the work of Stirner

== Relation to altruism ==
In 1851, French philosopher Auguste Comte coined the term altruism (French: altruisme; from Italian altrui, from Latin alteri 'others') as an antonym for egoism. In this sense, altruism defined Comte's position that all self-regard must be replaced with only the regard for others.

While Friedrich Nietzsche does not view altruism as a suitable antonym for egoism, Comte instead states that only two human motivations exist, egoistic and altruistic, and that the two cannot be mediated; that is, one must always predominate the other. For Comte, the total subordination of the self to altruism is a necessary condition to both social and personal benefit. Nietzsche, rather than rejecting the practice of altruism, warns that despite there being neither much altruism nor equality in the world, there is almost universal endorsement of their value and, notoriously, even by those who are its worst enemies in practice. Egoist philosophy commonly views the subordination of the self to altruism as either a form of domination that limits freedom, an unethical or irrational principle, or an extension of some egoistic root cause.

In evolutionary theory, biological altruism is the observed occurrence of an organism acting to the benefit of others at the cost of its own reproductive fitness. While biological egoism does grant that an organism may act to the benefit of others, it describes only such when in accordance with reproductive self-interest. Kin altruism and selfish gene theory are examples of this division. On biological altruism, the Stanford Encyclopedia of Philosophy states: "Contrary to what is often thought, an evolutionary approach to human behaviour does not imply that humans are likely to be motivated by self-interest alone. One strategy by which ‘selfish genes’ may increase their future representation is by causing humans to be non-selfish, in the psychological sense." This is a central topic within contemporary discourse of psychological egoism.

Philosophies of personal identity such as open individualism have implications for egoism and altruism. Daniel Kolak argues that closed individualism, the idea that one's identity consists of a line stretching across time and that a future self exists, is incoherent. Kolak instead argues that personal identity is an illusion, and the "self" doesn't actually exist, similar to the idea of anattā in Buddhist philosophy. Thus, it could be argued that egoism is incoherent, since there is no "self" in the first place. Similar arguments have been made by Derek Parfit in the book Reasons and Persons with ideas such as the teletransportation paradox.

== Relation to nihilism ==
The history of egoist thought has often overlapped with that of nihilism. For example, Max Stirner's rejection of absolutes and abstract concepts often places him among the first philosophical nihilists. The popular description of Stirner as a moral nihilist, however, may fail to encapsulate certain subtleties of his ethical thought. The Stanford Encyclopedia of Philosophy states, "Stirner is clearly committed to the non-nihilistic view that certain kinds of character and modes of behaviour (namely autonomous individuals and actions) are to be valued above all others. His conception of morality is, in this respect, a narrow one, and his rejection of the legitimacy of moral claims is not to be confused with a denial of the propriety of all normative or ethical judgement." Stirner's nihilism may instead be understood as cosmic nihilism. Likewise, both normative and descriptive theories of egoism further developed under Russian nihilism, shortly giving birth to rational egoism. Nihilist philosophers Dmitry Pisarev and Nikolay Chernyshevsky were influential in this regard, compounding such forms of egoism with hard determinism.

Max Stirner's philosophy strongly rejects modernity and is highly critical of the increasing dogmatism and oppressive social institutions that embody it. In order that it might be surpassed, egoist principles are upheld as a necessary advancement beyond the modern world. The Stanford Encyclopedia states that Stirner's historical analyses serve to "undermine historical narratives which portray the modern development of humankind as the progressive realisation of freedom, but also to support an account of individuals in the modern world as increasingly oppressed". This critique of humanist discourses especially has linked Stirner to more contemporary poststructuralist thought.

== Political egoism ==
Since normative egoism rejects the moral obligation to subordinate the ego to society-at-large or to a ruling class, it may be predisposed to certain political implications. The Internet Encyclopedia of Philosophy states:

Egoists ironically can be read as moral and political egalitarians glorifying the dignity of each and every person to pursue life as they see fit. Mistakes in securing the proper means and appropriate ends will be made by individuals, but if they are morally responsible for their actions they not only will bear the consequences but also the opportunity for adapting and learning.

In contrast with this however, such an ethic may not morally obligate against the egoistic exercise of power over others. On these grounds, Friedrich Nietzsche criticizes egalitarian morality and political projects as unconducive to the development of human excellence. Max Stirner's own conception, the union of egoists as detailed in his work The Ego and Its Own, saw a proposed form of societal relations whereby limitations on egoistic action are rejected. When posthumously adopted by the anarchist movement, this became the foundation for egoist anarchism.

Stirner's variant of property theory is similarly dialectical, where the concept of ownership is only that personal distinction made between what is one's property and what is not. Consequentially, it is the exercise of control over property which constitutes the nonabstract possession of it. In contrast to this, Ayn Rand incorporates capitalist property rights into her egoist theory.

=== Revolutionary politics ===
Egoist philosopher Nikolai Gavrilovich Chernyshevskii was the dominant intellectual figure behind the 1860–1917 revolutionary movement in Russia, which resulted in the assassination of Tsar Alexander II, eight years before his death in 1889. Dmitry Pisarev was a similarly radical influence within the movement, though he did not personally advocate political revolution.

Philosophical egoism has also found wide appeal among anarchist revolutionaries and thinkers, such as John Henry Mackay, Benjamin Tucker, Émile Armand, Han Ryner Gérard de Lacaze-Duthiers, Renzo Novatore, Miguel Giménez Igualada, and Lev Chernyi. Though he did not involve in any revolutionary movements himself, the entire school of individualist anarchism owes much of its intellectual heritage to Max Stirner.

Egoist philosophy may be misrepresented as a principally revolutionary field of thought. However, neither Hobbesian nor Nietzschean theories of egoism approve of political revolution. Anarchism and revolutionary socialism were also strongly rejected by Ayn Rand and her followers.

=== Fascism ===
The philosophies of both Nietzsche and Stirner were heavily appropriated (or possibly expropriated) by fascist and proto-fascist ideologies. Nietzsche in particular has infamously been represented as a predecessor to Nazism and a substantial academic effort was necessary to disassociate his ideas from their aforementioned appropriation.

At first sight, Nazi totalitarianism may seem the opposite of Stirner's radical individualism. But fascism was above all an attempt to dissolve the social ties created by history and replace them by artificial bonds among individuals who were expected to render explicit obedience to the state on grounds of absolute egoism. Fascist education combined the tenets of asocial egoism and unquestioning conformism, the latter being the means by which the individual secured his own niche in the system. Stirner's philosophy has nothing to say against conformism, it only objects to the Ego being subordinated to any higher principle: the egoist is free to adjust to the world if it is clear he will better himself by doing so. His 'rebellion' may take the form of utter servility if it will further his interest; what he must not do is to be bound by 'general' values or myths of humanity. The totalitarian ideal of a barrack-like society from which all real, historical ties have been eliminated is perfectly consistent with Stirner's principles: the egoist, by his very nature, must be prepared to fight under any flag that suits his convenience.

— Leszek Kołakowski, Main Currents of Marxism, pp.137-138

== See also ==
- Altruism – Concern for the well-being of others
- Enlightened self-interest – Ethical philosophy
- Homo economicus – Model of humans as rational, self-interested agents
- Individualism – Political and social philosophy emphasizing the individual
- Individualist anarchism – Branch of anarchism that emphasizes the individual and their will
- Machiavellianism (psychology) – Personality construct
- Selfishness – Concern for self above that of others
- Selfism – Concern for self above that of others
- Suitheism – Glorification of a subject to divine level
