= Der Einzige =

German anarchist magazine, 1919 to 1925

Der Einzige is the title of a German egoist anarchist magazine, which appeared in 1919, as a weekly, then sporadically until 1925. It was edited by Anselm Ruest (anagramic pseud. for Ernst Samuel), and co-edited, in the first year, by Mynona (pseud. for Salomo Friedlaender), who was his uncle. Its title was adopted from the book Der Einzige und sein Eigentum (engl. trans. The Ego and Its Own) by Max Stirner. Another influence was the thought of German philosopher Friedrich Nietzsche. The publication was connected to the local expressionist artistic current and the transition from it towards dada.

Its contributors included Iwan Bloch, Stefan George, Raoul Hausmann, Paul Scheerbart and others.
