= Egoist anarchism =

School of anarchist thought

Egoist anarchism or anarcho-egoism, often shortened to egoism, is a school of anarchist thought that originated in the philosophy of Max Stirner, a 19th-century German philosopher whose "name appears with familiar regularity in historically orientated surveys of anarchist thought as one of the earliest and best known exponents of individualist anarchism". Egoist anarchism places the individual at the forefront, crafting ethical standards and actions based on this premise. It advocates personal liberation and rejects all subordination, emphasizing the absolute priority of self-interest.

== Max Stirner and his philosophy ==
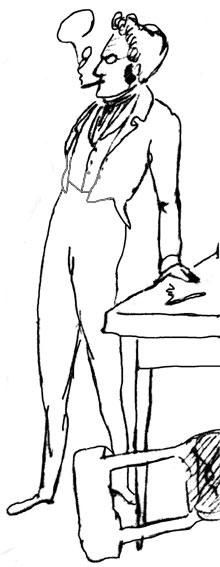
Reconstructed portrait of Max Stirner by Friedrich Engels

Max Stirner's philosophy is usually called "egoism". He says that the egoist rejects pursuit of devotion to "a great idea, a good cause, a doctrine, a system, a lofty calling", saying that the egoist has no political calling, but rather "lives themselves out" without regard to "how well or ill humanity may fare thereby". Stirner held that the only limitation on the rights of the individual is one's power to obtain what they desire. He proposes that most commonly accepted social institutions—including the notion of State, property as a right, natural rights in general and the very notion of society—were mere phantasms or "spooks" in the mind. Stirner wanted to "abolish not only the state but also society as an institution responsible for its members".

Max Stirner's idea of the union of egoists (German: Verein von Egoisten) was first expounded in The Ego and Its Own. The union is understood as a non-systematic association, which Stirner proposed in contradistinction to the state. The union is understood as a relation between egoists which is continually renewed by all parties' support through an act of will. The union requires that all parties participate out of a conscious egoism. If one party silently finds themselves to be suffering, but puts up and keeps the appearance, the union has degenerated into something else. This union is not seen as an authority above a person's own will. This idea has received interpretations for politics, economics, romance and sex.

Stirner claimed that property comes about through might: "I do not step shyly back from your property, but look upon it always as my property, in which I respect nothing. Pray do the like with what you call my property! [...] What I have in my power, that is my own. So long as I assert myself as holder, I am the proprietor of the thing; [...]. Whoever knows how to take, to defend, the thing, to him belongs property". His concept of "egoistic property" not only rejects moral restraint on how one obtains and uses things, but includes other people as well.

== Influence and expansion ==
=== Early development ===
==== Europe ====
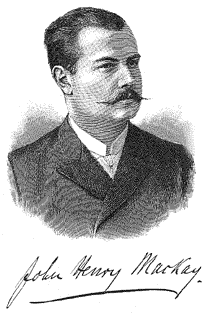
John Henry Mackay, early anarchist propagandizer of Stirner's philosophy

The Scottish-born German writer John Henry Mackay found out about Stirner while reading a copy of Friedrich Albert Lange's History of Materialism and Critique of Its Present Importance. Mackay later looked for a copy of The Ego and Its Own and after being fascinated with it wrote a biography of Stirner (Max Stirner – sein Leben und sein Werk), published in German in 1898. Mackay's propaganda of Stirnerist egoism and of male homosexual and bisexual rights influenced Adolf Brand who in 1896 published the world's first ongoing homosexual publication, Der Eigene. The name of that publication was taken from Stirner—who had greatly influenced the young Brand—and refers to Stirner's concept of "self-ownership" of the individual. Der Eigene concentrated on cultural and scholarly material and may have averaged around 1500 subscribers per issue during its lifetime. Benjamin Tucker followed this journal from the United States.

Another later German anarchist publication influenced deeply by Stirner was Der Einzige. It appeared in 1919 as a weekly, then sporadically until 1925 and was edited by cousins Anselm Ruest (pseudonym for Ernst Samuel) and Mynona (pseudonym for Salomo Friedlaender). Its title was adopted from the book Der Einzige und sein Eigentum (The Ego and Its Own) by Max Stirner. Another influence was the thought of German philosopher Friedrich Nietzsche. The publication was connected to the local expressionist artistic current and the transition from it towards dada.

Stirner's influence also expressed itself in a different way in Spanish and French individualist anarchism: "The theoretical positions and the vital experiences of French individualism are deeply iconoclastic and scandalous, even within libertarian circles. The call of nudist naturism (see anarcho-naturism), the strong defense of birth control methods, the idea of "unions of egoists" with the sole justification of sexual practices, that will try to put in practice, not without difficulties, will establish a way of thought and action, and will result in sympathy within some, and a strong rejection within others".

=== Illegalism ===
Illegalism was an anarchist practice that developed primarily in France, Italy, Belgium and Switzerland during the early 1900s that found justification in Stirner's philosophy. The illegalists openly embraced criminality as a lifestyle. Illegalists usually did not seek moral basis for their actions, recognizing only the reality of "might" rather than "right". For the most part, illegal acts were done simply to satisfy personal desires and needs, not for some greater ideal.

As a reaction to this, French anarchist communists attempted to distance themselves from illegalism and anarchist individualism as a whole. In August 1913, the Fédération Communiste-Anarchistes (FCA) condemned individualism as bourgeois and more in keeping with capitalism than communism. An article believed to have been written by Peter Kropotkin in the British anarchist paper Freedom argued: "Simple-minded young comrades were often led away by the illegalists' apparent anarchist logic; outsiders simply felt disgusted with anarchist ideas and definitely stopped their ears to any propaganda".

==== United States and United Kingdom ====
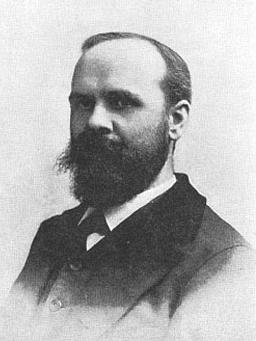
Benjamin Tucker, who abandoned natural rights positions and converted to Stirner's egoist anarchism

Some American individualist anarchists such as Benjamin Tucker abandoned natural rights positions and converted to Max Stirner's egoist anarchism. Rejecting the idea of moral rights, Tucker said that there were only two rights, "the right of might" and "the right of contract". He also said after converting to egoist individualism: "In times past...it was my habit to talk glibly of the right of man to land. It was a bad habit, and I long ago sloughed it off....Man's only right to land is his might over it". In adopting Stirnerite egoism, Tucker rejected natural rights which had long been considered the foundation of his beliefs. This rejection galvanized the movement into fierce debates, with the natural rights proponents accusing the egoists of destroying individualist anarchism itself. So bitter was the conflict that a number of natural rights proponents withdrew from the pages of Liberty in protest even though they had hitherto been among its frequent contributors. Thereafter, Liberty championed egoism although its general content did not change significantly.

Several periodicals were undoubtedly influenced by Liberty's presentation of egoism. They included the following: I published by Clarence Lee Swartz, edited by William Walstein Gordak and J. William Lloyd (all associates of Liberty); and The Ego and The Egoist, both of which were edited by Edward H. Fulton. Among the egoist papers that Tucker followed were the German Der Eigene, edited by Adolf Brand; and The Eagle and The Serpent, issued from London. The latter, the most prominent English language egoist journal, was published from 1898 to 1900 with the subtitle A Journal of Egoistic Philosophy and Sociology.

American anarchists who adhered to egoism include Benjamin Tucker, John Beverley Robinson, Steven T. Byington, Hutchins Hapgood, James L. Walker, Victor Yarros and Edward H. Fulton. John Beverley Robinson wrote an essay called "Egoism" in which he states: "Modern egoism, as propounded by Stirner and Nietzsche, and expounded by Ibsen, Shaw and others, is all these; but it is more. It is the realization by the individual that they are an individual; that, as far as they are concerned, they are the only individual". Steven T. Byington was a one-time proponent of Georgism who later converted to egoist Stirnerist positions after associating with Benjamin Tucker. He is known for translating two important anarchist works into English from German: Stirner's The Ego and Its Own and Paul Eltzbacher's Anarchism: Exponents of the Anarchist Philosophy (also published by Dover with the title The Great Anarchists: Ideas and Teachings of Seven Major Thinkers).

James L. Walker (sometimes known by the pen name Tak Kak) was one of the main contributors to Benjamin Tucker's Liberty. He published his major philosophical work called Philosophy of Egoism in the May 1890 to September 1891 in issues of the publication Egoism. James L. Walker published the work The Philosophy of Egoism in which he argued that egoism "implies a rethinking of the self-other relationship, nothing less than "a complete revolution in the relations of mankind" that avoids both the "archist" principle that legitimates domination and the "moralist" notion that elevates self-renunciation to a virtue. Walker describes himself as an "egoistic anarchist" who believed in both contract and cooperation as practical principles to guide everyday interactions". For Walker, the egoist rejects notions of duty and is indifferent to the hardships of the oppressed whose consent to their oppression enslaves not only them, but those who do not consent. The egoist comes to self-consciousness, not for the God's sake, not for humanity's sake, but for his or her own sake. For him, "[c]ooperation and reciprocity are possible only among those who are unwilling to appeal to fixed patterns of justice in human relationships and instead focus on a form of reciprocity, a union of egoists, in which person each finds pleasure and fulfillment in doing things for others". Walker thought that "what really defines egoism is not mere self-interest, pleasure, or greed; it is the sovereignty of the individual, the full expression of the subjectivity of the individual ego".

Friedrich Nietzsche (see anarchism and Friedrich Nietzsche) and Stirner were frequently compared by French "literary anarchists" and anarchist interpretations of Nietzschean ideas appear to have also been influential in the United States. One researcher notes: "Indeed, translations of Nietzsche's writings in the United States very likely appeared first in Liberty, the anarchist journal edited by Benjamin Tucker". He adds that "Tucker preferred the strategy of exploiting his writings, but proceeding with due caution: 'Nietzsche says splendid things, – often, indeed, Anarchist things, – but he is no Anarchist. It is of the Anarchists, then, to intellectually exploit this would-be exploiter. He may be utilized profitably, but not prophetably'".

=== Mid-20th century ===
In the 1960s, the French anarcho-communist Daniel Guérin said in Anarchism: From Theory to Practice that Stirner "rehabilitated the individual at a time when the philosophical field was dominated by Hegelian anti-individualism and most reformers in the social field had been led by the misdeeds of bourgeois egotism to stress its opposite" and pointed to "the boldness and scope of his thought".

==== Existentialist anarchism ====
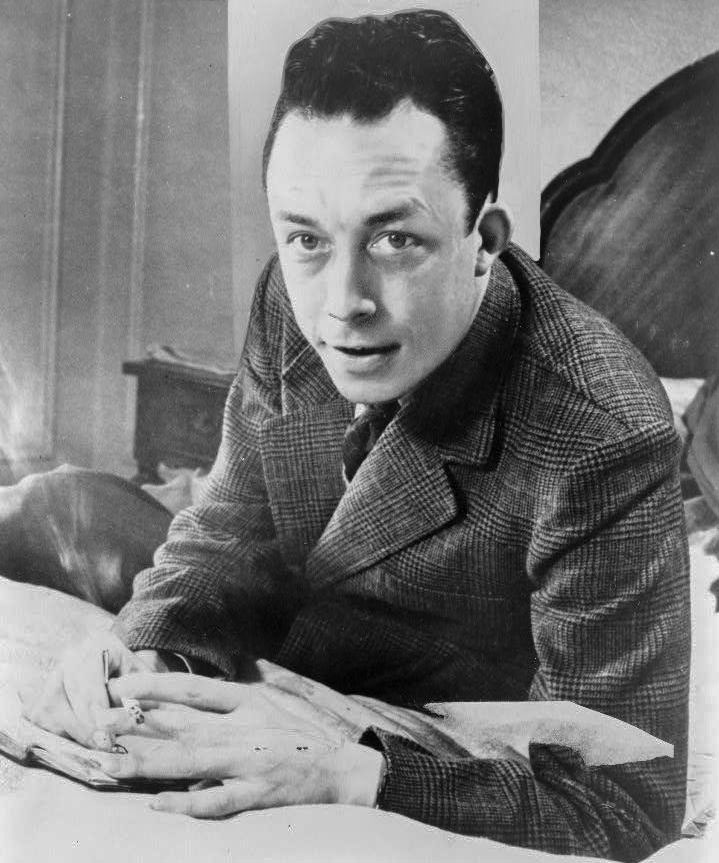
Albert Camus, who devoted a section of The Rebel to Stirner

In the United Kingdom, Herbert Read was influenced highly by egoism as he later came close to existentialism. In Herbert Read Reassessed David Goodway writes that in Read's Education Through Art (1943): "Here we have the egoism of Max Stirner assimilated in the anarchist communism of Peter Kropotkin". He cites Read for this affirmation which shows egoism's influence:

Uniqueness has no practical value in isolation. One of the most certain lessons of modern psychology and of recent historical experiences, is that education must be a process, not only of individuation, but also of integration, which is the reconciliation of individual uniqueness with social unity [...] the individual will be "good" in the degree that his individuality is realized within the organic wholeness of the community.

== See also ==
- Anarchism and Friedrich Nietzsche
- Ethical egoism
- Fascism
- Individualist anarchism
- Objectivism

== Works cited ==
- Welsh, John F. (September 23, 2010). Max Stirner's Dialectical Egoism: A New Interpretation. Lexington Books. ISBN 978-0739141557.
- Parry, Richard (1987). The Bonnot Gang. London: Rebel Press. ISBN 978-0-946061-04-4.
