= The Ego and Its Own =

1844 book by Max Stirner

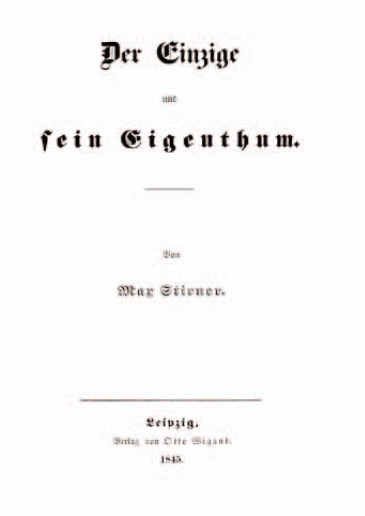
The Unique and Its Property

The Ego and Its Own (German: Der Einzige und sein Eigentum), also known as The Unique and Its Property, is an 1844 book by German philosopher Max Stirner. It presents a post-Hegelian critique of Christianity and traditional morality on one hand; and on the other, humanism, utilitarianism, liberalism, and much of the then-burgeoning socialist movement, advocating instead an amoral (although importantly not inherently immoral or antisocial) egoism. It is considered a major influence on the development of anarchism, existentialism, nihilism, and postmodernism.

== Content ==
The material that follows is based on the first known English translation, by Steven T. Byington, first published in 1907.

=== Part One ===
The first part of the text begins by setting out a tripartite dialectical structure based on an individual's stages of life (Childhood, Youth and Adulthood).

In the first realistic stage, children are restricted by external material forces. Upon reaching the stage of youth, they begin to learn how to overcome these restrictions by what Stirner calls the "self-discovery of mind". However, in the idealistic stage, a youth now becomes enslaved by internal forces such as conscience, reason and other "spooks" or "fixed ideas" of the mind (including religion, nationalism and other ideologies). The final stage, "egoism", is the second self-discovery, in which one becomes self-conscious of oneself as more than his mind or body.

Throughout the book, Stirner applies this dialectical structure to human history. Part one is a sustained critique of the first two periods of human history and especially of the failure of the modern world to escape from religious modes of thinking. Stirner's analysis is opposed to the belief that modern individuals are progressively more free than their predecessors. Stirner sees moderns as being possessed by ideological forces such as Christianity and the ideologies of the modern nation state.

Stirner's critique of modernity is centred on the Protestant Reformation. According to Stirner, Reformation theology extended religious domination over individuals by blurring the distinction between the sensual and the spiritual (thus allowing priests to marry for example). The Reformation also strengthened and intensified religious belief and made it more personal, creating an internal conflict between natural desires and religious conscience. Thus the Reformation only served to further enslave Europeans under spiritual ideology.

Stirner's critique of a progressive view of history is part of his attack on the philosophies of the left-Hegelians, especially that of Ludwig Feuerbach. Stirner sees Feuerbach's philosophy as merely a continuation of religious ways of thinking. Feuerbach had argued that Christianity was mistaken in taking human qualities and projecting them into a transcendent God. But according to Stirner, Feuerbach's philosophy, while rejecting a God, left the Christian qualities intact. Feuerbach had taken a set of human qualities and deified them, making them the only prescriptive view of humanity. This became just another religion for Stirner, a "change of masters" over the individual. Stirner criticizes other left-Hegelians for setting a conception of essential human nature as a goal to be striven for instead of one which is already achieved. So while liberals like Arnold Ruge found the essence of the human in citizenship, and social liberals like Moses Hess found it in labor, all of them made a similar error of ossifying an "essence" of the human and deifying it. For Stirner, "human nature" cannot provide any prescriptions on how one ought to live as one doesn't need to become his nature, but instead he already is ("Your nature is, once and for all, a human one; you are human natures, human beings. But, just because you already are so, you do not still need to become so").

=== Part Two ===
Part two is centered on the possibility of freedom from current ideological ways of thinking through a robust philosophical egoism. Stirner's egoism is centered on what he calls Eigenheit ('Ownness' or autonomy). This 'Ownness' is a feature of a more advanced stage of human personal and historical development. It is the groundwork for our world-view.

Stirner's Egoism is a descriptive psychological egoist, though he differentiates between conscious and involuntary egoism. Stirner does not advocate narrow selfishness of a "sensual man":

Selfishness [...] in the Christian sense, means something like this: I look only to see whether anything is of use to me as a sensual man. But is sensuality then the whole of my ownness? Am I in my own senses when I am given up to sensuality?

Stirner's conception of Ownness is a type of self-description:

Ownness includes in itself everything own, and brings to honor again what Christian language dishonored. But ownness has not any alien standard either, as it is not in any sense an idea like freedom, morality, humanity, etc.: it is only a description of the — owner.

In Part II, Stirner discards the concept of freedom, as being of limited value, and replaces it with power and property. In Chapter "My Power", Stirner explores the concept of human rights and their subsequent inherent separation from the self: "The right of 'all' is to go before my right."

In the chapter "My Self-Enjoyment" Stirner discusses longing and "true life", discarding both of them preferring a "non-seeking" man: "Not till I am certain of myself, and no longer seeking for myself, am I really my property; I have myself, therefore I use and enjoy myself." "A man is 'called' to nothing, and has no 'calling', no 'destiny', as little as a plant or a beast has a 'calling'". Further he argues that "[t]he true man does not lie in the future, an object of longing, but lies, existent and real, in the present".

In Part III of Part II, "The Unique One", Stirner gives a summary of the book and its ideas, and ends it as it began: "all things are nothing to me".

== Style and structure ==
Stirner repeatedly quotes Johann Wolfgang von Goethe, Friedrich Schiller and Bruno Bauer assuming that readers will be familiar with their works. He also paraphrases and makes word-plays and in-jokes on formulations found in Hegel's works as well as in the works of his contemporaries such as Ludwig Feuerbach. This can make the book more demanding for contemporary readers.

== Reception and influence ==
Initially, The Unique and Its Property received much attention, though most reviews were negative critiques by left Hegelians such as Ludwig Feuerbach and Moses Hess. Feuerbach's critique, "The Essence of Christianity in Relation to The Ego and Its Own", called the work "ingenious" and "intelligent" but also criticizes it as "eccentric, one-sided and falsely defined". Stirner responded to these critiques in an 1845 essay titled "Stirner's Critics".

The Unique and Its Property also had a profound impact on Marx and Engels. In 1844 Engels sent a letter to Marx praising "the noble Stirner" and suggesting that his dialectical egoism can serve as a point of departure for communism:

It is certainly true that we must first make a cause our own, egoistic cause, before we can do anything to further it. . . . [W]e are communists out of egoism also, and it is out of egoism that we wish to be human beings, not mere individuals...

However, Marx and Engels would later collaborate on a lengthy criticism of Stirner's book in The German Ideology (1845, published 1932). The critique is a polemical tirade filled with ad hominem attacks and insults against Stirner (Marx calls him a "petty bourgeois individualist intellectual").

The argument in The German Ideology critiquing The Unique and Its Property is that Stirner's central concept is the same kind of "ghost" that Stirner argues does not exist. For Marx and Engels, Stirner's "egoism" simply presented a modern religiosity that, according to L. Dallman, "stands in a privileged relationship to non-conceptual reality". Marx and Engels would therefore derisively and repetitively refer to Stirner as "Saint Max".

Stirner also had a lasting influence in the tradition of individualist anarchism. American individualist Benjamin R. Tucker, editor of the journal Liberty, adopted Stirner's egoism in 1886 while rejecting conceptions of natural rights. This led to a bitter split in American individualist anarchism between egoists such as James L. Walker and John Beverly Robinson, and the proponents of natural rights anarchism such as that of Lysander Spooner. Other individualist anarchists influenced by Stirner include Lev Chernyi, Adolf Brand, Renzo Novatore, John Henry Mackay, Enrico Arrigoni, Miguel Giménez Igualada, and Émile Armand.

Although initially influenced by American individualist anarchist, S.E.P. was influenced more by European individualists and eventually by Dora Marsden, which led to him discarding anarchism, as did Dora Marsden some 70 years before him, which would go on to influence others associated with him. Other egoists who rejected anarchism include Stephen Marletta, William J. Boyer, Ragnar Redbeard, Malfew Seklew and Svein Olav Nyberg, among others.

Recently, Stirner has been an influential source for post-left anarchist thinkers such as Jason McQuinn, Bob Black and Hakim Bey.

== Publication attempts ==
He who destroyes a good Booke, kills reason it selfe, a 1955 exhibition by University of Kansas Library, noted the following regarding the book's initial publication:

Its frank espousal of anarchistic egoism led to the not unexpected announcement in the newspapers of Saxony that the book had been immediately confiscated in Leipzig. Anxious not to be outdone, where usually they were so far ahead, Prussia banned the book. Then, Berlin received more accurate news: the book had not been banned in Saxony at all. In fact, the book's farfetched overstatement was regarded at Dresden as its own best antidote. The small states of Germany fell into line, on one side or the other, often with considerable difficulty owing to the scarcity of copies to examine first.

== See also ==
- Geschichte des Materialismus
- Solipsism
