= Miguel Giménez Igualada =

Spanish anarchist (1888–1973)

- Born: Miguel Ramos Giménez; 26 January 1888; Iniesta, Andalucia, Spain
- Died: 26 November 1973 (aged 85); Mexico
- Movement: Individualist anarchism

Miguel Ramos Giménez (1888–1973), commonly known by his pseudonym Miguel Giménez Igualada, was a Spanish individualist anarchist writer.

== Life ==
Miguel Ramos Giménez was born in the Andalucian city of Iniesta, on 26 January 1888. He worked several different jobs throughout his life, including as a street vendor, taxi driver and even as a manager of a sugar plantation. In his youth, he joined an illegalist group and took the pseudonym of Miguel Giménez Igualada. He also taught at the Las Ventas Libertarian Atheneum in Madrid.

A follower of the philosophy of Max Stirner, Giménez Igualada became a leading voice of individualist anarchism in Spain. In 1932, he published a Spanish language edition of Stirner's book The Ego and Its Own. He was also a pacifist, committed to non-violence. He also founded the Federation of Individualist Anarchist Associations and contributed to its newspaper Al Margen. The outbreak of the Spanish Civil War caught him in Madrid. He subsequently moved to Barcelona, where he became a director at the People's Theatre. Together with playwright Rodolfo González Pacheco, he edited the individualist magazine Nosotros, publishing five issues between October 1937 and February 1938. It ceased publication after the Aragon Offensive cut the Republican sector in half.

At 15:00, on 10 February 1939, Giménez Igualada crossed over the border into France and was detained in an internment camp. While in Argelers concentration camp, the French authorities began pressuring the internees to return to Spain; he reported that everyone in the camp refused, which built solidarity between the internees. Fearing that he would be forced back to Spain, he kept a razor blade with him at all times, intending to kill himself if he was taken to the Spanish border. He was later transferred to the internment camp in Bram. He also collected all his manuscripts together and buried them where he slept, later recovering them so he could write a book about life in the camps.

He emigrated to Latin America, moving first to Argentina, then Uruguay, before finally settling in Mexico. There, in 1946, he published the memoir Más allá del dolor. During the 1950s, he became involved in Freemasonry. He spent much of the rest of his life writing for numerous different publications of Spanish exiles. From 1953 to 1963, he wrote a number of articles for the magazine España Libre, in which he promoted traditional gender roles and the subordination of women to men, describing his ideal of women as "daughters, loyal to their parents; women, loyal to their husbands; mothers, loyal to their children". He died in Mexico on 26 November 1973.

== Works ==
- Dolor, 1944
- Más allá del dolor, 1946
- Lobos en España, 1946
- Un atentado, Los caminos del hombre, 1961
- Anarquismo, 1968
- El niño y la escuela, Salmos, Stirner, 1968
- Trilogía de oratoria, 1968

== See also ==
- List of peace activists

== Bibliography ==
- Cate-Arries, Francie (2004). Spanish Culture Behind Barbed Wire: Memory and Representation of the French Concentration Camps, 1939-1945. Bucknell University Press. ISBN 9780838755464.
- Díez, Xavier (2006). "La insumisión voluntaria. El anarquismo individualista durante la Dictadura y la Segunda República (1923-1938)" (PDF). Germinal (in Spanish) (1). Archived from the original (PDF) on 23 July 2011.
- Dupuy, Rolf (14 February 2026) [7 August 2007]. "GIMÉNEZ IGUALADA, Miguel". Dictionnaire International des Militants Anarchistes (in French).
- Feu, Montse (2012). "Transnational Working-Class Women's Activism in New York's Confederated Hispanic Societies (1939–1977)". In Tibe Bonifacio, Glenda (ed.). Feminism and Migration. International Perspectives on Migration. Vol. 1. Dordrecht: Springer. pp. 187–207. doi:10.1007/978-94-007-2831-8_10. ISBN 978-94-007-2830-1.
- Íñiguez, Miguel (2001). "Giménez Igualada, Miguel". Esbozo de una enciclopedia histórica del anarquismo español (in Spanish). Madrid: Fundación de Estudios Libertarios Anselmo Lorenzo. p. 287. ISBN 9788486864453. OCLC 807322760.
