= Natural rights and legal rights =

Philosophical and political rights

Some philosophers distinguish two types of rights, natural rights and legal rights.

- Natural rights are the subset of moral rights that human beings possess as a result of their nature, independent of the laws or customs of any particular society. Natural law is the law of natural rights.
- Legal rights are those bestowed onto a person by a given legal system (they can be modified, repealed, and restrained by human laws). The concept of positive law is related to the concept of legal rights.

Natural rights are universal, fundamental, and according to some philosophers categorically inalienable: i.e. they cannot be repealed by human laws, though one can forfeit their enjoyment through one's actions, such as by violating someone else's rights. In contrast, Legal rights are particular and are not categorically or necessarily fundamental or inalienable.

Natural law first appeared in ancient Greek philosophy, and was referred to by Roman philosopher Cicero. It was subsequently alluded to by Saint Paul, and then developed in the Middle Ages by Catholic philosophers such as Albert the Great, his pupil Thomas Aquinas, and Jean Gerson in his 1402 work "De Vita Spirituali Animae." During the Age of Enlightenment, the concept of natural laws was used to challenge the divine right of kings, and became an alternative justification for the establishment of a social contract, positive law, and government – and thus legal rights – in the form of classical republicanism. Conversely, the concept of natural rights is used by others to challenge the legitimacy of all such establishments.

The idea of human rights derives from theories of natural rights. Those rejecting a distinction between human rights and natural rights view human rights as the successor that is not dependent on natural law, natural theology, or Christian theological doctrine. Natural rights, in particular, are considered beyond the authority of any government or international body to dismiss. The 1948 United Nations Universal Declaration of Human Rights is an important statement of natural rights, but not legally binding on any member state unless its provisions are adopted into that state's laws.

Natural rights were traditionally viewed as exclusively negative rights, whereas human rights also comprise positive rights. Even on a natural rights conception of human rights, the two terms may not be synonymous.

Iusnaturalism, particularly, holds that legal norms follow a human universal knowledge. Thus, it views enacted laws that contradict such universal knowledge as unjust and illegitimate, but some jusnaturalists might attribute the source of natural law to a natural order instead of a divine mandate.

The concept of natural rights is not universally accepted, partly due to its religious associations and perceived incoherence. Some philosophers argue that natural rights do not exist and that legal rights are the only rights; for instance, Jeremy Bentham called natural rights "simple nonsense".

== History ==
Legal rights are rights defined, conferred, and enforced by the positive laws and institutions of particular legal systems. Their history is therefore the history of how societies across the world have created, used, and enforced written codes, constitutions, bills, charters, and the like. This particular history dates back at least to 2100-2050 BCE, with the writing of the ancient Mesopotamian Code of Ur-Nammu.

On the other hand, the idea that certain rights are natural or inalienable has a shorter history dating back at least to the Stoics (c. 300 BCE - 300 CE) of late Antiquity, through Catholic law of the early Middle Ages, and descending through the Protestant Reformation and the Age of Enlightenment to today.

The existence of natural rights has been asserted by different individuals on different premises, such as a priori philosophical reasoning or religious principles. For example, Immanuel Kant claimed to derive natural rights through reason alone. The United States Declaration of Independence, meanwhile, is based upon the "self-evident" truth that "all men are ... endowed by their Creator with certain unalienable Rights".

Likewise, different philosophers and statespersons have designed different lists of what they believe to be natural rights; almost all include the right to life and liberty as the two highest priorities. H. L. A. Hart argued that if there are any rights at all, there must be the right to liberty, for all the others would depend upon this. T. H. Green argued that "if there are such things as rights at all, then, there must be a right to life and liberty, or, to put it more properly to free life." John Locke emphasized "life, liberty and property" as primary. However, despite Locke's influential defense of the right of revolution, Thomas Jefferson substituted "pursuit of happiness" in place of "property" in the United States Declaration of Independence.

=== Ancient ===
A prevailing view in historical scholarship was that there was no conception of "rights" in the ancient world. This view was captured by Alasdair MacIntyre, who wrote, "there is no expression in any ancient or medieval language correctly translated by our expression ‘a right’ until near the close of the Middle Ages: the concept lacks any means of expression in Hebrew, Greek, Latin or Arabic, classical or medieval, before about 1400," adding that if even such rights existed, "no one could have known that there were." Similarly, Benjamin Constant stated, "The ancients … had no conception of individual rights."

However, more recent scholarship has challenged notions that rights did not exist in the ancient world.

==== Ancient near east ====
The oldest surviving records of legal rights come from the legal codes of ancient Mesopotamia. The rights laid out in these codes were not natural or independent of the authority of the ruler, but rather were granted by the authority of the ruler. Specifically, the Code of Ur-Nammu is the oldest known such code, dating back to around 2100-2050 BCE. The surviving parts address homicide, injury, marriage, and property, often prescribing rights to monetary compensation when individuals were aggrieved by the aforementioned crimes.

Stephen Kinzer, a veteran journalist for The New York Times and the author of the book All The Shah's Men, writes about Zoroastrianism (founded circa 2000 BCE) in the latter:

The Zoroastrian religion taught Iranians that citizens have an inalienable right to enlightened leadership and that the duty of subjects is not simply to obey wise kings but also to rise up against those who are wicked. Leaders are seen as representative of God on earth, but they deserve allegiance only as long as they have farr, a kind of divine blessing that they must earn by moral behavior.

Later codes include the Laws of Lipit-Ishtar and the Laws of Eshnunna. The most complete surviving collection from the time is the Code of Hammurabi, written around 1750 BCE, which contains about 282 specific rules. The prologue presents the king as divinely appointed to administer justice, fight evil, and to prevent the strong from oppressing the weak. The epilogue encourages the wronged to have the laws read so that they know their rights. The code distinguishes between free persons, low-status free persons, and slaves, with legal remedies corresponding to the status of the aggrieved. The code covers property, contracts, debt, family, and professional liability issues. The texts themselves were unlike modern legal codes in that they were not exhaustive and coexisted with customs. Modern scholarly consensus treats the code as operating under a hierarchical, divinely mandated monarchy rather than any sort of universal human rights.

Another ancient example was the Cyrus Cylinder, a baked clay cylinder recording a proclamation by Cyrus the Great of Persia after the 539 BCE conquest of Babylon. Some scholars view the cylinder as an early example of a human rights charter, while others consider it propaganda and little more.

==== Ancient Greece ====
The 40 Principal Doctrines of the Epicureans taught that "in order to obtain protection from other men, any means for attaining this end is a natural good" (PD 6). They believed in a contractarian ethics where mortals agree to not harm or be harmed, and the rules that govern their agreements are not absolute (PD 33), but must change with circumstances (PD 37–38). The Epicurean doctrines imply that humans in their natural state enjoy personal sovereignty and that they must consent to the laws that govern them, and that this consent (and the laws) can be revisited periodically when circumstances change.

The Stoics held that no one was a slave by nature; slavery was an external condition juxtaposed to the internal freedom of the soul (sui juris). Seneca the Younger wrote:

It is a mistake to imagine that slavery pervades a man's whole being; the better part of him is exempt from it: the body indeed is subjected and in the power of a master, but the mind is independent, and indeed is so free and wild, that it cannot be restrained even by this prison of the body, wherein it is confined.

Of fundamental importance to the development of the idea of natural rights was the emergence of the idea of natural human equality. As the historian A.J. Carlyle notes: "There is no change in political theory so startling in its completeness as the change from the theory of Aristotle to the later philosophical view represented by Cicero and Seneca. ... We think that this cannot be better exemplified than with regard to the theory of the equality of human nature." Charles H. McIlwain likewise observes that "the idea of the equality of men is the profoundest contribution of the Stoics to political thought" and that "its greatest influence is in the changed conception of law that in part resulted from it." Cicero argues in De Legibus that "we are born for Justice, and that right is based, not upon opinions, but upon Nature."

=== Modern ===
One of the first Western thinkers to develop the contemporary idea of natural rights was French theologian Jean Gerson, whose 1402 treatise De Vita Spirituali Animae is considered one of the first attempts to develop what would come to be called modern natural rights theory.

The Polish-Lithuanian union made a natural rights case at the Council of Constance (1414–1418), led by Paulus Vladimiri, rector of the Jagiellonian University. He challenged legality of the Teutonic Order's crusade against Lithuania, arguing that the Order could only wage a defensive war if pagans violated the natural rights of the Christians. Vladimiri further stipulated that infidels had rights which had to be respected, and neither the Pope nor the Holy Roman Emperor had the authority to violate them. Lithuanians also brought a group of Samogitian representatives to testify to atrocities committed by the Order.

In the 16th century, the School of Salamanca, led by the Dominican theologian and professor Francisco de Vitoria, further expanded upon earlier natural-rights arguments by applying them to the Spanish conquest of the Americas. In Vitoria's 1539 text "De Indis", he lays out an argument that the indigenous peoples of the Americas were veri domini (the true masters or possessors) of their goods and public affairs, holding legitimate dominium by virtue of their rational human nature, regardless of their lack of belief in Christianity or sins. Vitoria also rejected claims that the natives were natural slaves or that papal donation or imperial primacy justified the theft of their property and usurpation of their self-governance. He and his pupils and associates, such as Domingo de Soto further developed certain aspects of ius gentium into a body of law applying across peoples and nations. Their arguments constituted great strides in the conception of natural rights that constrain political and religious power, and influenced later thinking about both about natural rights and international law.

The Stoic doctrine that the "inner part cannot be delivered into bondage" re-emerged centuries later in the Reformation doctrine of liberty of conscience. In 1523, Martin Luther wrote:

Furthermore, every man is responsible for his own faith, and he must see it for himself that he believes rightly. As little as another can go to hell or heaven for me, so little can he believe or disbelieve for me; and as little as he can open or shut heaven or hell for me, so little can he drive me to faith or unbelief. Since, then, belief or unbelief is a matter of everyone's conscience, and since this is no lessening of the secular power, the latter should be content and attend to its own affairs and permit men to believe one thing or another, as they are able and willing, and constrain no one by force.

==== Enlightenment ====
17th-century English philosopher John Locke discussed natural rights in his work, identifying them as being "life, liberty, and estate (property)", and argued that such fundamental rights could not be surrendered in the social contract. Preservation of the natural rights to life, liberty, and property was claimed as justification for the rebellion of the American colonies. As George Mason stated in his draft for the Virginia Declaration of Rights, "all men are born equally free", and hold "certain inherent natural rights, of which they cannot, by any compact, deprive or divest their posterity." Another 17th-century Englishman, John Lilburne (known as Freeborn John), who came into conflict with both the monarchy of King Charles I and the military dictatorship of Oliver Cromwell, argued for level human basic rights he called "freeborn rights" which he defined as being rights that every human being is born with, as opposed to rights bestowed by government or by human law.

The distinction between alienable and unalienable rights was introduced by Francis Hutcheson. In his Inquiry into the Original of Our Ideas of Beauty and Virtue (1725), Hutcheson foreshadowed the Declaration of Independence, stating: "For wherever any Invasion is made upon unalienable Rights, there must arise either a perfect, or external Right to Resistance. ... Unalienable Rights are essential Limitations in all Governments." Hutcheson, however, placed clear limits on his notion of unalienable rights, declaring that "there can be no Right, or Limitation of Right, inconsistent with, or opposite to the greatest public Good." Hutcheson elaborated on this idea of unalienable rights in his A System of Moral Philosophy (1755), based on the Reformation principle of the liberty of conscience. One could not in fact give up the capacity for private judgment (e.g., about religious questions) regardless of any external contracts or oaths to religious or secular authorities so that right is "unalienable". Hutcheson wrote: "Thus no man can really change his sentiments, judgments, and inward affections, at the pleasure of another; nor can it tend to any good to make him profess what is contrary to his heart. The right of private judgment is therefore unalienable."

In the German Enlightenment, Hegel gave a highly developed treatment of this inalienability argument. Like Hutcheson, Hegel based the theory of inalienable rights on the de facto inalienability of those aspects of personhood that distinguish persons from things. A thing, like a piece of property, can in fact be transferred from one person to another. According to Hegel, the same would not apply to those aspects that make one a person:

The right to what is in essence inalienable is imprescriptible, since the act whereby I take possession of my personality, of my substantive essence, and make myself a responsible being, capable of possessing rights and with a moral and religious life, takes away from these characteristics of mine just that externality which alone made them capable of passing into the possession of someone else. When I have thus annulled their externality, I cannot lose them through lapse of time or from any other reason drawn from my prior consent or willingness to alienate them.

In discussion of social contract theory, "inalienable rights" were said to be those rights that could not be surrendered by citizens to the sovereign. Such rights were thought to be natural rights, independent of positive law. Some social contract theorists reasoned, however, that in the natural state only the strongest could benefit from their rights. Thus, people form an implicit social contract, ceding their natural rights to the authority to protect the people from abuse, and living henceforth under the legal rights of that authority.

Many historical apologies for slavery and illiberal government were based on explicit or implicit voluntary contracts to alienate any "natural rights" to freedom and self-determination. The de facto inalienability arguments of Hutcheson and his predecessors provided the basis for the anti-slavery movement to argue not simply against involuntary slavery but against any explicit or implied contractual forms of slavery. Any contract that tried to legally alienate such a right would be inherently invalid. Similarly, the argument was used by the democratic movement to argue against any explicit or implied social contracts of subjection (pactum subjectionis) by which a people would supposedly alienate their right of self-government to a sovereign as, for example, in Leviathan by Thomas Hobbes. According to Ernst Cassirer,

There is, at least, one right that cannot be ceded or abandoned: the right to personality...They charged the great logician [Hobbes] with a contradiction in terms. If a man could give up his personality he would cease being a moral being. ... There is no pactum subjectionis, no act of submission by which man can give up the state of free agent and enslave himself. For by such an act of renunciation he would give up that very character which constitutes his nature and essence: he would lose his humanity.

These themes converged in the debate about American independence. While Jefferson was writing the Declaration of Independence, Welsh nonconformist Richard Price sided with the colonists' claim that King George III was "attempting to rob them of that liberty to which every member of society and all civil communities have a natural and unalienable title." Price again based the argument on the de facto inalienability of "that principle of spontaneity or self-determination which constitutes us agents or which gives us a command over our actions, rendering them properly ours, and not effects of the operation of any foreign cause." Any social contract or compact allegedly alienating these rights would be non-binding and void, wrote Price:

Neither can any state acquire such an authority over other states in virtue of any compacts or cessions. This is a case in which compacts are not binding. Civil liberty is, in this respect, on the same footing with religious liberty. As no people can lawfully surrender their religious liberty by giving up their right of judging for themselves in religion, or by allowing any human beings to prescribe to them what faith they shall embrace, or what mode of worship they shall practise, so neither can any civil societies lawfully surrender their civil liberty by giving up to any extraneous jurisdiction their power of legislating for themselves and disposing their property.

Price raised a furor of opposition so in 1777 he wrote another tract that clarified his position and again restated the de facto basis for the argument that the "liberty of men as agents is that power of self-determination which all agents, as such, possess." In Intellectual Origins of American Radicalism, Staughton Lynd pulled together these themes and related them to the slavery debate:

Then it turned out to make considerable difference whether one said slavery was wrong because every man has a natural right to the possession of his own body, or because every man has a natural right freely to determine his own destiny. The first kind of right was alienable: thus Locke neatly derived slavery from capture in war, whereby a man forfeited his labor to the conqueror who might lawfully have killed him; and thus Dred Scott was judged permanently to have given up his freedom. But the second kind of right, what Price called "that power of self-determination which all agents, as such, possess," was inalienable as long man remained man. Like the mind's quest for religious truth from which it was derived, self-determination was not a claim to ownership which might be both acquired and surrendered, but an inextricable aspect of the activity of being human.

Meanwhile, in America, Thomas Jefferson "took his division of rights into alienable and unalienable from Hutcheson, who made the distinction popular and important", and in the 1776 United States Declaration of Independence, famously condensed this to:

We hold these truths to be self-evident, that all men are created equal, that they are endowed by their Creator with certain unalienable Rights...

==== Early modern period ====
In the 19th century, the movement to abolish slavery seized this passage as a statement of constitutional principle, although the U.S. constitution recognized and protected the institution of slavery. As a lawyer, future Chief Justice Salmon P. Chase argued before the Supreme Court in the case of John Van Zandt, who had been charged with violating the Fugitive Slave Act, that:

The law of the Creator, which invests every human being with an inalienable title to freedom, cannot be repealed by any interior law which asserts that man is property.

The concept of inalienable rights was criticized by Jeremy Bentham and Edmund Burke as groundless. Bentham and Burke claimed that rights arise from the actions of government, or evolve from tradition, and that neither of these can provide anything inalienable. (See Bentham's "Critique of the Doctrine of Inalienable, Natural Rights", and Burke's Reflections on the Revolution in France). Presaging the shift in thinking in the 19th century, Bentham famously dismissed the idea of natural rights as "nonsense on stilts". By way of contrast to the views of Burke and Bentham, Patriot scholar and justice James Wilson criticized Burke's view as "tyranny".

The signers of the Declaration of Independence deemed it a "self-evident truth" that all men "are endowed by their Creator with certain unalienable Rights". In The Social Contract, Jean-Jacques Rousseau claims that the existence of inalienable rights is unnecessary for the existence of a constitution or a set of laws and rights. This idea of a social contract – that rights and responsibilities are derived from a consensual contract between the government and the people – is the most widely recognized alternative.

One criticism of natural rights theory is that one cannot draw norms from facts. This objection is variously expressed as the is-ought problem, the naturalistic fallacy, or the appeal to nature. G.E. Moore, for example, said that ethical naturalism falls prey to the naturalistic fallacy. Some defenders of natural rights theory, however, counter that the term "natural" in "natural rights" is contrasted with "artificial" rather than referring to nature. John Finnis, for example, contends that natural law and natural rights are derived from self-evident principles, not from speculative principles or from facts.

There is also debate as to whether all rights are either natural or legal. Fourth president of the United States James Madison, while representing Virginia in the House of Representatives, believed that there are rights, such as trial by jury, that are social rights, arising neither from natural law nor from positive law (which are the basis of natural and legal rights respectively) but from the social contract from which a government derives its authority.

==== Thomas Hobbes ====
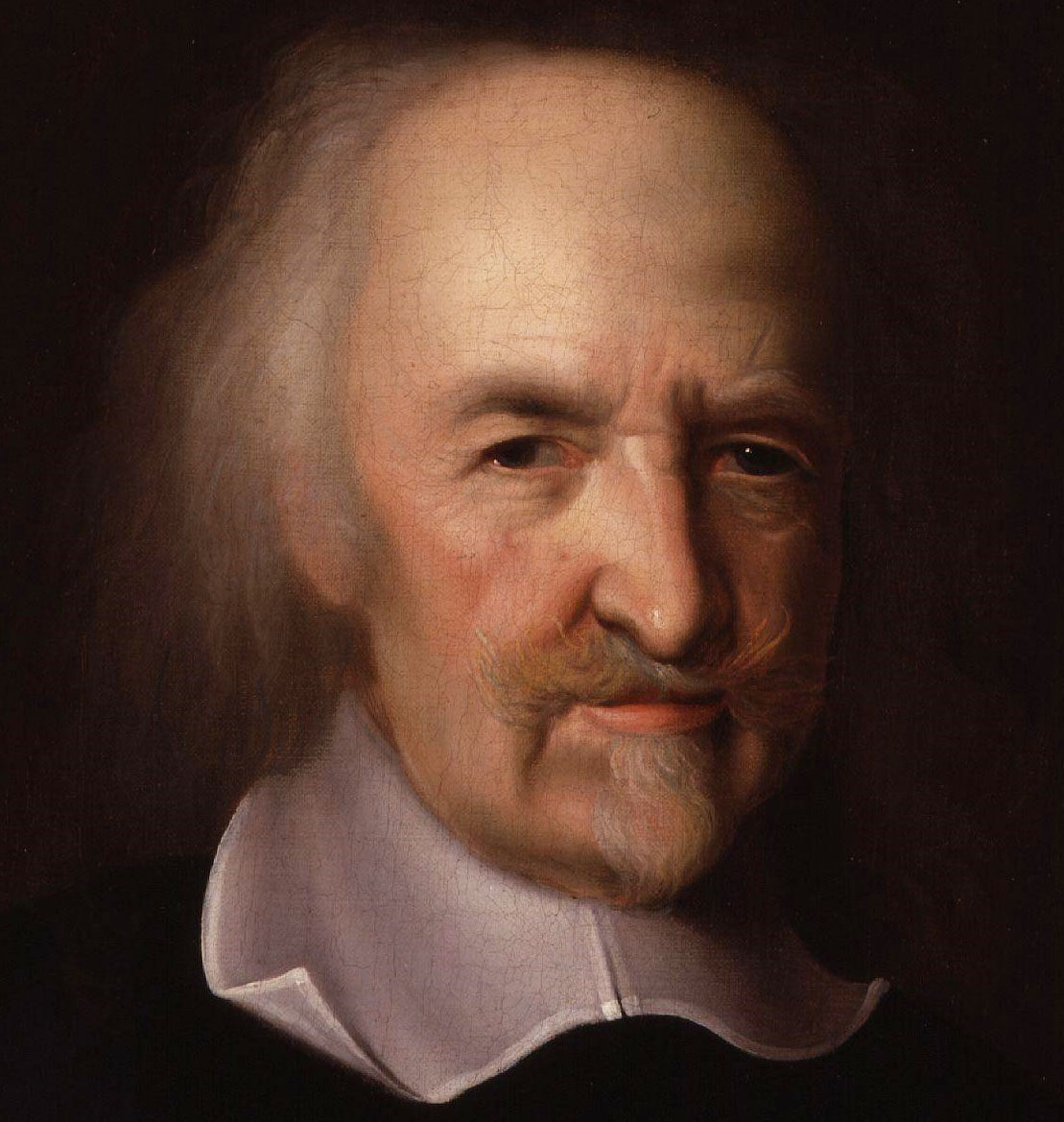
Thomas Hobbes

Thomas Hobbes (1588–1679) included a discussion of natural rights in his moral and political philosophy. Hobbes' conception of natural rights extended from his conception of man in a "state of nature". Thus he argued that the essential natural (human) right was "to use his own power, as he will himself, for the preservation of his own Nature; that is to say, of his own Life; and consequently, of doing any thing, which in his own judgement, and Reason, he shall conceive to be the aptest means thereunto." (Leviathan. 1, XIV)

Hobbes sharply distinguished this natural "liberty", from natural "laws", described generally as "a precept, or general rule, found out by reason, by which a man is forbidden to do, that, which is destructive of his life, or taketh away the means of preserving his life; and to omit, that, by which he thinketh it may best be preserved." (Leviathan. 1, XIV)

In his natural state, according to Hobbes, man's life consisted entirely of liberties and not at all of laws – "It followeth, that in such a condition, every man has the right to every thing; even to one another's body. And therefore, as long as this natural Right of every man to every thing endureth, there can be no security to any man... of living out the time, which Nature ordinarily allow men to live." (Leviathan. 1, XIV)

This would lead inevitably to a situation known as the "war of all against all", in which human beings kill, steal and enslave others to stay alive, and due to their natural lust for "Gain", "Safety" and "Reputation". Hobbes reasoned that this world of chaos created by unlimited rights was highly undesirable, since it would cause human life to be "solitary, poor, nasty, brutish, and short". As such, if humans wish to live peacefully they must give up most of their natural rights and create moral obligations to establish political and civil society. This is one of the earliest formulations of the theory of government known as the social contract.

Hobbes objected to the attempt to derive rights from "natural law", arguing that law ("lex") and right ("jus") though often confused, signify opposites, with law referring to obligations, while rights refer to the absence of obligations. Since by our (human) nature, we seek to maximize our well-being, rights are prior to law, natural or institutional, and people will not follow the laws of nature without first being subjected to a sovereign power, without which all ideas of right and wrong are meaningless – "Therefore before the names of Just and Unjust can have place, there must be some coercive Power, to compel men equally to the performance of their Covenants..., to make good that Propriety, which by mutual contract men acquire, in recompense of the universal Right they abandon: and such power there is none before the erection of the Commonwealth." (Leviathan. 1, XV)

This marked an important departure from medieval natural law theories which gave precedence to obligations over rights.

==== John Locke ====
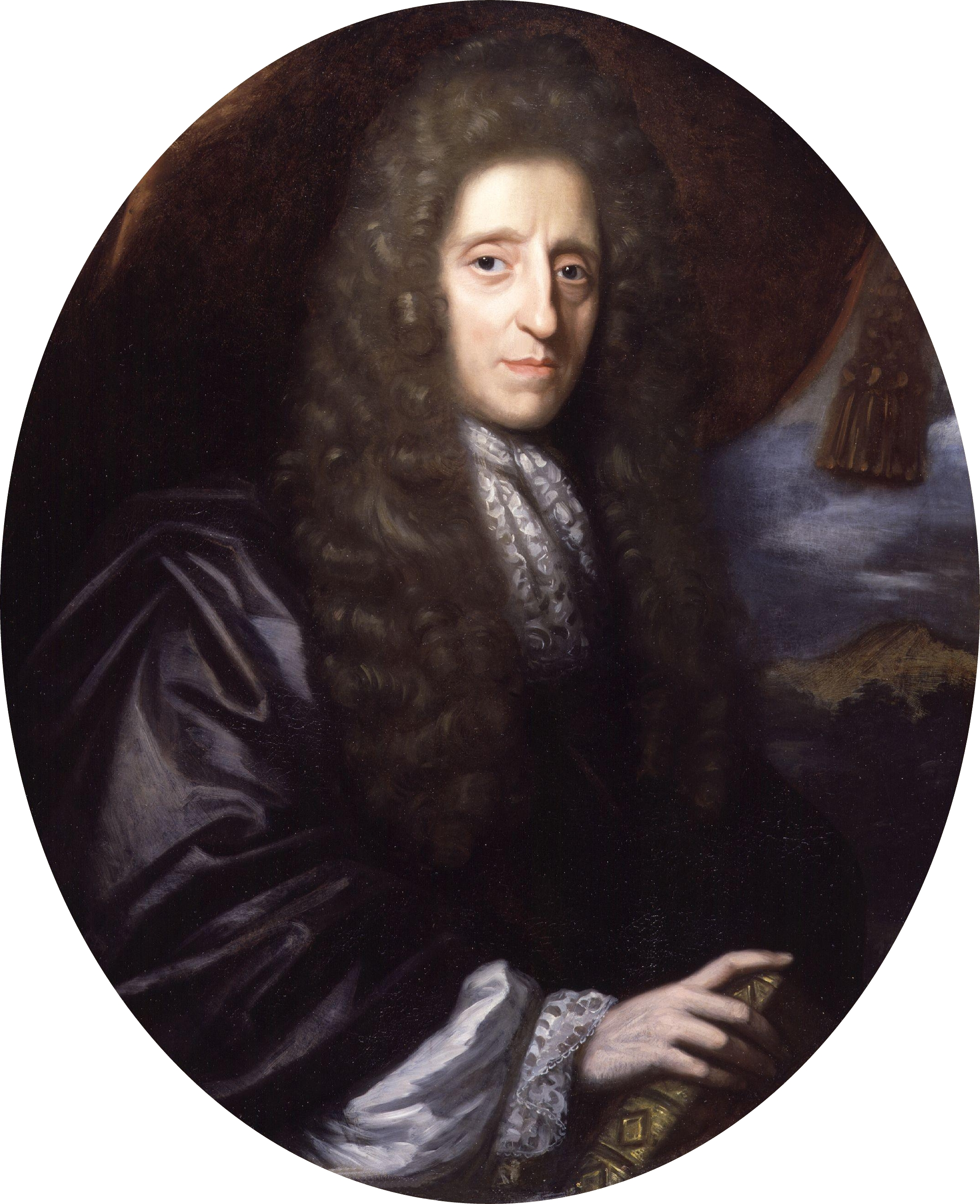
John Locke, "Life, Liberty, Estate (property)"

John Locke (1632–1704) was another prominent Western philosopher who conceptualized rights as natural and inalienable. Like Hobbes, Locke believed in a natural right to life, liberty, and property. It was once conventional wisdom that Locke greatly influenced the American Revolution with his writings of natural rights, but this claim has been the subject of protracted dispute in recent decades. For example, the historian Ray Forrest Harvey declared that Jefferson and Locke were at "two opposite poles" in their political philosophy, as evidenced by Jefferson's use in the Declaration of Independence of the phrase "pursuit of happiness" instead of "property". More recently, the eminent legal historian John Phillip Reid has deplored contemporary scholars' "misplaced emphasis on John Locke", arguing that American revolutionary leaders saw Locke as a commentator on established constitutional principles. Thomas Pangle has defended Locke's influence on the Founding, claiming that historians who argue to the contrary either misrepresent the classical republican alternative to which they say the revolutionary leaders adhered, do not understand Locke, or point to someone else who was decisively influenced by Locke. This position has also been sustained by Michael Zuckert.

According to Locke, there are three natural rights:

- Life: everyone is entitled to live.
- Liberty: everyone is entitled to do anything they want to so long as it does not conflict with the first right.
- Estate: everyone is entitled to own all they create or gain through gift or trade so long as it does not conflict with the first two rights.

In developing his concept of natural rights, Locke was influenced by reports of society among Native Americans, whom he regarded as natural peoples who lived in a "state of liberty" and perfect freedom, but "not a state of license". It also informed his conception of social contract. Although he does not say so explicitly, his position implies that even in light of our unique characteristics we should not be treated differently by our neighbors or our rulers. "Locke is arguing that there is no natural characteristic sufficient to distinguish one person from another... of course, there are plenty of natural differences between us" (Haworth 103). What Haworth takes from Locke is that John Locke was obsessed with supporting equality in society, treating everyone as an equal. He does though highlight our differences with his philosophy showing that we are all unique and important to society. In his philosophy, it is highlighted that the ideal government should also protect everyone, and provide rights and freedom to everyone, because we are all important to society. His ideas then were developed into the movements for freedom from the British creating our government. However, his implied thought of freedom for all is applied most heavily in our culture today. Starting with the civil rights movement, and continuing through women's rights, Locke's call for a fair government can be seen as the influence in these movements. His ideas are typically just seen as the foundation for modern democracy; however, it is not unreasonable to credit Locke with the social activism throughout the history of America.

By founding this sense of freedom for all, Locke was laying the groundwork for the equality that occurs today. Despite the apparent misuse of his philosophy in early American democracy. The Civil Rights movement and the suffrage movement both called out the state of American democracy during their challenges to the government's view on equality. To them it was clear that when the designers of democracy said all, they meant all people shall receive those natural rights that John Locke cherished so deeply. "a state also of equality, wherein all the power and jurisdiction is reciprocal, no one having more than another" (Locke II,4). Locke in his papers on natural philosophy clearly states that he wants a government where all are treated equal in freedoms especially. "Locke's views on toleration were very progressive for the time" (Connolly). Authors such as Jacob Connolly confirm that to them Locke was highly ahead of his time with all this progressive thinking. That is that his thought fits our current state of democracy where we strive to make sure that everyone has a say in the government, and everyone has a chance at a good life. Regardless of race, gender, or social standing starting with Locke it was made clear not only that the government should provide rights, but rights to everyone through his social contract.

The social contract is an agreement between members of a country to live within a shared system of laws. Specific forms of government are the result of the decisions made by these persons acting in their collective capacity. Government is instituted to make laws that protect the three natural rights. If a government does not properly protect these rights, it can be overthrown.

==== Thomas Paine ====
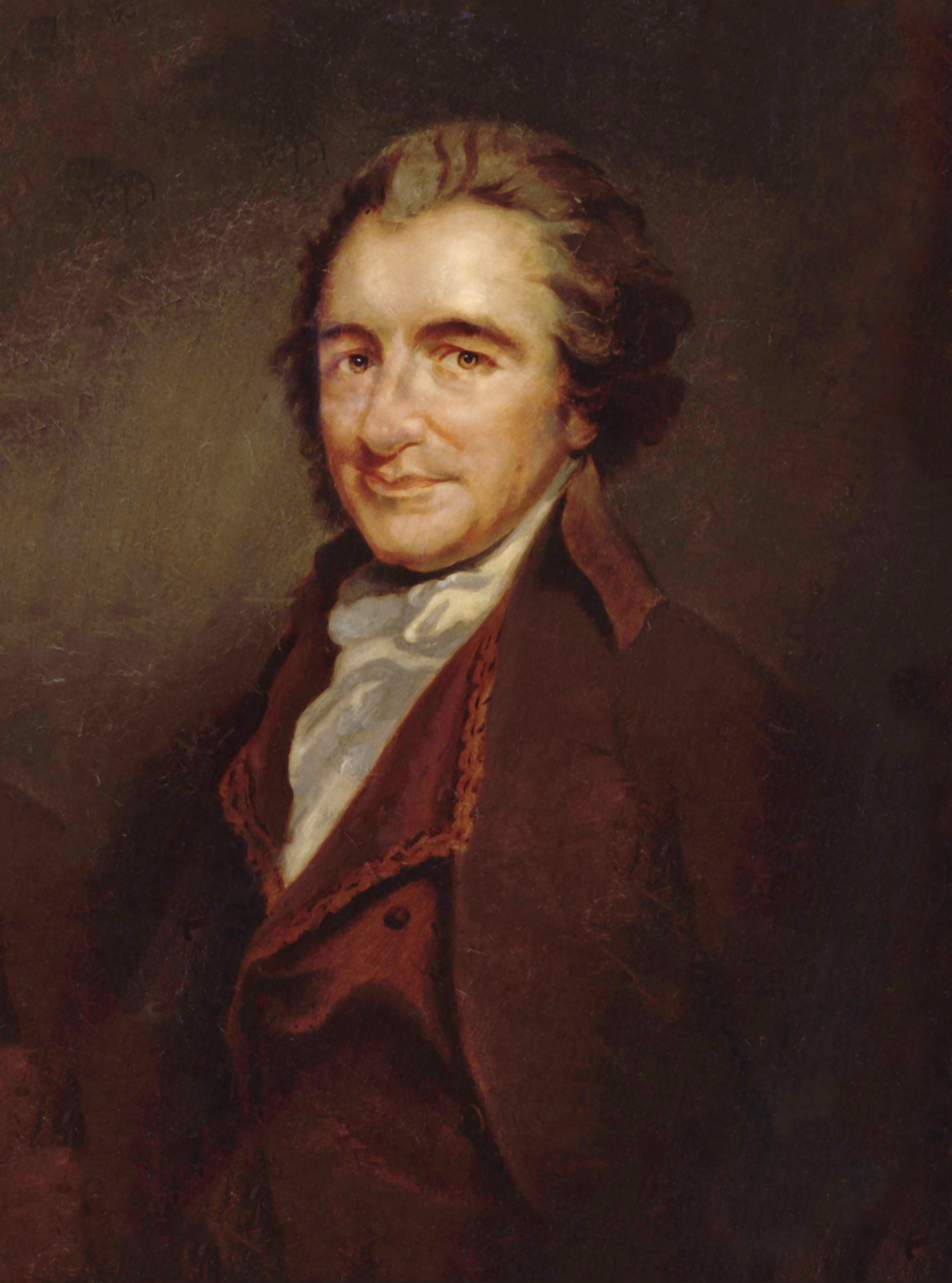
Thomas Paine

Thomas Paine (1731–1809) further elaborated on natural rights in his influential work Rights of Man (1791), emphasizing that rights cannot be granted by any charter because this would legally imply they can also be revoked and under such circumstances, they would be reduced to privileges:

It is a perversion of terms to say that a charter gives rights. It operates by a contrary effect – that of taking rights away. Rights are inherently in all the inhabitants; but charters, by annulling those rights, in the majority, leave the right, by exclusion, in the hands of a few. ... They ... consequently are instruments of injustice. The fact therefore must be that the individuals themselves, each in his own personal and sovereign right, entered into a compact with each other to produce a government: and this is the only mode in which governments have a right to arise, and the only principle on which they have a right to exist.

=== American individualist anarchists ===
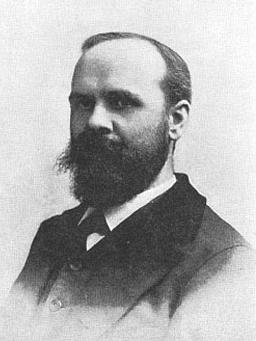
Benjamin Tucker

While at first American individualist anarchists adhered to natural rights positions, later in this era led by Benjamin Tucker, some abandoned natural rights positions and converted to Max Stirner's Egoist anarchism. Rejecting the idea of moral rights, Tucker said there were only two rights: "the right of might" and "the right of contract". He also said, after converting to Egoist individualism, "In times past... it was my habit to talk glibly of the right of man to land. It was a bad habit, and I long ago sloughed it off. ... Man's only right to land is his might over it."

According to Wendy McElroy:

In adopting Stirnerite egoism (1886), Tucker rejected natural rights which had long been considered the foundation of libertarianism. This rejection galvanized the movement into fierce debates, with the natural rights proponents accusing the egoists of destroying libertarianism itself. So bitter was the conflict that a number of natural rights proponents withdrew from the pages of Liberty in protest even though they had hitherto been among its frequent contributors. Thereafter, Liberty championed egoism although its general content did not change significantly.

Several periodicals were "undoubtedly influenced by Liberty's presentation of egoism, including I published by C.L. Swartz, edited by W.E. Gordak and J.W. Lloyd (all associates of Liberty); The Ego and The Egoist, both of which were edited by Edward H. Fulton. Among the egoist papers that Tucker followed were the German Der Eigene, edited by Adolf Brand, and The Eagle and The Serpent, issued from London. The latter, the most prominent English-language egoist journal, was published from 1898 to 1900 with the subtitle 'A Journal of Egoistic Philosophy and Sociology'". Among those American anarchists who adhered to egoism include Benjamin Tucker, John Beverley Robinson, Steven T. Byington, Hutchins Hapgood, James L. Walker, Victor Yarros and E.H. Fulton.

=== Leo Strauss: Critique & Defense of Natural Right ===
Leo Strauss defends natural right against German critiques of a sort that pave the way to the Third Reich in his Walgreen lectures and in later works also entering into a debate with the Nazi legal theorist Carl Schmitt on related issues. His concern echoes Locke’s fear of the war-of-all-against-all. His defense is multi-faceted and his primary thesis remains largely implicit—without an operative defense of Natural Right society will disintegrate and nihilisms of the sort that gave rise to the Third Reich will predominate. Effectively: Natural Right may be repealed in practice yet what remains will not transcend but rather fall short of any organization that could properly be considered ‘social,’ or 'human'--in which the notion of freedom would be rendered meaningless. Whether or not the argument for Natural Right is plausible in an absolutely decisive or purely formal sense it will nevertheless motivate a sufficiently popular self-defense of liberalism against the (equally false or contingent) transcendentalism of fascism, thought Leo Strauss. Incomplete according to its formal contingency or dependence on popular behavior, Strauss’s argument remains permanently open until such time as liberalism is impracticable or becomes indefensible—seemingly (arguably) supported by the supremacy of liberal republicanism (or representative democratic capitalism) in geopolitics in the later phases of the 20th century, but potentially falling with the failure of the same.

== Contemporary ==
Many documents now echo the phrase used in the United States Declaration of Independence. The preamble to the 1948 United Nations Universal Declaration of Human Rights asserts that rights are inalienable: "recognition of the inherent dignity and of the equal and inalienable rights of all members of the human family is the foundation of freedom, justice and peace in the world." Article 1, § 1 of the California Constitution recognizes inalienable rights and articulated some (not all) of those rights as "defending life and liberty, acquiring, possessing, and protecting property, and pursuing and obtaining safety, happiness, and privacy." However, there is still much dispute over which "rights" are truly natural rights and which are not, and the concept of natural or inalienable rights is still controversial to some.

Erich Fromm argued that some powers over human beings could be wielded only by God, and that if there were no God, no human beings could wield these powers.

Contemporary political philosophies continuing the classical liberal tradition of natural rights include libertarianism, anarcho-capitalism and Objectivism, and include amongst their canon the works of authors such as Robert Nozick, Ayn Rand and Murray Rothbard. A libertarian view of inalienable rights is laid out in Morris and Linda Tannehill's The Market for Liberty, which claims that a man has a right to ownership over his life and therefore also his property, because he has invested time (i.e. part of his life) in it and thereby made it an extension of his life. However, if he initiates force against and to the detriment of another man, he alienates himself from the right to that part of his life which is required to pay his debt: "Rights are not inalienable, but only the possessor of a right can alienate himself from that right – no one else can take a man's rights from him."

Various definitions of inalienability include non-relinquishability, non-salability, and non-transferability. This concept has been recognized by libertarians as being central to the question of voluntary slavery, which Murray Rothbard dismissed as illegitimate and even self-contradictory. Stephan Kinsella argues that "viewing rights as alienable is perfectly consistent with – indeed, implied by – the libertarian non-aggression principle. Under this principle, only the initiation of force is prohibited; defensive, restitutive, or retaliatory force is not."

Various philosophers have created different lists of rights they consider to be natural. Proponents of natural rights, in particular Hesselberg and Rothbard, have responded that reason can be applied to separate truly axiomatic rights from supposed rights, stating that any principle that requires itself to be disproved is an axiom. Critics have pointed to the lack of agreement between the proponents as evidence for the claim that the idea of natural rights is merely a political tool.

Hugh Gibbons has proposed a descriptive argument based on human biology. His contention is that human beings were other-regarding as a matter of necessity, to avoid the costs of conflict. Over time they developed expectations that individuals would act in certain ways which were then prescribed by society (duties of care etc.) and that eventually crystallized into actionable rights.

Philosopher Alex Naileg argues that if biological parents have parental responsibility towards their born children, then abortion rights entail that persons capable of becoming pregnant have the right to relinquish their future parental responsibility; however, the biological fathers of their born children do not have the same right to relinquish their future parental responsibility, thereby violating equality of rights. Thus, under these premises biologically different people have different rights. The argument extends to natural rights if someone maintains that the right to bodily autonomy is a natural right.

=== Catholic Church ===
The Catholic Church considers natural law a dogma. The Church considers that: "The natural law expresses the original moral sense which enables man to discern by reason the good and the evil, the truth and the lie: 'The natural law is written and engraved in the soul of each and every man, because it is human reason ordaining him to do good and forbidding him to sin . . . But this command of human reason would not have the force of law if it were not the voice and interpreter of a higher reason to which our spirit and our freedom must be submitted.'" The natural law consists, for the Catholic Church, of one supreme and universal principle from which are derived all our natural moral obligations or duties. Thomas Aquinas resumes the various ideas of Catholic moral thinkers about what this principle is: since good is what primarily falls under the apprehension of the practical reason, the supreme principle of moral action must have the good as its central idea, and therefore the supreme principle is that good is to be done and evil avoided.

== See also ==
- Constitutional economics – Research program in economics and constitutionalism
- Constitutionalism – Belief that government authority derives from fundamental law
- Dignity – Person's right to be valued, respected and treated ethically
- Legal positivism – School of thought of philosophy of law and jurisprudence
- Natural person in French law – French legal term
- Natural-rights libertarianism – Political ideology
- Need – Thing that is necessary for an organism to live a healthy life
- Ratchet effect – Restrained ability of human process reversal
- Rule according to higher law – Belief that universal principles of morality override unjust laws
- Rule of law – Political situation in which everyone is subject to the law
- Special rights – Political rights given to some groups
- Substantive due process – Legal principle
