= Words (disambiguation) =

A word is a basic element of language.

Words may also refer to:

- Words (Tony Rich album), an album by American R&B musician Tony Rich
- Words (F. R. David song), a song by French singer F. R. David
- Words (Daya song), a song by American singer Daya
- Words (Alesso song), a song by Swedish DJ Alesso
- Words (Bee Gees song), a song by British singing group the Bee Gees

== See also ==
- Word (disambiguation)
- Words, Words, Words (disambiguation)
