= The Word =

The Word or The Words may refer to:

== Religion ==
- Logos (Christianity), concept in the Christian doctrine
- The Bible, collection of sacred texts central to Christianity
  - The Word Bible Software, a Bible study software

== Arts and media ==
- The Word (radio programme), a BBC World Service book programme

=== Film ===
- The Word (1943 film), a 1943 Swedish drama film
- The Word (1953 film), a 1953 documentary film
- The Word (1955 film) or Ordet, a 1955 Danish film
- The Words (film), 2012 American film

=== Literature ===
- The Word (novel), a 1972 novel by Irving Wallace, and a 1978 TV miniseries adaptation
- The Word (UK magazine), a music magazine
- The Word (Belgian magazine), a lifestyle, photography and art magazine
- The Word (US magazine), a 19th-century anarchist free love magazine edited by Ezra and Angela Heywood
- The Words (book), a 1963 autobiography by Jean-Paul Sartre

=== Television ===
- The Word (TV series), a British series
- "The Word" (The Handmaid's Tale), a television episode
- "The Words" (The Amazing World of Gumball), a television episode
- The Word Network, a religious broadcasting network
- The Wørd, a recurring segment on The Colbert Report TV series

=== Music ===
- The Word (band), a blues/jam rock group
- "The Word" (song), a 1965 song by The Beatles
- "The Word", a 2007 song by Patti Scialfa from the album Play It as It Lays
- "The Word", a 2001 song by Sara Groves from the album Conversations
- "The Words", a 2006 song by Psapp from the album The Only Thing I Ever Wanted
- "The Words", a 2022 song by Anaïs Mitchell from the album Anaïs Mitchell

== Places ==
- The Word Bookstore, a philosophy and poetry bookstore in Montreal
- The Word (library), South Shields

== See also ==
- Surfin' Bird, known for the lyrics "Bird is The Word"
- Word (disambiguation)
