= Word (disambiguation) =

A word is a unit of language.

Word(s) may also refer to:

== Computing and computer science ==
- Word (computer architecture), a group of bits or digits/characters processed as a unit
- Word (formal language theory), a finite sequence of letters taken from an alphabet
- words (Unix), a standard file in UNIX
- Microsoft Word, a word-processing application
- Calligra Words, a word-processing application
- William Whitaker's Words, a program for translating Latin

== Media ==
- WORD (AM), a radio station (950 AM) in Spartanburg, South Carolina, United States
- WORD-FM, a radio station (101.5 FM) in Pittsburgh, Pennsylvania, United States
- Word Magazine, an influential online magazine, active from 1995 to 2000
- Word: Live at Carnegie Hall, a Louis C.K. live comedy album
- Word Books, an imprint of publisher Thomas Nelson

== Music ==
- Word Records, a record label

=== Albums ===
- Words (Sherrié Austin album), 1997
- Words (Tony Rich album), 1996
- Words (F. R. David album), 1982
- Words (Sara Evans album) and title track, 2017
- Words, an EP by Shawn Austin, 2024, or the title track

=== Songs ===
- "The Word" (song), 1965 song by the Beatles
- "Words" (Alesso song), 2022
- "Words" (Bee Gees song), 1968
- "Words" (The Christians song), 1989
- "Words" (Anthony David song), 2008
- "Words" (F. R. David song), 1982
- "Words" (Daya song), 2016
- "Words I Never Said", aka "Words" by Skylar Grey, 2012
- "Words" (Kate Miller-Heidke song), 2007
- "Words" (The Monkees song), 1967
- "Words" (Piri & Tommy song), 2022
- "Words", song by Alien Ant Farm from the 2003 album Truant
- "Words", song by Cheap Trick from the 2003 album Special One
- "Words", song by Doves from The Last Broadcast
- "Words", a song by Naaz from Bits of Naaz
- "Words", song by Gregory Alan Isakov, from This Empty Northern Hemisphere
- "Words", song by Low from I Could Live in Hope, 1994
- "Words", song by Madonna from Erotica
- "Words", song by Missing Persons
- "Words", song by Paul van Dyk from his 1996 album Seven Ways
- "Words", song by Days of the New from their 2001 album
- "Words", song by Hawk Nelson from their 2013 album Made
- "The Word", song by Patti Scialfa from her 2007 album Play It as It Lays
- "Words", song by Train from the 2009 album Save Me, San Francisco
- "Words", song by Lucinda Williams from the 2007 album West
- "Words (Between the Lines of Age)", song by Neil Young from Harvest

== Other uses ==
- Word (journal), the journal of the International Linguistic Association (formerly the Linguistic Circle of New York)
- Word (group theory), a product of group elements and their inverses
- Alene Word (1906–1990) American politician

== See also ==
- The Word (disambiguation)
- Word FM (disambiguation)
- Word count, the number of words in a document or passage of text
- Word stem, a part of a word used with slightly different meanings
- Word (surname), people with the surname "Word"
