= Ezra Heywood =

American activist (1829–1893)

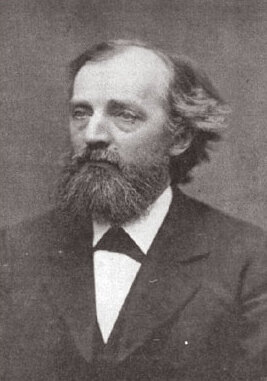
- Born: Ezra Hervey Hoar; September 29, 1829; United States
- Died: May 22, 1893 (aged 63); United States
- Occupations: Activist, abolitionist
- Spouse: Angela Heywood

Ezra Hervey Heywood (/ˈheɪˌwʊd/; September 29, 1829 – May 22, 1893), known as Ezra Hervey Hoar before 1848, was an American individualist anarchist, slavery abolitionist, and advocate of equal rights for women.

== Activism ==
Heywood co-founded the New England Labor Reform League in 1869 with individualist anarchist William Batchelder Greene. The league advocated for the "abolition of class laws and false customs, whereby legitimate enterprise is defrauded by speculative monopoly." and favored "[f]ree contracts, free money, free markets, free transit, and free land".

In May 1872, Heywood, a supporter of women's suffrage and free love activist Victoria Woodhull's free speech rights, began editing individualist anarchist magazine The Word from his home in Princeton, Massachusetts. He was tried in 1878 for mailing "obscene material", his pamphlet Cupid's Yokes: or, The Binding Forces of Conjugal Life: An Essay to Consider Some Moral and Physiological Phases of Love and Marriage, Wherein is Asserted the Natural Right and Necessity of Sexual Self-Government, which attacked traditional notions of marriage – at the instigation of postal inspector Anthony Comstock, who also had Truth Seeker editor D. M. Bennett arrested. Convicted of violating the 1873 Comstock Act, Heywood was sentenced to two years' hard labor at the Norfolk County Jail.

Heywood used his own notation, Y.L. (Year of Love), in replacement A. D.

== Personal life ==
Heywood met his wife Angela Heywood through her work in the abolitionist movement. They had four children together named Psyche, Angelo, Vesta, and Hermes.

== Works ==
- Uncivil Liberty: An Essay to Show the Injustice and Impolicy of Ruling Woman Without Her Consent (1873) by Ezra Heywood – one of the first individualist feminist essays, by Ezra Heywood (with an introduction by James J. Martin)
- Cupid's Yokes: or, The Binding Forces of Conjugal Life: An Essay to Consider some Moral and Physiological Phases of Love and Marriage by Ezra Heywood – a free-love essay defending the natural right of "sexual self-government" as opposed to marriage

== See also ==
- Anarchism in the United States
- Anarchism and issues related to love and sex
- Faneuil Hall
- Individualist feminism
- Pioneers of American Freedom: Origin of Liberal and Radical Thought in America
- List of people pardoned or granted clemency by the president of the United States
