= Word FM =

Word FM may refer to:

- WORD-FM, a radio station broadcasting on 101.5 FM in Pittsburgh, Pennsylvania, USA
- The Word FM, a network of stations in Eastern Pennsylvania, USA, which includes WBYO
- KWRD-FM, a radio station broadcasting on 100.7 FM in Highland Village, Texas, USA, which is branded as "The Word FM"
- Word FM (Ghana), a radio station broadcasting on 88.3 FM in Bolgatanga (Zuarungu), Ghana.
- WYRD-FM, a radio station broadcasting on 98.9 FM in Spartanburg, South Carolina that previously simulcasted sister station WORD and still brands with its call letters.
