= Words, Words, Words (disambiguation) =

Words, Words, Words is a comedy play by David Ives.

"Words, words, words.", a phrase quoted from Hamlet, may also refer to:

- Words Words Words, a 2010 comedy routine and album by Bo Burnham
- "Words... Words... Words...", a song by Léo Ferré from the 1980 album La Violence et l'Ennui
- "Words, Words, Words", a song from the 1964 musical Bajour
