= The Word (Belgian magazine) =

The Word magazine is a Brussels-based, bi-annual lifestyle, photography and art magazine.
