= Angela Heywood =

American writer and activist (1840–1935)

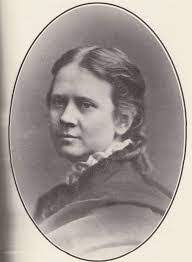
- Born: Angela Fiducia Tilton; 1840; Deerfield, New Hampshire, U.S.
- Died: 1935 (aged 94–95); Princeton, Massachusetts, U.S.
- Occupation: Writer
- Spouse: Ezra Heywood
- Children: 4
- Writing career
- Subjects: Feminism, free love
- Notable work: The Word

Angela Fiducia Heywood (1840–1935) was an American radical writer and activist, known as a free love advocate, suffragist, socialist, spiritualist, labor reformer, and abolitionist.

== Early life ==
Angela Heywood was born in Deerfield, New Hampshire, around 1840 to Daniel and Lucy Tilton. Her father was a farmer and her mother was a radical thinker who was a descendant of the philosopher John Locke. Lucy taught all six of her children sex education from an early age, encouraging them not to use euphemisms or be secretive about sex.

When the family fell into poverty, Heywood earned money as a housemaid for Reverend John Prince, and later as a caregiver to the child of Reverend Charles J. Bowen of Newburyport, Massachusetts. This work gave her a perspective on wage labor which would influence her later views on labor reform. When she was eighteen, Heywood had a religious experience and became active in her church, though she later criticized the church quite harshly in her writings.

Although she had little formal education, Heywood was politically conscious, and she joined the abolitionist movement. Through this activism, she met her husband Ezra Heywood, a fellow abolitionist and a labor reformer. They were married in Old South Church in Boston on June 5, 1865, and moved to the town of Princeton, Massachusetts, where they bought a large house from which to run their publishing business. They had four children together, named Psyche, Angelo, Vesta, and Hermes.

== Career ==
Between May 1872 and April 1893, Angela and Ezra worked together to publish The Word: A Monthly Journal of Reform. They called their business the Cooperative Publishing Company, and eventually became infamous for their blunt discussions of taboo subjects.

The Word catered to many different movements, including free love, women's suffrage, socialism, and labor reform. It published a variety of works, such as essays, editorials, and book reviews. Ezra Heywood also wrote and distributed a series of pamphlets entitled Cupid's Yokes, which condemned the institution of marriage as akin to slavery for women.

Heywood herself was a frequent writer for The Word, and considered herself to be a "word-painter," referring to her own beliefs as a kind of "ethics" or "religion" to be followed. She wrote extensively on a variety of topics, but was most well known for her writings on sexuality. She believed that there were specific moral codes that men and women should follow. This especially applied to men, who she believed should be obligated to control their sexual desires and take responsibility for their actions. This meant, among other things, that they should acknowledge their illegitimate children rather than leaving the children and their mothers to be stigmatized by society.

According to Heywood, women needed to realize that they too were allowed to derive pleasure from sex. In some ways, however, Heywood did subscribe to the gender stereotypes of the time. For example, even though she believed that women could feel sexual "passion," she did not think it was in their nature to consider the possibility of sex without love, whereas men were likely to do this.

In addition to her writings about sex, Heywood championed women's suffrage and wrote passionate arguments against rape. She was a labor reformer, and believed wealthy women to be "morally corrupt" because they did not work. She ardently defended prostitutes, blaming their poverty and desperation on the men who exploited them, while most people of the time simply blamed the women themselves for the institution of prostitution.

Heywood was also an anarchist and a spiritualist, meaning that she rejected the authority of the government and the church. She believed the church to be too constricting in its treatment of female sexuality, and said that the "church-state grip" on sexual knowledge caused "women and labor" to be put into a place of "subjected destitution." It is unclear why or when the church fell out of favor in her mind, but it likely happened sometime between 1865, when she got married in a church, and 1872, when she began writing for The Word, criticizing the church. Her husband's view that the church played too large a role in marriage may have influenced Heywood's change of heart in this matter.

Heywood's anarchist beliefs were largely influenced by the fact that women did not have the right to vote. She supported women's suffrage, but believed that reform alone would not be enough to change the ideology of the government; women, she said, should not have to acknowledge the state's legitimacy since the state did not acknowledge theirs. She even felt that the United States was "not a republican government," since a republic is meant to be for the people and the government only catered to the needs of half the population.

Heywood was heavily influenced by the practices of the Oneida Community of New York, especially its leader, John Humphrey Noyes. This community had a strong belief in free love and operated on a system of "complex marriage," in which every community member was essentially considered to be married to all the others in the community and could have sexual relationships with anyone they chose. This corresponded with Heywood's dislike of secrecy surrounding sexuality, and likely influenced her writings for The Word.

Unfortunately, the Heywoods' lack of money meant that Angela had to spend much of her time doing housework and had little time left over to write. She could not attend many conferences because she had to take care of the children. At one point, Ezra published a plea for funds in an issue of The Word, writing, "A.T.H. needs money to liberate herself from too much housework, so she can give more time to writing…Will not financially able men and sympathetic women help her 'articulate' by pouring in cash?" The Word actually stopped being published between 1890 and 1892 when Ezra was in prison and Angela did not have time to run it herself.

Over the years, Angela wrote prolifically for The Word, and was often angry at Ezra for editing her essays and cutting out what she felt were important parts (though he never censored her strong language). Despite Angela's massive contributions to The Word, however, only Ezra was ever credited as editor, except for six months in 1878 when he was in jail and Benjamin Tucker took over as his substitute. However, Angela was always considered to be the unofficial co-editor.

== Criticism ==
Ezra's pamphlets were frequently condemned by Anthony Comstock, the man behind the 1873 Comstock Act, which prohibited the circulation of "obscenity" in the US mail. Ezra was imprisoned twice, once from June to December 1878 and again from June 1890 to June 1892.

While her husband was in jail, Heywood generated most of the family's income by running the Mountain Home summer resort out of their home. She also earned some money teaching and speaking at conferences. The Cooperative Publishing Company, despite being widely known, did not actually earn them much money, so the Heywoods were still quite poor.

Heywood despised the secrecy surrounding sex and was frequently criticized for her use of explicit or obscene language in The Word. She also advocated proper sex education for children, specifically to be taught by their mothers. Although many people denounced her use of vulgar language, she felt strongly that she was being held to a double standard. Heywood reasoned that "If man says 'womb' without rising heat or dishonest purpose, why should not woman say 'penis' without blushing squirm or sheepish looks?" She wanted to create "Sex-Unity," which she said was a balance between men and women in terms of free speech.

She and Ezra were both ardent defenders of birth control for women; in fact, the second time Ezra was arrested, it was because he was distributing pamphlets that Angela had written about birth control. She was also one of the only outspoken defenders of abortion during this time, stating her support for women's right to control their own bodies in 1893. The very mention of abortion through the mail was at this time prohibited by the Comstock Law and the procedure itself was also illegal, making Heywood stand out as radical even among her fellow reformers.

Heywood spoke at the New England Free Love League Convention in Boston in November 1877 and was criticized by Anthony Comstock for her "obscenity." Many people believed she was insane, while others (including some women, like Bostonian Laura C. Eldridge) believed she should go to prison for using such language. Heywood's own brother-in-law (Ezra's brother, Samuel Heywood), disliked the work that Ezra and Angela were doing so immensely that he foreclosed on their house in September 1878 while Ezra was in prison. Angela and her children were briefly homeless, until friends loaned the Heywoods enough money for them to get their house back.

== Later life ==
The Word stopped being published after Ezra's death in May 1893, and little is known about the rest of Angela's life, though a neighbor recalled that she was "doing day work in office buildings."

According to her daughter Psyche, Angela Heywood died at the age of 95.

== Works ==
- Has love a scientific basis? In: "Woodhull & Claflin Weekly", March 1, 1873, p. 13
- Body Housekeeping, in: Freedom, Feminism, and The State. An Overview of Individualist Feminism. Ed. Wendy McElroy. Holmes & Meier, New York 1991 ISBN 0945999674 pp. 131–134

== Bibliography ==
- Dawson, Oswald (1897). Personal Rights and Sexual Wrongs (1st ed.). London: William Reeves. OCLC 15984793.
- Earnest, Ernest (1974). The American Eve in Fact and Fiction 1775-1914. Urbana: University of Illinois Press. ISBN 9780252004483. OCLC 972334385.
- Battan, Jesse F. (1993). ""The Word Made Flesh": Language, Authority, and Sexual Desire in Late Nineteenth-Century America". In Fout, John C.; Tantillo, Maura Shaw (eds.). American Sexual Politics: Sex, Gender, and Race since the Civil War. Chicago: University of Chicago Press. pp. 101–122. ISBN 0226257851. LCCN 92-47347. OCLC 27265688.
- Rosenbaum, Jennifer Ann (1999). A Fly in the Amber of her Husband's Genius (Master's). Boston: Simmons College. OCLC 44465606.
- Sears, Hal D. (1977). The Sex Radicals. Lawrence: Regents Press of Kansas. doi:10.2307/j.ctv1p2gm83. ISBN 0700631194. JSTOR j.ctv1p2gm83. OCLC 647007433. S2CID 245662027.
