= Word (surname) =

Word is a surname. Notable people with the surname include:

- Barry Word (born 1964), American football player
- James Word (born c. 1953), member of the Arkansas House of Representatives
- Mark Word (born 1975), American football player
- Robert L. Word (1866–1945), Justice of the Montana Supreme Court
