= The Word (US magazine) =

Former American anarchist magazine

The Word was an American magazine focusing on individualist anarchism and free love. It was founded in 1872 and ran until 1893. The magazine was edited by Ezra Heywood and Angela Heywood from 1872–1890 and 1892–1893, and was issued first from Princeton and then from Cambridge, Massachusetts.

The Word was subtitled "A Monthly Journal of Reform", and it included contributions from Josiah Warren, Benjamin Tucker, and Joshua K. Ingalls. Initially, The Word presented free love as a minor theme which was expressed within a labor reform format, but the publication later evolved into an explicitly free love periodical. At some point Tucker became an important contributor but later became dissatisfied with the journal's focus on free love since he desired a concentration on economics.
