= Max Stirner =

German philosopher (1806–1856)

- A Portrait of Stirner, sketched by Friedrich Engels, 1842 (Note: The only surviving pictures of Stirner consist of two sketches by Engels.)
- Born: Johann Caspar Schmidt; 25 October 1806; Bayreuth, Kingdom of Bavaria
- Died: 26 June 1856 (aged 49); Berlin, Prussia, German Confederation
- Spouses: Agnes Burtz (m. 1837; died 1838) Marie Dähnhardt (m. 1843; div. 1846)

Education
- Education: Gymnasium Illustre zu Bayreuth; University of Berlin (no degree); University of Erlangen (no degree)

Philosophical work
- Era: 19th-century philosophy
- Region: Western philosophy
- School: Continental philosophy; Egoism; Anti-foundationalism; Dialectical egoism; Egoist anarchism (post-mortem); Post-Hegelianism; Young Hegelians (early)
- Main interests: Egoism; ethics; ontology; pedagogy; philosophy of history; philosophy of religion; philosophy of education; property theory; psychology; value theory; philosophy of love; dialectic
- Notable ideas: Personalism in education; Der Einzige (transl. the unique); Eigenheit (transl. ownness); Creative nothing; Union of egoists

Johann Caspar Schmidt (25 October 1806 – 26 June 1856), known by the pen name Max Stirner (/ˈstɜːrnər/; German: [ˈʃtɪʁnɐ]), was a German philosopher, dealing mainly with the Hegelian notion of social alienation and self-consciousness. Stirner is often seen as one of the forerunners of nihilism, existentialism, psychoanalytic theory, postmodernism, individualist anarchism, and egoism.

Born in 1806 in Bayreuth, Bavaria, Stirner's life and work are known largely through a biography written by John Henry Mackay. Following the death of his father, he was raised in West Prussia after his mother's remarriage. Stirner studied at the University of Berlin, where he attended Hegel's lectures. He then moved into teaching and became involved with the Young Hegelians in Berlin. Although he struggled to secure a permanent academic post, Stirner became a fixture in intellectual circles and wrote his most famous work, The Ego and Its Own (1844), while supporting himself as a teacher.

Stirner married twice, first to Agnes Burtz, who died in 1838, and later to Marie Dähnhardt. He attempted and failed at business before turning to translation and writing. Stirner died in Berlin in 1856, having spent his later years in relative obscurity, despite the enduring influence of his radical individualist philosophy.

== Biography ==
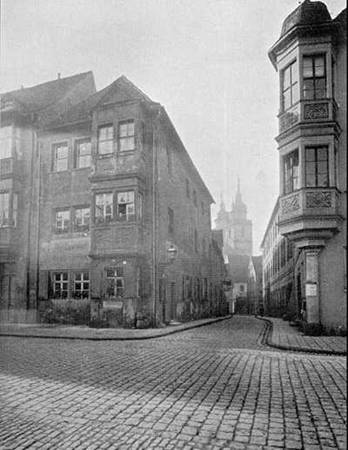
Stirner's birthplace in Bayreuth

Johann Caspar Schmidt was born on 25 October 1806 in Bayreuth, Bavaria. Stirner was a nickname referencing the size of his forehead, and eventually he would take it on as his pen name in the form Max Stirner. What little is known of his life is mostly due to the Scottish-born German writer John Henry Mackay, who wrote a biography of Stirner (Max Stirner – sein Leben und sein Werk), published in German in 1898 (enlarged 1910, 1914) and translated into English in 2005. Stirner was the only child of Albert Christian Heinrich Schmidt (1769–1807) and Sophia Elenora Reinlein (1778–1839), who were Lutherans. His father died of tuberculosis on 19 April 1807 at the age of 37. In 1809, his mother remarried to Heinrich Ballerstedt (a pharmacist) and settled in West Prussian Kulm (now Chełmno, Poland). When Stirner turned 20, he attended the University of Berlin, where he studied philology. He attended the lectures of Georg Wilhelm Friedrich Hegel, who was to become a source of inspiration for his thinking. He attended Hegel's lectures on the history of philosophy, the philosophy of religion and the subjective spirit. Stirner then moved to the University of Erlangen, which he attended at the same time as Ludwig Feuerbach.

Stirner returned to Berlin and obtained a teaching certificate, but he was unable to obtain a full-time teaching post from the Prussian government. While in Berlin in 1841, Stirner participated in discussions with a group of young philosophers called Die Freien (The Free Ones), whom historians have subsequently categorized as the Young Hegelians. Some of the best known names in 19th-century literature and philosophy were involved with this group, including Karl Marx, Friedrich Engels, Bruno Bauer and Arnold Ruge. While some of the Young Hegelians were eager subscribers to Hegel's dialectical method and attempted to apply dialectical approaches to Hegel's conclusions, the left-wing members of the group broke with Hegel. Feuerbach and Bauer led this charge.

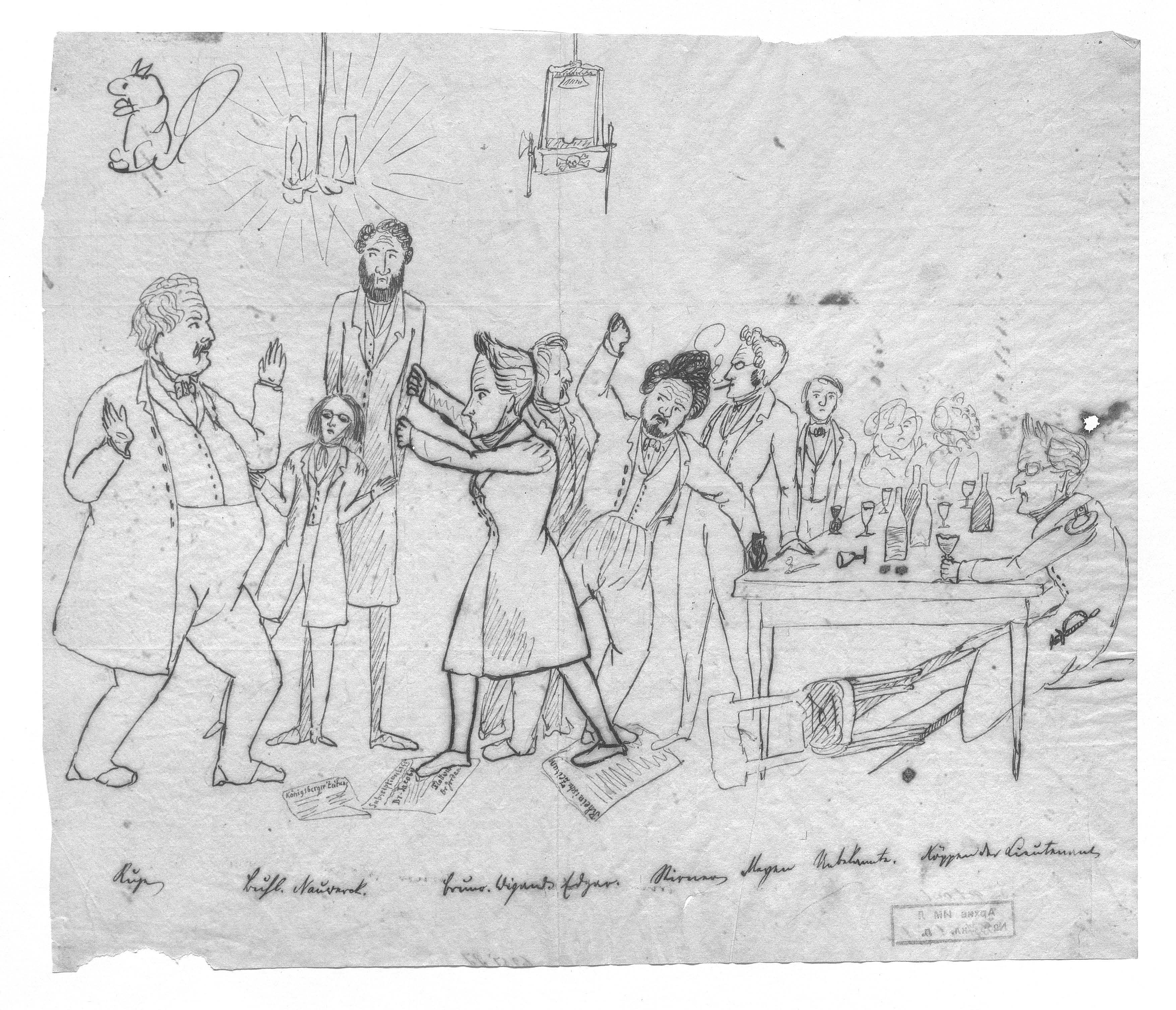
Stirner, here depicted by Engels in 1842 standing, smoking and laying a hand on a table, was a member of the short-lived Young Hegelian group known as Die Freien.

Frequently the debates would take place at Hippel's, a wine bar in Friedrichstraße, attended by among others Marx and Engels, who were both adherents of Feuerbach at the time. Stirner met with Engels many times and Engels even recalled that they were "great friends," but it is still unclear whether Marx and Stirner ever met. It does not appear that Stirner contributed much to the discussions, but he was a faithful member of the club and an attentive listener. The most-often reproduced portrait of Stirner is a cartoon by Engels, drawn forty years later from memory at biographer Mackay's request. It is highly likely that this and the group sketch of Die Freien at Hippel's are the only firsthand images of Stirner. Stirner worked as a teacher in a school for young girls owned by Madame Gropius when he wrote his major work, The Unique and Its Property. Ludwig Pietsch agreed to Bruno Bauer's request to create a portrait of Stirner based on his corpse; however, the drawing has since been lost.

Stirner married twice. His first wife was Agnes Burtz (1815–1838), the daughter of his landlady, whom he married on 12 December 1837. However, she died giving birth to a stillborn child in 1838. In 1843, he married Marie Dähnhardt, an intellectual associated with Die Freien. Their ad hoc wedding took place at Stirner's apartment, during which the participants were notably dressed casually, used copper rings as they had forgotten to buy wedding rings, and needed to search the whole neighborhood for a Bible as they did not have their own. In 1844, The Unique and Its Property was dedicated "to my sweetheart Marie Dähnhardt." Afterward, using Marie's inheritance, Stirner opened a dairy shop that handled the distribution of milk from dairy farmers into the city, but was unable to solicit the customers needed to keep the business afloat. It quickly failed and drove a wedge between him and Marie, leading to their separation in 1847. Marie later converted to Catholicism and died in 1902 in London.

After The Unique and Its Property, Stirner wrote Stirner's Critics and translated Adam Smith's The Wealth of Nations and Jean-Baptiste Say's Traité d'economie politique into German to little financial gain. He also wrote a compilation of texts titled History of Reaction in 1852.

In May 1856, Stirner contracted a “nervous fever" in Berlin, seemingly after being stung by an insect. He died on 25 June 1856. Only Bruno Bauer and Ludwig Buhl represented the Young Hegelians present at his funeral, held at the Friedhof II der Sophiengemeinde Berlin.

== Philosophy ==
Stirner, whose main philosophical work was The Unique and Its Property, is credited as a major influence in the development of nihilism, existentialism and post-modernism as well as individualist anarchism, post-anarchism and post-left anarchy. He also influenced illegalists, feminists, nihilists and bohemians, as well as fascists, right-libertarians and anarcho-capitalists. Stirner was opposed to communism for the same reasons he opposed Christianity, capitalism, humanism, liberalism, property rights and nationalism, seeing them as forms of unacceptable authority over the individual. Stirner also influenced anarcho-communists and post-left anarchists. The writers of An Anarchist FAQ report that "many in the anarchist movement in Glasgow, Scotland, took Stirner's 'Union of egoists' literally as the basis for their anarcho-syndicalist organising in the 1940s and beyond." Similarly, the noted anarchist historian Max Nettlau states that "[o]n reading Stirner, I maintain that he cannot be interpreted except in a socialist sense." Stirner was anti-capitalist and pro-labour, attacking "the division of labour resulting from private property for its deadening effects on the ego and individuality of the worker" and writing that free competition "is not 'free,' because I lack the things for competition. [...] Under the regime of the commonality the labourers always fall into the hands of the possessors of the capitalists [...]. The labourer cannot realise on his labour to the extent of the value that it has for the customer. [...] The state rests on the slavery of labour. If labour becomes free, the state is lost." For Stirner, "Labor has an egoistic character; the laborer is the egoist."

=== Egoism ===
Stirner's egoism argues that individuals are impossible to fully comprehend, as no understanding of the self can adequately describe the fullness of experience. Stirner has been broadly understood as containing traits of both psychological egoism and rational egoism. Unlike the self-interest described by Ayn Rand, Stirner did not address individual self-interest, selfishness, or prescriptions for how one should act. He urged individuals to decide for themselves and fulfill their own egoism.

Stirner believed that everyone was propelled by their own egoism and desires and that those who accepted this—as willing egoists—could freely live their individual desires, while those who did not—as unwilling egoists—will falsely believe they are fulfilling another cause while they are secretly fulfilling their own desires for happiness and security. The willing egoist would see that they could act freely, unbound from obedience to sacred but artificial truths like law, rights, morality, and religion. Power is the method of Stirner's egoism and the only justified method of gaining philosophical property. Stirner did not believe in the one-track pursuit of greed, which as only one aspect of the ego would lead to being possessed by a cause other than the full ego. He did not believe in natural rights to property and encouraged insurrection against all forms of authority, including disrespect for both private and personal property.

=== Anarchism ===
Stirner proposes that most commonly accepted social institutions—including the notion of state, property as a right, natural rights in general and the very notion of society—are mere illusions, "spooks" or ghosts in the mind. He advocates egoism and a form of amoralism in which individuals would unite in Unions of egoists only when it was in their self-interest to do so. For him, property simply comes about through might, saying: "Whoever knows how to take and to defend the thing, to him belongs [property]. [...] What I have in my power, that is my own. So long as I assert myself as holder, I am the proprietor of the thing." He adds that "I do not step shyly back from your property, but look upon it always as my property, in which I respect nothing. Pray do the like with what you call my property!" Stirner considers the world and everything in it, including other persons, available to one's taking or use without moral constraint and that rights do not exist in regard to objects and people at all. He sees no rationality in taking the interests of others into account unless doing so furthers one's self-interest, which he believes is the only legitimate reason for acting. He denies society as being an actual entity, calling society a "spook" and that "the individuals are its reality."

Despite being labeled as anarchist, Stirner was not necessarily one. Separation of Stirner and egoism from anarchism was first done in 1914 by Dora Marsden in her debate with Benjamin Tucker in her journals The New Freewoman and The Egoist.

==== Communism ====
Stirner suggested that communism was tainted with the same idealism as Christianity and infused with superstitious ideas like morality and justice. Stirner's principal critique of socialism and communism was that they ignored the individual; they aimed to hand ownership over to the abstraction society, which meant that no existing person actually owned anything.

The Anarchist FAQ writes that "[w]hile some may object to our attempt to place egoism and communism together, it is worth pointing out that Stirner rejected 'communism'. Stirner did not subscribe to libertarian communism, because it did not exist when he was writing and so he was directing his critique against the various forms of state communism which did. Moreover, this does not mean that anarcho-communists and others may not find his work of use to them. And Stirner would have approved, for nothing could be more foreign to his ideas than to limit what an individual considers to be in their best interest." In summarizing Stirner's main arguments, the writers "indicate why social anarchists have been, and should be, interested in his ideas, saying that, John P. Clark presents a sympathetic and useful social anarchist critique of his work in Max Stirner's Egoism."

Daniel Guérin wrote that "Stirner accepted many of the premises of communism but with the following qualification: the profession of communist faith is a first step toward total emancipation of the victims of our society, but they will become completely 'disalienated,' and truly able to develop their individuality, only by advancing beyond communism."

==== Revolution ====
Stirner criticizes conventional notions of revolution, arguing that social movements aimed at overturning established ideals are tacitly idealist because they are implicitly aimed at the establishment of a new ideal thereafter. "Revolution and insurrection must not be looked upon as synonymous. The former consists in an overturning of conditions, of the established condition or status, the State or society, and is accordingly a political or social act; the latter has indeed for its unavoidable consequence a transformation of circumstances, yet does not start from it but from men's discontent with themselves, is not an armed rising, but a rising of individuals, a getting up, without regard to the arrangements that spring from it. The Revolution aimed at new arrangements; insurrection leads us no longer to let ourselves be arranged, but to arrange ourselves, and sets no glittering hopes on 'institutions'. It is not a fight against the established, since, if it prospers, the established collapses of itself; it is only a working forth of me out of the established. If I leave the established, it is dead and passes into decay."

==== Union of egoists ====
Stirner's idea of the union of egoists was first expounded in The Unique and Its Property. The union is understood as a non-systematic association, which Stirner proposed in contradistinction to the state. Unlike a "community" in which individuals are obliged to participate, Stirner's suggested union would be voluntary and instrumental under which individuals would freely associate insofar as others within the union remain useful to each constituent individual. The union relation between egoists is continually renewed by all parties' support through an act of will. Some such as Svein Olav Nyberg argue that the union requires that all parties participate out of a conscious egoism while others such as Sydney E. Parker regard the union as a "change of attitude", rejecting its previous conception as an institution.

=== Response to Hegelianism ===
Scholar Lawrence Stepelevich states that G. W. F. Hegel was a major influence on The Unique and Its Property. While the latter has an "un-Hegelian structure and tone" on the whole and is hostile to Hegel's conclusions about the self and the world, Stepelevich states that Stirner's work is best understood as answering Hegel's question of the role of consciousness after it has contemplated "untrue knowledge" and become "absolute knowledge." Stepelevich concludes that Stirner presents the consequences of rediscovering one's self-consciousness after realizing self-determination.

Scholars such as Douglas Moggach and Widukind De Ridder have stated that Stirner was obviously a student of Hegel, like his contemporaries Ludwig Feuerbach and Bruno Bauer, but this does not necessarily make him a Hegelian. Contrary to the Young Hegelians, Stirner scorned all attempts at an immanent critique of Hegel and the Enlightenment and renounced Bauer and Feuerbach's emancipatory claims as well. Contrary to Hegel, who considered the given as an inadequate embodiment of rational, Stirner leaves the given intact by considering it a mere object, not of transformation, but of enjoyment and consumption ("His Own").

According to Moggach, Stirner does not go beyond Hegel, but he in fact leaves the domain of philosophy in its entirety, stating:

Stirner refused to conceptualize the human self, and rendered it devoid of any reference to rationality or universal standards. The self was moreover considered a field of action, a "never-being I." The "I" had no essence to realize and life itself was a process of self-dissolution. Far from accepting, like the humanist Hegelians, a construal of subjectivity endowed with a universal and ethical mission, Stirner's notion of "the Unique" (Der Einzige) distances itself from any conceptualization whatsoever: "There is no development of the concept of the Unique. No philosophical system can be built out of it, as it can out of Being, or Thinking, or the I. Rather, with it, all development of the concept ceases. The person who views it as a principle thinks that he can treat it philosophically or theoretically and necessarily wastes his breath arguing against it."

== Works ==
=== The False Principle of Our Education ===
In 1842, The False Principle of Our Education (Das unwahre Prinzip unserer Erziehung) was published in Rheinische Zeitung, which was edited by Marx at the time. Written as a reaction to the treatise Humanism vs. Realism, written by Otto Friedrich Theodor Heinsius. Stirner explains that education in either the classical humanist method or the practical realist method still lacks true value. He states that "the final goal of education can no longer be knowledge". Asserting that "only the spirit which understands itself is eternal", Stirner calls for a shift in the principle of education from making us "masters of things" to making us "free natures", naming his educational principle "personalist".

=== Art and Religion ===
Art and Religion (Kunst und Religion) was also published in Rheinische Zeitung on 14 June 1842. It addresses Bruno Bauer and his publication against Hegel called Hegel's Doctrine of Religion and Art Judged From the Standpoint of Faith. Bauer had inverted Hegel's relation between "Art" and "Religion" by claiming that "Art" was much more closely related to "Philosophy" than to "Religion", based on their shared determinacy and clarity, and a common ethical root. However, Stirner went beyond both Hegel and Bauer's criticism by asserting that "Art" rather created an object for "Religion" and could thus by no means be related to what Stirner considered—in opposition with Hegel and Bauer—to be "Philosophy", stating:

[Philosophy] neither stands opposed to an Object, as Religion, nor makes one, as Art, but rather places its pulverizing hand upon all the business of making Objects as well as the whole of objectivity itself, and so breathes the air of freedom. Reason, the spirit of Philosophy, concerns itself only with itself, and troubles itself over no Object.

Stirner deliberately left "Philosophy" out of the dialectical triad (Art–Religion–Philosophy) by claiming that "Philosophy" does not "bother itself with objects" (Religion), nor does it "make an object" (Art). In Stirner's account, "Philosophy" was in fact indifferent towards both "Art" and "Religion." Stirner thus mocked and radicalised Bauer's criticism of religion.

=== The Unique and Its Property ===
Stirner's main work, The Unique and Its Property (Der Einzige und sein Eigentum); also published as The Ego and Its Own; appeared in Leipzig in October 1844, with as year of publication mentioned 1845. In The Unique and Its Property, Stirner launches a radical anti-authoritarian and individualist critique of contemporary Prussian society and modern western society as such. He offers an approach to human existence in which he depicts himself as "the unique one", a "creative nothing", beyond the ability of language to fully express, stating that "[i]f I concern myself for myself, the unique one, then my concern rests on its transitory, mortal creator, who consumes himself, and I may say: All things are nothing to me".

The book proclaims that all religions and ideologies rest on empty concepts. The same holds true for society's institutions that claim authority over the individual, be it the state, legislation, the church, or the systems of education such as universities. Stirner's argument explores and extends the limits of criticism, aiming his critique especially at those of his contemporaries, particularly Ludwig Feuerbach and Bruno Bauer, also at popular ideologies, including communism, humanism (which he regarded as analogous to religion with the abstract Man or humanity as the supreme being), liberalism, and nationalism as well as capitalism, religion and statism, arguing:

In the time of spirits thoughts grew till they overtopped my head, whose offspring they yet were; they hovered about me and convulsed me like fever-phantasies—an awful power. The thoughts had become corporeal on their own account, were ghosts, e. g. God, Emperor, Pope, Fatherland, etc. If I destroy their corporeity, then I take them back into mine, and say: "I alone am corporeal." And now I take the world as what it is to me, as mine, as my property; I refer all to myself.

=== Stirner's Critics ===
Stirner's Critics (Recensenten Stirners) was published in September 1845 in Wigands Vierteljahrsschrift. It is a response, in which Stirner refers to himself in the third person, to three critical reviews of The Unique and Its Property by Moses Hess in Die letzten Philosophen (The Last Philosophers), by a certain Szeliga (alias of an adherent of Bruno Bauer) in an article in the journal Norddeutsche Blätter, and by Ludwig Feuerbach anonymously in an article called On "The Essence of Christianity" in Relation to Stirner's "The Unique and Its Property" (Über "Das Wesen des Christentums" in Beziehung auf Stirners "Der Einzige und sein Eigentum") in Wigands Vierteljahrsschrift.

=== The Philosophical Reactionaries ===
The Philosophical Reactionaries (Die philosophischen Reactionäre) was published in 1847 in Die Epigonen, a journal edited by Otto Wigand from Leipzig. At the time, Wigand had already published The Unique and Its Property and was about to finish the publication of Stirner's translations of Adam Smith and Jean-Baptiste Say. As the subtitle indicates, The Philosophical Reactionaries was written in response to a 1847 article by Kuno Fischer (1824–1907) entitled The Modern Sophists (Die modernen Sophisten). The article was signed G. Edward and its authorship has been disputed ever since John Henry Mackay "cautiously" attributed it to Stirner and included it in his collection of Stirner's lesser writings. It was first translated into English in 2011 by Widukind De Ridder and the introductory note explains:

Mackay based his attribution of this text to Stirner on Kuno Fischer's subsequent reply to it, in which the latter, 'with such determination', identified G. Edward as Max Stirner. The article was entitled 'Ein Apologet der Sophistik und "ein Philosophischer Reactionäre"' and was published alongside 'Die Philosophischen Reactionäre'. Moreover, it seems rather odd that Otto Wigand would have published 'Edward's' piece back-to-back with an article that falsely attributed it to one of his personal associates at the time. And, indeed, as Mackay went on to argue, Stirner never refuted this attribution. This remains, however, a slim basis on which to firmly identify Stirner as the author. This circumstantial evidence has led some scholars to cast doubts over Stirner's authorship, based on both the style and content of 'Die Philosophischen Reactionäre'. One should, however, bear in mind that it was written almost three years after Der Einzige und sein Eigentum, at a time when Young Hegelianism had withered away.

The majority of the text deals with Kuno Fischer's definition of sophism. With much wit, the self-contradictory nature of Fischer's criticism of sophism is exposed. Fischer had made a sharp distinction between sophism and philosophy while at the same time considering it as the "mirror image of philosophy". The sophists breathe "philosophical air" and were "dialectically inspired to a formal volubility". Stirner's answer is striking:

Have you philosophers really no clue that you have been beaten with your own weapons? Only one clue. What can your common sense reply when I dissolve dialectically what you have merely posited dialectically? You have showed me with what kind of 'volubility' one can turn everything to nothing and nothing to everything, black into white and white into black. What do you have against me, when I return to you your pure art?

Looking back on The Unique and Its Property, Stirner claims that "Stirner himself has described his book as, in part, a clumsy expression of what he wanted to say. It is the arduous work of the best years of his life, and yet he calls it, in part, 'clumsy'. That is how hard he struggled with a language that was ruined by philosophers, abused by state-, religious- and other believers, and enabled a boundless confusion of ideas".

=== History of Reaction ===
History of Reaction (Geschichte der Reaktion) was published in two volumes in 1851 by Allgemeine Deutsche Verlags-Anstalt and immediately banned in Austria. It was written in the context of the recent 1848 revolutions in German states and is mainly a collection of the works of others selected and translated by Stirner. The introduction and some additional passages were Stirner's work. Edmund Burke and Auguste Comte are quoted to show two opposing views of revolution.

== Critical reception ==
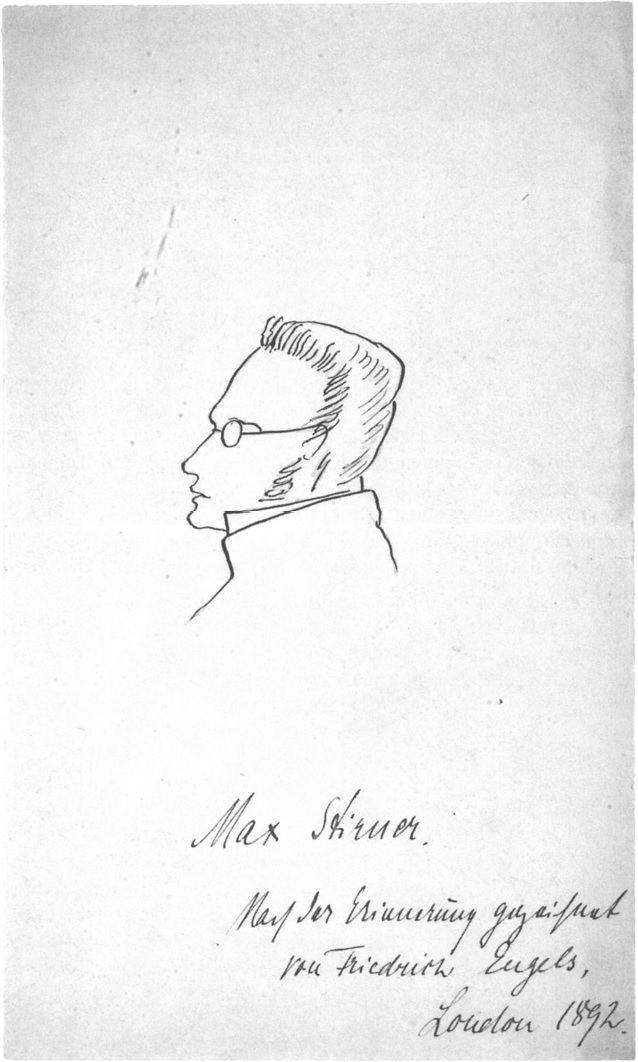
Posthumous sketch of Stirner by Engels for Mackay's 1892 biography, the second of the two surviving portraits of Stirner

Stirner's work did not go unnoticed among his contemporaries. Stirner's attacks on ideology—in particular Feuerbach's humanism—forced Feuerbach into print. Moses Hess (at that time close to Marx) and Szeliga (pseudonym of Franz Zychlin von Zychlinski, an adherent of Bruno Bauer) also replied to Stirner, who answered the criticism in a German periodical in the September 1845 article Stirner's Critics (Recensenten Stirners), which clarifies several points of interest to readers of the book—especially in relation to Feuerbach.

While Marx's Saint Max (Sankt Max), a large part of The German Ideology (Die Deutsche Ideologie), was not published until 1932 and thus assured The Unique and Its Property a place of curious interest among Marxist readers, Marx's ridicule of Stirner has played a significant role in the preservation of Stirner's work in popular and academic discourse despite lacking mainstream popularity.

=== Comments by contemporaries ===
Twenty years after the appearance of Stirner's book, the author Friedrich Albert Lange wrote the following:

Stirner went so far in his notorious work, 'Der Einzige und Sein Eigenthum' (1845), as to reject all moral ideas. Everything that in any way, whether it be external force, belief, or mere idea, places itself above the individual and his caprice, Stirner rejects as a hateful limitation of himself. What a pity that to this book—the extremest that we know anywhere—a second positive part was not added. It would have been easier than in the case of Schelling's philosophy; for out of the unlimited Ego I can again beget every kind of Idealism as my will and my idea. Stirner lays so much stress upon the will, in fact, that it appears as the root force of human nature. It may remind us of Schopenhauer.

Some people believe that in a sense a "second positive part" was soon to be added, though not by Stirner, but by Friedrich Nietzsche. The relationship between Nietzsche and Stirner seems to be much more complicated. According to George J. Stack's Lange and Nietzsche, Nietzsche read Lange's History of Materialism "again and again" and was therefore very familiar with the passage regarding Stirner.

== Influence ==
While Der Einzige was a critical success and attracted much reaction from famous philosophers after publication, it was out of print and the notoriety that it had provoked had faded many years before Stirner's death. However, since his death, it has seen a revival in publication in multiple languages. Stirner had a destructive impact on left-Hegelianism, but his philosophy was a significant influence on Marx and his magnum opus became a founding text of individualist anarchism. Edmund Husserl once warned a small audience about the "seducing power" of Der Einzige, but he never mentioned it in his writing. As the art critic and Stirner admirer Herbert Read observed, the book has remained "stuck in the gizzard" of Western culture since it first appeared.

Many thinkers have read and been affected by The Unique and Its Property in their youth including Rudolf Steiner, Gustav Landauer, Victor Serge, Carl Schmitt and Jürgen Habermas. Few openly admit any influence on their own thinking. Ernst Jünger's book Eumeswil, had the character of the Anarch, based on Stirner's Einzige. Some have tried to use Stirner's ideas to defend capitalism while others have used them to argue for anarcho-syndicalism. Jacob Blumenfeld writes that "Stirner has been variously characterised as: a left-Hegelian; a petit-bourgeois ideologue; a solipsist; a nihilist; the first poststructuralist; an existentialist; an individualist anarchist; a proto right libertarian; a fascist; and as simply insane".

Several other authors, philosophers and artists have cited, quoted or otherwise referred to Max Stirner. They include Albert Camus in The Rebel (the section on Stirner is omitted from the majority of English editions including Penguin's), Benjamin Tucker, James Huneker, Dora Marsden, Renzo Novatore, Emma Goldman, Georg Brandes, John Cowper Powys, Martin Buber, Sidney Hook, Robert Anton Wilson, Horst Matthai, Frank Brand, Marcel Duchamp, several writers of the Situationist International including Raoul Vaneigem and Max Ernst. Oscar Wilde's The Soul of Man Under Socialism has caused some historians to speculate that Wilde (who could read German) was familiar with the book.

=== Anarchist movement ===
Stirner's philosophy was important in the development of modern anarchist thought, particularly individualist anarchism and egoist anarchism. Although Stirner is usually associated with individualist anarchism, he was influential to many social anarchists such as anarcha-feminists Emma Goldman and Federica Montseny. In European individualist anarchism, he influenced its major proponents after him such as Émile Armand, Han Ryner, Renzo Novatore, John Henry Mackay, Miguel Giménez Igualada and Lev Chernyi.

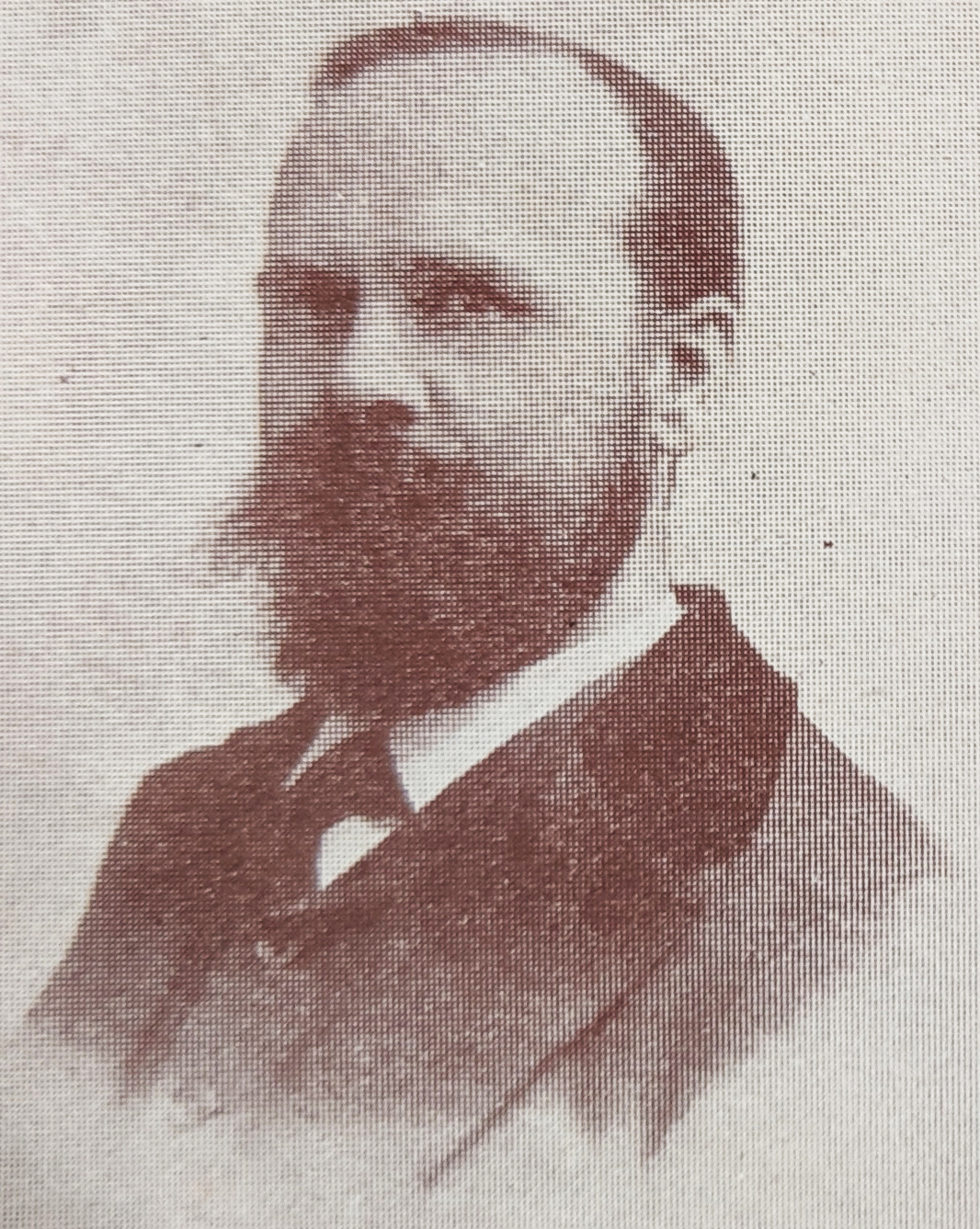
Benjamin Tucker, pioneer of individualist anarchism

In American individualist anarchism, he found adherence in Benjamin Tucker and his magazine Liberty while these abandoned natural rights positions for egoism. Several periodicals "were undoubtedly influenced by Liberty's presentation of egoism". They included I, published by Clarence Lee Swartz and edited by William Walstein Gordak and J. William Lloyd (all associates of Liberty); and The Ego and The Egoist, both of which were edited by Edward H. Fulton. Among the egoist papers that Tucker followed, there were the German Der Eigene, edited by Adolf Brand; and The Eagle and The Serpent, issued from London. The latter, the most prominent English-language egoist journal, was published from 1898 to 1900 with the subtitle A Journal of Egoistic Philosophy and Sociology. Other American egoist anarchists around the early 20th century include James L. Walker, George Schumm, John Beverley Robinson, Steven T. Byington.

In the United Kingdom, Herbert Read was influenced by Stirner and noted the closeness of Stirner's egoism to existentialism (see existentialist anarchism). Later in the 1960s, Daniel Guérin says in Anarchism: From Theory to Practice that Stirner "rehabilitated the individual at a time when the philosophical field was dominated by Hegelian anti-individualism and most reformers in the social field had been led by the misdeeds of bourgeois egotism to stress its opposite" and pointed to "the boldness and scope of his thought". In the 1970s, an American Situationist collective called For Ourselves published a book called The Right To Be Greedy: Theses On The Practical Necessity Of Demanding Everything in which they advocate a "communist egoism" basing themselves on Stirner.

Later in the United States, it emerged the tendency of post-left anarchy which was influenced profoundly by Stirner in aspects such as the critique of ideology. Jason McQuinn says that "when I (and other anti-ideological anarchists) criticize ideology, it is always from a specifically critical, anarchist perspective rooted in both the skeptical, individualist-anarchist philosophy of Max Stirner". Bob Black and Feral Faun/Wolfi Landstreicher strongly adhere to Stirnerist egoism. In the hybrid of post-structuralism and anarchism called post-anarchism, Saul Newman has written on Stirner and his similarities to post-structuralism. Insurrectionary anarchism also has an important relationship with Stirner as can be seen in the work of Wolfi Landstreicher and Alfredo Bonanno who has also written on him in works such as Max Stirner and Max Stirner and Anarchism.

==== Free love, homosexuals and feminists ====
German Stirnerist Adolf Brand produced the homosexual periodical Der Eigene in 1896. This was the first ongoing homosexual publication in the world and ran until 1931. The name was taken from the writings of Stirner (who had greatly influenced the young Brand) and refers to Stirner's concept of "self-ownership" of the individual. Another early homosexual activist influenced by Stirner was John Henry Mackay. Feminists influenced by Stirner include anarchist Emma Goldman, as well as Dora Marsden who founded the journals The Freewoman, The New Freewoman, and The Egoist. Stirner also influenced free love and polyamory propagandist Émile Armand in the context of French individualist anarchism of the early 20th century which is known for "[t]he call of nudist naturism, the strong defense of birth control methods, the idea of "unions of egoists" with the sole justification of sexual practices".

==== Post-structuralism ====
In his book Specters of Marx, influential French poststructuralist thinker Jacques Derrida dealt with Stirner and his relationship with Marx while also analysing Stirner's concept of "specters" or "spooks". Gilles Deleuze, another key thinker associated with post-structuralism, mentions Stirner briefly in his book The Logic of Sense. Saul Newman calls Stirner a proto-poststructuralist who on the one hand had essentially anticipated modern post-structuralists such as Foucault, Lacan, Deleuze and Derrida, but on the other had already transcended them, thus providing what they were unable to—i.e. a ground for a non-essentialist critique of present liberal capitalist society. This is particularly evident in Stirner's identification of the self with a "creative nothing", a thing that cannot be bound by ideology, inaccessible to representation in language.

=== Karl Marx and Friedrich Engels ===
Friedrich Engels commented on Stirner in poetry at the time of Die Freien:

Look at Stirner, look at him, the peaceful enemy of all constraint.
For the moment, he is still drinking beer,
Soon he will be drinking blood as though it were water.
When others cry savagely "down with the kings"
Stirner immediately supplements "down with the laws also."
Stirner full of dignity proclaims;
You bend your willpower and you dare to call yourselves free.
You become accustomed to slavery
Down with dogmatism, down with law.

Engels once even recalled at how they were "great friends" (Duzbrüder). In November 1844, Engels wrote a letter to Karl Marx in which he first reported a visit to Moses Hess in Cologne and then went on to note that during this visit Hess had given him a press copy of a new book by Stirner, The Unique and Its Property. In his letter to Marx, Engels promised to send a copy of the book to him, for it certainly deserved their attention as Stirner "had obviously, among the 'Free Ones', the most talent, independence and diligence." To begin with, Engels was enthusiastic about the book and expressed his opinions freely in letters to Marx:

But what is true in his principle, we, too, must accept. And what is true is that before we can be active in any cause we must make it our own, egoistic cause—and that in this sense, quite aside from any material expectations, we are communists in virtue of our egoism, that out of egoism we want to be human beings and not merely individuals.

Later, Marx and Engels wrote a major criticism of Stirner's work. The number of pages Marx and Engels devote to attacking Stirner in the unexpurgated text of The German Ideology exceeds the total of Stirner's written works. In the book Stirner is derided as Sankt Max (Saint Max) and as Sancho (a reference to Cervantes' Sancho Panza). As Isaiah Berlin has described it, Stirner "is pursued through five hundred pages of heavy-handed mockery and insult." The book was written in 1845–1846, but it was not published until 1932. Marx's lengthy ferocious polemic against Stirner has since been considered an important turning point in Marx's intellectual development from idealism to materialism. It has been argued that historical materialism was Marx's method of reconciling communism with a Stirnerite rejection of morality.

=== Possible influence on Friedrich Nietzsche ===
The ideas of Stirner and Friedrich Nietzsche have often been compared and many authors have discussed apparent similarities in their writings, sometimes raising the question of influence. During the early years of Nietzsche's emergence as a well-known figure in Germany, the only thinker discussed in connection with his ideas more often than Stirner was Arthur Schopenhauer. It is certain that Nietzsche read about The Unique and Its Property, which was mentioned in Friedrich Albert Lange's History of Materialism and Karl Robert Eduard von Hartmann's Philosophy of the Unconscious, both of which Nietzsche knew well. However, there is no indication that he actually read it as no mention of Stirner is known to exist anywhere in Nietzsche's publications, papers or correspondence. In 2002, a biographical discovery revealed it is probable that Nietzsche had encountered Stirner's ideas before he read Hartmann and Lange in October 1865, when he met with Eduard Mushacke, an old friend of Stirner's during the 1840s.

As soon as Nietzsche's work began to reach a wider audience, the question of whether he owed a debt of influence to Stirner was raised. As early as 1891 when Nietzsche was still alive, though incapacitated by mental illness, Hartmann went so far as to suggest that he had plagiarized Stirner. By the turn of the century, the belief that Nietzsche had been influenced by Stirner was so widespread that it became something of a commonplace at least in Germany, prompting one observer to note in 1907 that "Stirner's influence in modern Germany has assumed astonishing proportions, and moves in general parallel with that of Nietzsche. The two thinkers are regarded as exponents of essentially the same philosophy."

From the beginning of what was characterized as "great debate" regarding Stirner's possible positive influence on Nietzsche, serious problems with the idea were nonetheless noted. By the middle of the 20th century, if Stirner was mentioned at all in works on Nietzsche, the idea of influence was often dismissed outright or abandoned as unanswerable. However, the idea that Nietzsche was influenced in some way by Stirner continues to attract a significant minority, perhaps because it seems necessary to explain the oft-noted (though arguably superficial) similarities in their writings. In any case, the most significant problems with the theory of possible Stirner influence on Nietzsche are not limited to the difficulty in establishing whether the one man knew of or read the other. They also consist in determining if Stirner in particular might have been a meaningful influence on a man as widely read as Nietzsche.

=== Rudolf Steiner ===
The individualist anarchist orientation of Rudolf Steiner's early philosophy—before he turned to theosophy around 1900—has strong parallels to and was admittedly influenced by Stirner's conception of the ego, for which Steiner claimed to have provided a philosophical foundation.

== See also ==
- Alterity
- Anarchism in Germany
- Antihumanism
- Contemporary anarchism
- Difference (philosophy)
- Différance
- Egoist anarchism
- Enlightened self-interest
- Ethical solipsism
- Hauntology
- Individualist anarchism
- Individualist anarchism in Europe
- Other (philosophy)
