= Henry Appleton (anarchist) =

American individualist anarchist

Henry Appleton was a 19th-century American individualist anarchist. He was an editorial assistant to Benjamin Tucker and a significant contributor to Liberty during which he gained a reputation as an exceptional writer. Appleton was a graduate of Brown University and resided in Providence, Rhode Island. He is remembered as "the most forceful critic of anarchist communism in the early 1880s".

== Anarchism and communism ==
Appleton believed that anarchism was the philosophical basis of a method in sociology and should be considered as such. Anarchism as according to Appleton was neither theory nor institute but the logical outcome of the Progressive movement. Appleton also believed that the state and the church was intertwined and that the church, in particular, was essential for upholding the state.

Appleton was a staunch critic of anarcho-communism believing it to be just communism, masquerading as anarchism and viewed those aligned with anarcho-communism to be at war with liberty. Writing under the pseudonym ‘X,’ he would attack the communist anarchist leader Johann Most, decrying him to be a "State Socialist", posed a question to him of how someone who is of a peaceful stance would be treated if they were to disagree with his economic ideas and claimed that he and his followers wished to destroy all existing institutions and then build their own utopia. Appleton believed if he did not comply with Most's ideas all he had created would be "declared the property of the Commune."

== Career ==
In 1885, English anarchist Henry Seymour published works by Appleton in The Anarchist, a four-page monthly periodical.

In 1886, Appleton became editor of The Newsman, published by the Mutual News Company of Boston. While his friend and fellow writer of liberty Benjamin Tucker congratulated Appleton he disagreed with the acceptance and use of the political means of achieving social goals. This led to a conflict of interests within Liberty which would ultimately cause Appleton to withdraw.
