= Enzo Martucci =

Italian poet

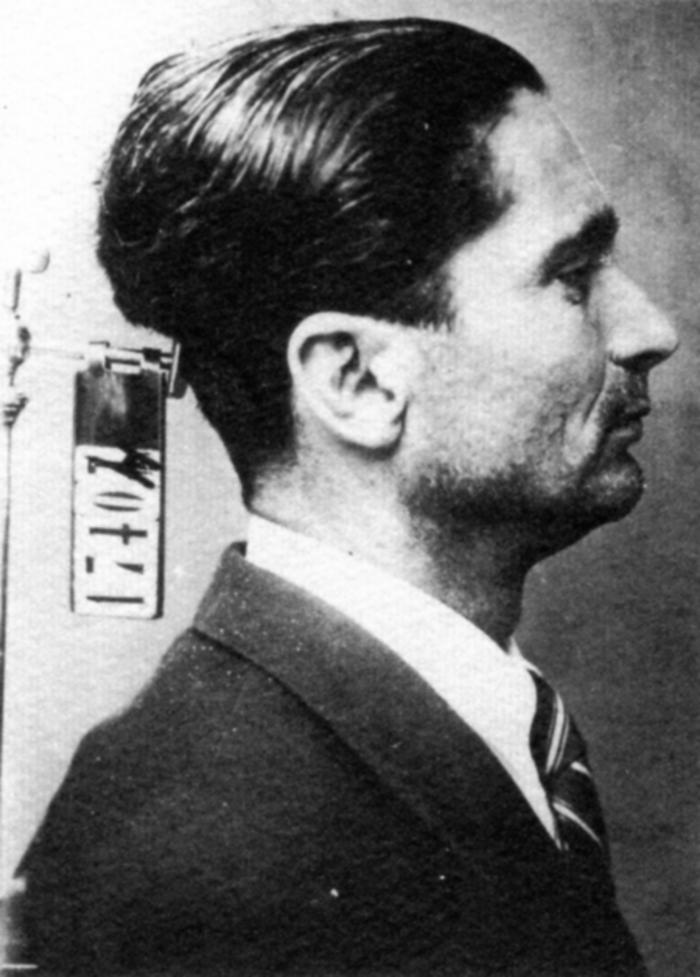
- Born: 20 March 1904; Caserta, Italy
- Died: 17 July 1975 (aged 71); Atri, Italy
- Era: 20th-century

Enzo Martucci (20 March 1904 – 17 July 1975) was an Italian individualist anarchist and illegalist philosopher as well as poet, best known for his books In Praise of Chaos and The Red Sect, and for being friends with Renzo Novatore.

== Biography ==
=== Life ===
Vincenzo Martucci was born in Caserta, Campania, Italy on March 20 1904. He ran away from home at 16 and left his studies. He wandered around Italy where he met Renzo Novatore, an Italian poet and individualist anarchist philosopher. Enzo became very influenced by Renzos ideas. He was known to get frequently stopped by the police, and was arrested three times.

=== Conflicts with the law ===
In 1920, Martucci was arrested for his radical outbursts. He was later released in 1921. In 1937, he was arrested for "professing and propagating anarchist ideas." And was sentenced to a five-year long internal exile. In 1943, he was charged with theft, but tried to reason with the police claiming he had information about an anti-fascist coup. After investigation, the police found out Martucci had lied about the coup, he recanted his statement, and was sentenced to two years and six months in prison for criminal slander.

=== Death ===
Martucci died of natural causes in Atri, Italy on July 17 1975 at the age of 71.

== Works ==
- In Praise of Chaos
- The Damned Song
- Heroic Spring
- In Defense of Stirner
- Neither Prison, No Policemen
- On Renzo Novatore
- Unbridled Freedom
- The Red Sect
