= Marie Dähnhardt =

German intellectual

Marie Wilhelmine Dähnhardt (1 June 1818 – 1902), the daughter of an apothecary, was a German intellectual, for some time associated with the Berlin debating club Die Freien.

== Biography ==
Dähnhardt was born on 1 June 1818 in Gadebusch (now Mecklenburg-Western Pomerania, Germany). She was the daughter of the apothecary Helmuth Ludwig Dähnhardt and his wife Maria (née Brünger). Her family was from a bourgeois background and she enjoyed a good education in her youth. Early in her life her father died and she inherited a small fortune of 10,000 thalers.

No later than in 1838 she moved to Berlin against the will of her family, where she associated at Hippel's wine bar with Die Freien which is probably where she met her future husband, the Young Hegelian anarchist philosopher Max Stirner, one of the forerunners of individualist anarchism. During her time in Berlin she used to, in contrast to her bourgeois and well-mannered upbringing, smoke cigars, play billiards, drink the Munich beer and dress in male attire in order to visit brothels.

She was married to Max Stirner from 1843 to 1846. After divorcing she moved to London, where she worked as a teacher under the protection of Lady Bunsen, the wife of the Prussian embassador.

Later in 1852 or 1853 she emigrated to Melbourne, Australia, where she made a living as a washerwoman. After returning to England she joined a Catholic commune, where she was found by Stirner's biographer John Henry Mackay, but refused to talk about her ex-husband and claimed "Stirner was a very sly man whom [she] had neither respected nor loved", and claiming that their relationship together had been more of a cohabitation than a marriage. She died in the beginning of 1902 in London.
