= Renzo Novatore =

Italian poet & philosopher (1890–1922)

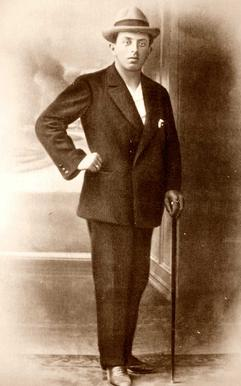
- Born: May 12, 1890; Arcola, Liguria, Italy
- Died: November 29, 1922 (aged 32); Genoa, Italy

Philosophical work
- Era: 20th-century philosophy
- Region: Western Philosophy
- School: Individualist anarchism, Egoist anarchism, Futurism, Existentialism
- Main interests: The individual, ethics, nihilism
- Notable ideas: The creative nothing

Abele Ricieri Ferrari (May 12, 1890 – November 29, 1922), better known by the pen name Renzo Novatore, was an Italian individualist anarchist, illegalist and anti-fascist poet, philosopher and militant, now mostly known for his posthumously published book Toward the Creative Nothing (Verso il nulla creatore) and associated with ultra-modernist trends of futurism. His thought was influenced by Max Stirner, Friedrich Nietzsche, Georges Palante, Oscar Wilde, Henrik Ibsen, Arthur Schopenhauer and Charles Baudelaire.

== Biography ==
=== Background ===
Abele Ricieri Ferrari was born in Arcola, Liguria, Italy on May 12, 1890, in a poor peasant family. He did not adjust to school discipline and quit in the first year, never coming back after that. While he worked in his father's farm, he self-educated with an emphasis on poetry and philosophy. Around his town, he was surrounded by a vibrant anarchist scene, which he started to come close to.

=== Writing and action ===
He discovered Max Stirner, Errico Malatesta, Peter Kropotkin, Henrik Ibsen, and Friedrich Nietzsche, whom Novatore often quoted. From 1908 on, he embraced individualist anarchism. In 1910, he was charged with the burning of a local church and spent three months in prison, but his participation in the fire was never proven. A year later, he went on the run for several months because the police wanted him for theft and robbery. On September 30, 1911, the police arrested him for vandalism. He justified refusal of work and he thought, in his personal philosophy of life, that he had the right to expropriate from the rich what he needed for his daily survival, and using force wasn't a problem for him.

In 1914, he began to write for anarchist papers. He was drafted in 1912 but quickly discharged for unknown causes. As the Great War approached he deserted his regiment on April 26, 1918, and was sentenced to death by a military tribunal for desertion and high treason on October 31. He left his village and fled, propagating the desertion from the Army and the armed uprising against the state. Novatore was married with two children at the time and when his younger son died in the last months of 1918, Novatore came back to his home, risking arrest only to give him a last goodbye.

He was involved in an anarcho-futurist collective in La Spezia which he led (along with Auro d'Arcola) to be active in the militant anti-fascist Arditi del Popolo. He was close friends with Enzo Martucci and Bruno Filippi. Renzo Novatore wrote for many anarchist papers (Cronaca Libertaria, Il Libertario, Iconoclastal, Gli Scamiciati, Nichilismo, Pagine Libere) where he debated with other anarchists (among them Camillo Berneri). He published a magazine, Vertice, which has been lost apart from few articles. Novatore collaborated in the individualist anarchist journal Iconoclasta! alongside the young Stirnerist illegalist Bruno Filippi.

=== Death ===
In May 1919, the city of La Spezia fell under the control of a self-proclaimed Revolutionary Committee, and Novatore fought alongside it. On June 30, 1919, he was hidden in a hut in the country near the city of Sarzana. A farmer told the police about him, and he was sentenced to ten years in prison, but was released in a general amnesty a few months later. He decided to go underground as fascism rose in Italy, and in 1922, he joined the gang of the famous robber of anarchist inspiration Sante Pollastro.

Novatore was killed in an ambush by carabinieri in Teglia, near Genoa, on November 29, 1922, while with Pollastro, but Pollastro managed to escape. On Novatore's body, the detectives found some false documents, a Browning gun with two full magazines, one hand grenade, and a ring with a secret container filled with a lethal dose of cyanide.

== Influence ==
The notorious Italo-Argentinian anarchist Severino Di Giovanni dedicated a poem to Novatore shortly after knowing about his death. Later he will establish the "Anarcho-individualist Group Renzo Novatore" which enters the “Italian Anti-fascist Alliance” in Argentina.

Renzo Novatore has received attention recently in anarcho-Nihilism and insurrectionary anarchism as can be seen in the writings of Wolfi Landstreicher. In his introduction to "Towards the Creative Nothing" by Renzo Novatore, Landstreicher writes "It is difficult to find anarchist works in English that are at the same time "individualist" and explicitly revolutionary, that emphasize the centrality of the aim of individual self-determination to a revolution that will "communalize material wealth" as it will "individualize spiritual wealth". For this and other reasons, I chose to translate Toward the Creative Nothing by Renzo Novatore and publish several of his shorter pieces." In an article called "Whither now? Some thoughts on creating anarchy" Wolfi Landstreicher writing as Feral Faun says "Then we can cease to be merely on the margins of society and will each, as unique wild beings, become the center of an insurrectionary project that may destroy civilization and create a world in which we freely live, relate and create as our unique desires move us. We will become – to quote Renzo Novatore again – "a shadow eclipsing any form of society which can exist under the sun."

== Bibliography ==
- Novatore, Renzo. Toward the Creative Nothing. (The Anarchist Library)
- Novatore, Renzo (2012). The Collected Writings of Renzo Novatore. San Francisco, California: Ardent Press.

== See also ==
- Individualist anarchism in Europe
- Anarchism in Italy
- Bruno Filippi
- Biennio rosso
- Illegalism
- Post-left anarchism
- Anarchism and Friedrich Nietzsche

== Sources ==
- Berghaus, Günter (1998). Italian Futurist Theatre, 1909–1944. Oxford: Clarendon Press. ISBN 0-19-815898-X.
- Feral Faun (November–December 1989). "Whither now?". Anarchy: A Journal of Desire Armed (22). Archived from the original on March 18, 2009.
