= Bruno Filippi =

Italian anarchist (1900–1919)

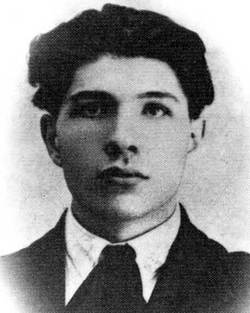
Bruno Filippi

Bruno Filippi (30 March 1900 – 7 September 1919) was an Italian individualist anarchist writer and activist who collaborated in the Italian individualist anarchist magazine Iconoclasta! alongside Renzo Novatore.

== Life and writings ==
Filippi was born in Livorno, into a large family, the first of six brothers, and his father was a typographer. His family moved to Milan when he was still a child and in 1915, he already had trouble with the local police forces. That same year, he was arrested during an anti-militarist demonstration where he had a warm gun without bullets.

While still an adolescent, he discovered the philosophy of Max Stirner and so he embraced it. Filippi was a regular contributor to the Italian individualist anarchist journal Iconoclasta! where he collaborated with the notorious individualist anarchist Renzo Novatore. In 1920, the editors of the paper printed a booklet with many of his articles entitled Posthumous Writings of Bruno Filippi.

After the war, in 1919, the biennio rosso events exploded in which he participated. On 7 September 1919, he died in Milan, while trying to explode a bomb directed at a meeting of the richest people in the city. Renzo Novatore wrote an article dedicated to him called "In the Circle of Life. In Memory of Bruno Filippi". There, he said that Filippi "immolated himself in a fruitful embrace with death because he madly loved Life. We have the need and the entitlement to say of him that which was said of the D'Annunzian hero: “That the slaves of the marketplace turn around and remember!”"

== Legacy and influence ==
The Italian anarchist Belgrado Pedrini, among others, in the mid 1970s set up at Carrara the Circolo Anarchico Bruno Filippi. Pedrini later reprinted the writings of Filippi under the title L’Iconoclasta (1978).

Contemporary American insurrectionary anarchist Wolfi Landstreicher translated some of his writings into English in a collection he titled The Rebel's Dark Laughter: The Writings of Bruno Filippi. Landstreicher says about Filippi that "His essays, stories and prose poems show no mercy for either domination or subservience in any form, and he was as harsh in his assessment of the slaves who resigned themselves to their slavery as to the masters who exploited and oppressed them. He could be faulted, like — Renzo Novatore, for his lack of class analysis. But when watching the masses of the poor and working people go out without protest to slaughter each other at the orders of their masters, it must have been difficult for the few who did refuse this slaughter not to be disgusted by such sheep — like behavior. In 1919, when there was an uprising in Italy, Filippi was out there fighting with the insurgents exploited, clear about who the enemy was."

In 2004 Francesco Pellegrino published Libertà estrema. Le ultime ore dell'anarchico Bruno Filippi.

== See also ==
- Anarchism in Italy
- Individualist anarchism in Europe
- Renzo Novatore
- Illegalism
- Post-left anarchism
- Anarchism and Friedrich Nietzsche
