= Internal Exile =

Internal exile may refer to:

- A form of exile in which one is banished to remote part of one's own country rather than being deported
  - Internal exile in Greece, practiced until 1974
- Internal Exile (Fish album), 1991
- Internal Exile (Los Illegals album), 1983
