= Sante Pollastro =

Italian bandit (1899–1979)

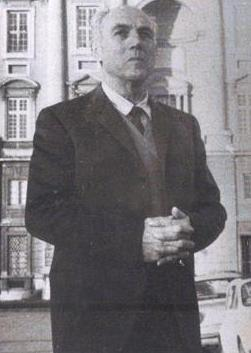
- Pollastro in 1959
- Born: August 14, 1899; Novi Ligure, Italy
- Died: April 30, 1979 (aged 79); Novi Ligure, Italy

Sante Pollastro (1899–1979), also known as Pollastri, was an Italian bandit known in the press for his circle of individualist anarchists.
