= J. William Lloyd =

American individualist anarchist and writer

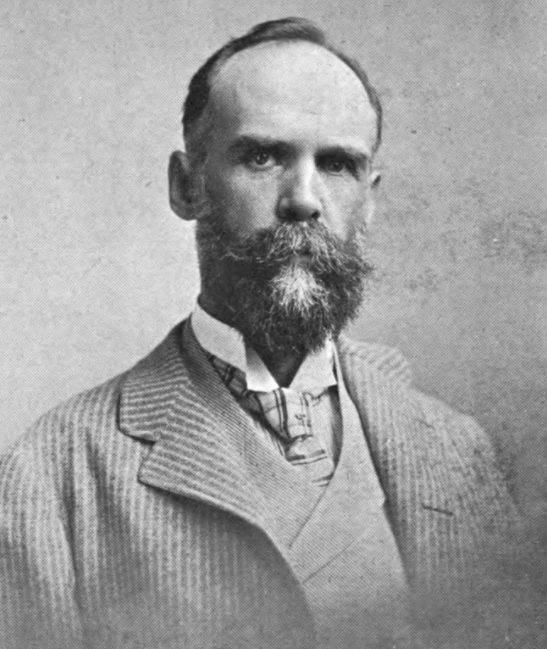
- Born: June 4, 1857; Westfield, New Jersey
- Died: October 23, 1940 (aged 83)
- Occupations: Anarchist, writer

J. William Lloyd (never using his given name John) (June 4, 1857 – October 23, 1940) was an American individualist anarchist, mystic and pantheist. Lloyd later modified his political position to minarchism.

== Biography ==
He was born in Westfield, New Jersey; he later moved to Kansas, then Iowa, then to experimental colonies in Tennessee and Florida, before returning to New Jersey in 1888. He based his anarchism upon natural law, rather than on egoism as Benjamin Tucker did. His first book, "Wind-Harp Songs" (poetry), was published in 1895 ("Anarchists' March," a printed musical score with words by Lloyd, had been issued by Tucker in 1888). He founded an anarchist group, The Comradeship of Free Socialists, in 1897. His work, "The Red Heart in a White World: A Suggestive Manual of Free Society; Containing a Method and a Hope," formed the basis for it.

His life changed when in that year, reading Edward Carpenter while riding on a train to N.Y., he experienced "Cosmic Consciousness" (R.M. Bucke devoted a chapter to Lloyd in his 1901 book of that title). This inspired his book, "Dawn-Thought on the Reconciliation: a Volume of Pantheistic Impressions and Glimpses of Larger Religion" (1900).

He founded his magazine, "The Free Comrade," which first ran from 1900 to 1902. There he championed anarchism, free love, Whitman ("Our American Shakespeare, and greater than he") and Edward Carpenter ("The greatest man of modern England"). In 1902 and 1904 were published his two utopian novels, "The Natural Man: A Romance of the Golden Age" and "The Dwellers in Vale Sunrise: How They Got Together and Lived Happy Ever After. A Sequel to 'The Natural Man,' Being an Account of the Tribes of Him."

The Free Comrade resumed publication in a new series, which ran from 1910 to 1912. Lloyd now co-edited it with his friend Leonard D. Abbott, who financed its publication. Between the end of the original series and the beginning of the new, Lloyd had stopped considering himself a pure anarchist, indeed joining the Socialist Party ("I am still anarchistic in the essential sense.... the great need of Socialism is a stronger infusion of Anarchism...."). Meanwhile his friend Abbott had moved from socialism towards anarchism. They saw the new series "as an advocate of the juncture of the Anarchist and Socialist forces."

Lloyd's writings appeared in Benjamin Tucker's "Liberty"; in Moses Harman's anarchist and free love journal, "Lucifer the Light Bearer"; the anarchist and sex-radical newspaper "Fair Play"; the anarchist paper "Free Society," Horace Traubel's "Conservator"; etc. He had a column in "Ariel," published by the Christian Socialist George Littlefield.

He wrote hundreds of poems, many of which appeared in anarchist periodicals.

He wrote many books. Besides those listed above, they include "Aw-Aw Tam Indian Nights: Being the Myths and Legends of the Pimas of Arizona" (1911); "Karezza Method," a sex manual (first published clandestinely ca. 1918); "Eneres," published by Allen & Unwin in 1929 and Houghton Mifflin in 1930, with an introduction by Havelock Ellis; and at least 14 other works, mostly poetry.

In "Edward Carpenter: In Appreciation," edited by Gilbert Beith (Allen & Unwin, 1931), Will S. Monroe wrote, "Carpenter's most devoted American disciple is J. William Lloyd, who did more than any other follower in the United States (Ernest Crosby excepted) to familiarize our countrymen with his doctrines."

He contrasted his idea of free love to that of "the artistic free-lovers, the Bohemians": "My view of sex is religious, I might almost say, touched with austerity. Sex and love to me are sacred and woman their priestess. Sex should not be cultivated as a sybaritic indulgence, but with reference always to spiritual uplift, mental inspiration, physical health, individual fulfillment and racial progress-- always with reference to higher uses." (Free Comrade, July 1910).

Lloyd supported the Allies in World War I. He moved to California in 1922. In the 1930s he promoted the ideas of Edward Bellamy. But throughout his life he maintained friendly relations with former associates. He died in 1940.

Though at times called a "drugless physician," Lloyd never graduated from the water-cure medical college he attended as a young man.

Archival material by Lloyd can be found in the Labadie collection at the University of Michigan and at the von Mises Institute in Auburn, Alabama.

== Sex theorist ==
A sex theorist, Lloyd strongly criticized patriarchy and sexual possessiveness and exclusivity. He viewed the historical fall of Matriarchy as "the great crime," and saw jealousy as akin to monopoly attained by legal power. He developed a concept which he called "The Larger Love." As he wrote in 1929, "In my later twenties I conceived the most beautiful ideal of my whole life; one that has remained with me ever since, thru [sic] all the years, and which I feel is my special message to humanity, my gospel and prophecy for the future.... The Larger Love, actualized, would be a state of human love- and sex-relation in which each human being of adult age, male or female, would normally have a Central Love, that is a mate who in loyalty, tenderness, reliability and fitness would fill the place of the mate in monogamic ideals, excepting that it would be expected and usually occur that each partner in this union would also have one or several Side Lovers, that is, close friends or mates of the opposite sex, whose affection might not express itself sexually, but could do so without any social surprize [sic] or reproach, and probably usually would do so, at least at certain times. This whole group to form affectionally and spiritually a Love Family, or Love Group, socially recognized and approved as such, but not legally bound together in any way. But as each side Lover would also normally have a Central Lover and center another group, it is plain that these love groups would be very closely intertwined and woven together."

His "Karezza Method" advocated sexual intercourse without seminal emission. ("In the highest form and best expression of the art neither man nor woman has or desires to have the orgasm...")

In his Karezza book, Lloyd addresses such concerns as the question of semen buildup. He concluded from examples of sterilized men that semen is absorbed back into the body, if it is not let out.

Lloyd openly questioned the trend toward viewing orgasm as purely beneficial. Concerning the male, he pointed to a standard stockbreeder practice to not let a bull or a stallion serve too many or too often so as not to devitalize him. This practical knowledge of businessmen to him was unbiased evidence on the effects of ejaculation.

Lloyd observed that karezza offered health benefits. For example, he said he knew it to “act like magic in painful menstruation,” and as a remarkable nerve sedative, even curing nervous headache. He also found it one of the best agents “for the benefit and cure of ordinary sexual weaknesses and ailments, including urethritis and prostatitis.”

In successful Karezza the sex-organs become quiet, satisfied, demagnetized, as perfectly as by the orgasm, while the rest of the body of each partner glows with a wonderful vigor and conscious joy ... tending to irradiate the whole being with romantic love; and always with an after-feeling of health, purity and well-being. We are most happy and good-humored as after a full meal.

However, he was “willing to concede that where the intercourse is of such a nature as to cause a congestion that is not sublimated, or where sexual congestion occurs and sublimation and [karezza] are not available, the orgasm may have a necessary place.”

In Lloyd’s day, some people objected to karezza on the grounds that it would encourage excessive indulgence in sexual relations. He responded:

Those who do not use Karezza are vastly more liable to excess, and this usually from too frequent and intense orgasms, too frequent pregnancies, or too coarse, cynical and invasive an attitude. Where there is merely a physical itch or craving gratified, with no mutual tenderness or kindness, or perhaps actually against the desire or protest of one party, sex is always excessive.

Lloyd offered many practical ideas for successful karezza, including the need for lovers to give in order to benefit from controlled intercourse. “Try to feel yourself a magnetic battery,” he advised.

As you acquire the habit of giving your sexual electricity out in blessing to your partner from your sex-organs, hands, lips, skin, eyes and voice, you will acquire the power to satisfy yourself and her without an orgasm. Soon you will not even think of self-control, because you will have no desire for the orgasm, nor will she.

Karezza, said Lloyd, is the greatest beautifier because it increases and makes enduring heart love. He advised that to increase sexual control, “keep the spiritual on top, dominant—loving is the first thing, and at-one-ment ... of your souls, your real end.” “Sex is very close to soul.... [It only satisfies] when it unites souls, not merely copulates bodies for a thrill.”

In a chapter called “Does the Woman Need the Orgasm?” he explained in karezza, the lady “melts” her whole being to her partner and there is not an orgasm in the ordinary definition of the word, yet beneficial physical relaxation also occurs.

He wrote that the full magnetic rapport of karezza occurs when:

Two souls and bodies seem as one, supported and floating on some divine stream in Paradise.... This is the real ideal and end of Karezza. You will finally enter into such unity that in your fullest embrace you can hardly tell yourselves apart and can read each other’s thoughts. You will feel a physical unity as if her blood flowed in your veins, her flesh were yours. For this is the Soul-Blending Embrace.

== Selected publications ==
- The Scripture of the Serene Life (1900)
- The Natural Man: A Romance of the Golden Age (1902)
- Dawn Thought on the Reconciliation (1904)
- Anarchist Socialism by J. William Lloyd
- Speech to Ferrer Colony by J. William Lloyd
- Anarchist Mutualism by J. William Lloyd (1927) - A critical essay, written after abandoning anarchism
- The Karezza Method: Or Magnetation, the Art of Connubial Love (1931) - Manual about the practice of Karezza (controlled intercourse)
- A Brief Sketch of the Life of J. William Lloyd (1940)
