= Alternative Press Review =

American magazine

- Alternative Press Review header
- Editorial collective: Jason McQuinn; Thomas Wheeler; Alan Antliff
- Categories: Alternative media, anarchism
- Frequency: Irregular
- Publisher: AAL Press
- First issue: Fall 1993
- Country: United States
- Based in: Columbia, Missouri
- Language: English
- ISSN: 1072-7299

Alternative Press Review (byline: "Your guide beyond the mainstream") was a libertarian American magazine established in 1993 as a sister periodical to Anarchy: A Journal of Desire Armed. The first issue was published in Fall 1993. As of 2002, its editorial collective consisted of Jason McQuinn (Anarchy), Chuck Munson (Infoshop.org) and Thomas Wheeler (Out of Bounds). Munson was co-editor and reviewer from 1997 to 2003, when he was replaced by Allan Antliff. The magazine was first published by C.A.L. Press and then by AAL Press.

According to its self-description, "The Alternative Press Review is your window on the world of independent media. APR publishes a wide variety of the best essays from radical zines, books, magazines, blogs and web sites. Plus, APR publishes a selection of short and lively article excerpts, along with reviews, commentary and columns on the alternative press scene and other alternative media." In practice the magazine has featured media criticism (e.g. "The Decline of American Journalism" by Daniel Brandt), coverage of resistance movements (e.g. "An Interview with Zapatista Women" by Guio Rovera Sancho), and cultural criticism (e.g. "Immediatism vs. Capitalism" by Hakim Bey, "Flyposter Frenzy" by Matthew Fuller, and "Dark Age: Why Johnny can't Dissent" by Tom Frank). The magazine's chief concerns, according to New Statesman are "sex, other media and the CIA". Contributors to the review have included McQuinn, Noam Chomsky, David Barsamian, Richard Heinberg and Harold Pinter.

The review was described in 1994 by the Atlanta Journal-Constitution as "[c]loser to the edge of the magazine world, and not quite as articulate as the Utne Reader" – the magazine's main rival and market leader. Ian Hargreaves, writing in the New Statesman in 1998, called the magazine "the real rivet-spitter on the block" of alternative media, while a 1999 OC Weekly feature hailed it as "the essential nutrient missing from one’s daily McMedia diet of misinformation and disinformation."

Web-site is defunct since at least 2005.

== See also ==
- List of anarchist periodicals
