= Liberty (anarchist periodical) =

19th-century US anarchist periodical

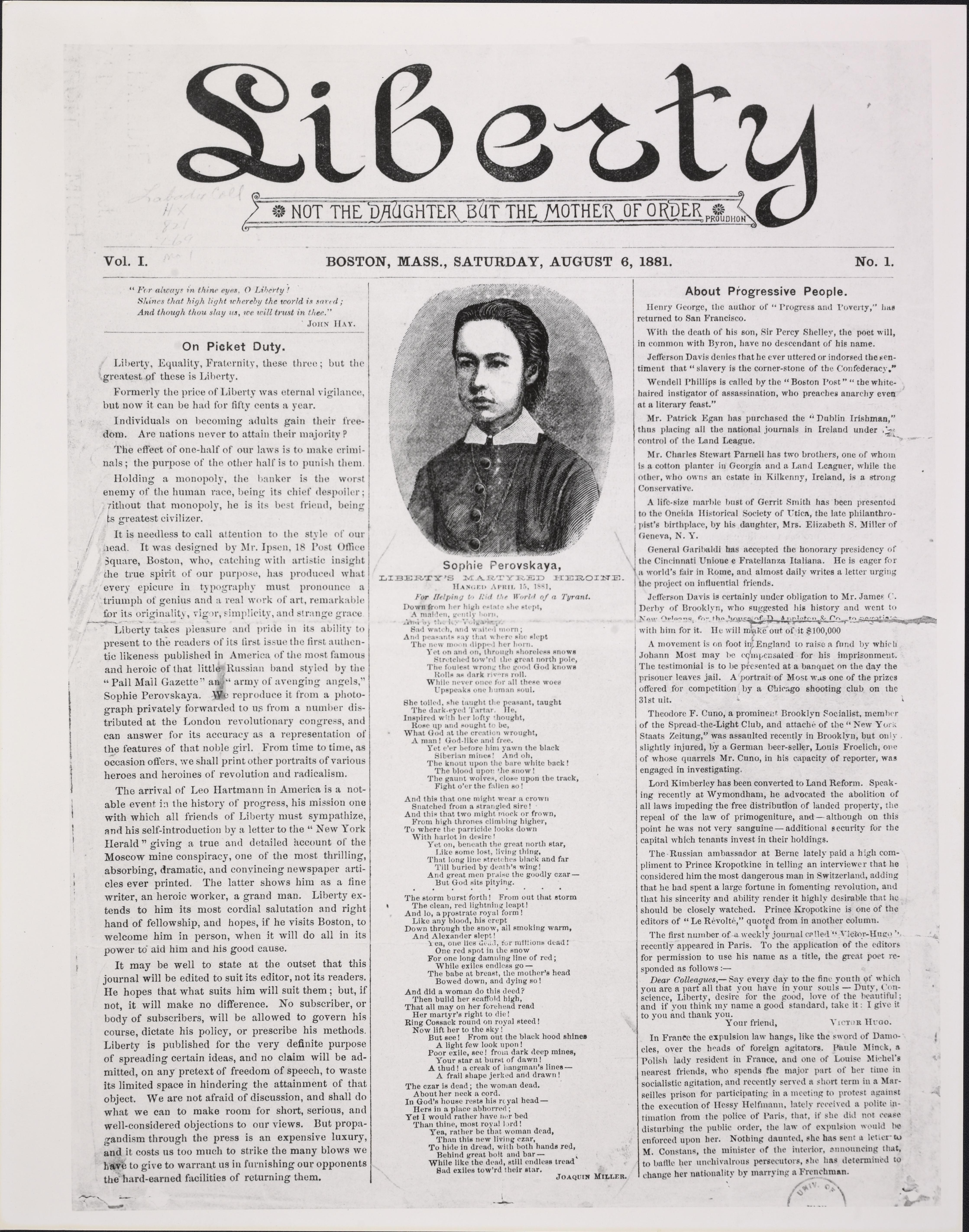
- First issue of Liberty (August 6, 1881)
- Type: Political philosophy
- Format: Biweekly newspaper
- Editor: Benjamin Tucker
- Founded: 1881
- Ceased publication: 1908; 118 years ago
- Political alignment: Anarchism, Libertarian Socialism, Mutualism
- Language: English
- Headquarters: Boston, Massachusetts

Liberty was a 19th-century anarchist market socialist and libertarian socialist periodical which was started in 1881 in the United States by Benjamin Tucker and which was subsequently published by him until 1908.

== See also ==
- Individualist anarchism
- Individualist anarchism in the United States
- List of anarchist periodicals
- Lucifer the Lightbearer (1883–1907)
