= Justus Schwab =

Radical saloon keeper in New York City

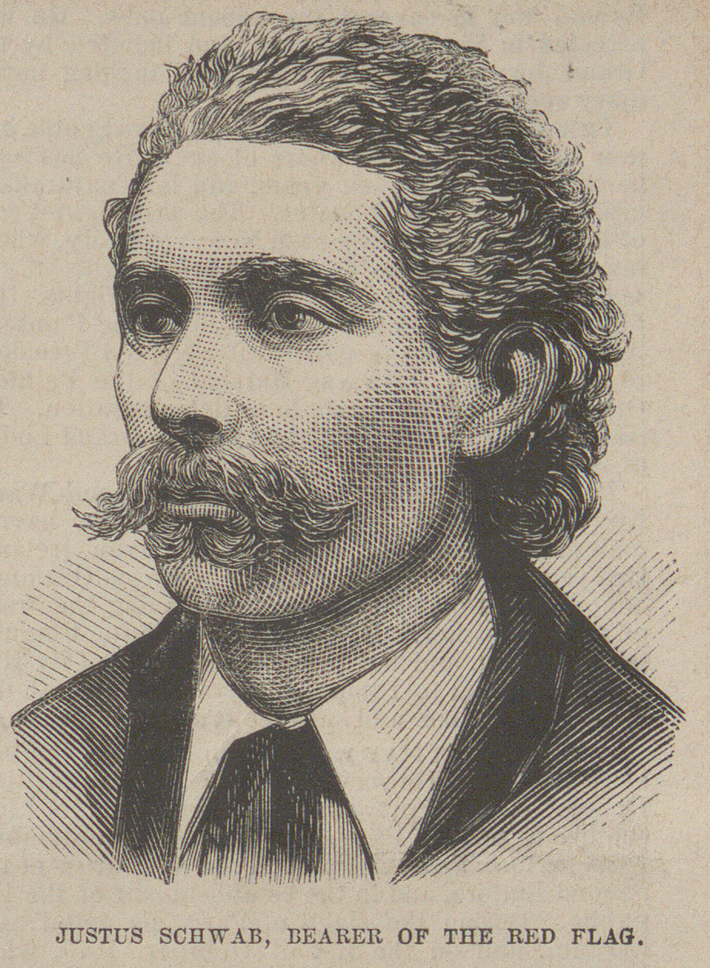
- Born: 1847; Frankfurt-am-Main, Hesse, Germany
- Died: December 17, 1900 (aged 52–53); New York City, United States
- Occupation: Barkeep

Justus H. Schwab (1847–1900) was the keeper of a radical saloon in New York City's Lower East Side. An emigre from Germany, Schwab was involved in early American anarchism in the early 1880s, including the anti-authoritarian New York Social Revolutionary Club's split from the Socialistic Labor Party and Johann Most's entry to the United States.

== Life ==
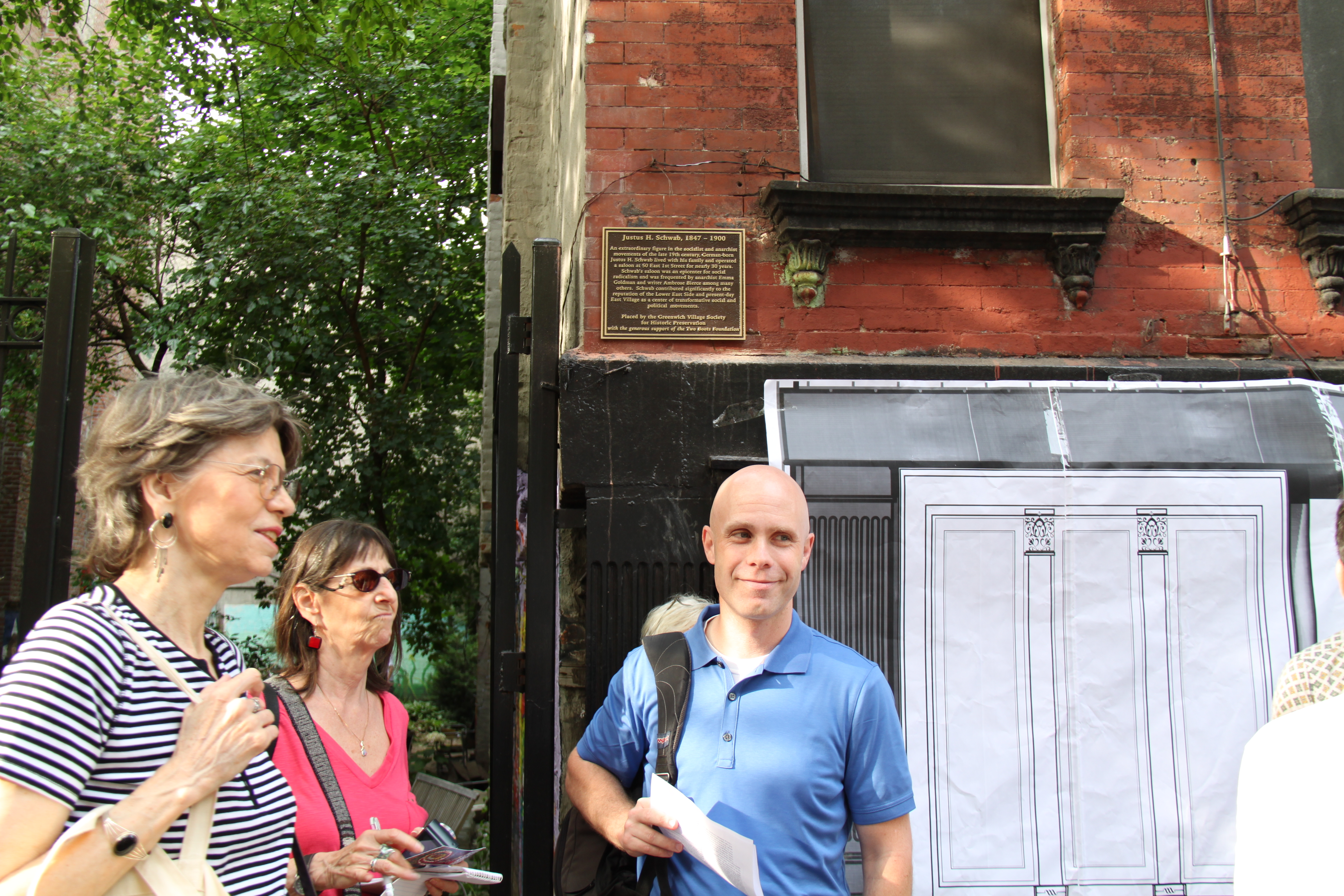
The Greenwich Village Society for Historic Preservation commemorated Schwab's saloon with a plaque in 2012.

Justus H. Schwab was born in Germany in 1847. His father was a Forty-Eighter. Schwab immigrated into the United States in 1868. He ran a saloon in New York City's Lower East Side (50 East First Street) that was popular among radicals. Emma Goldman and the periodical Sturmvogel used the saloon as their mailing address. Writers including Ambrose Bierce, Sadakichi Hartmann, and James Huneker also frequented the bar. The bar was advertised as "the gathering-place for all bold, joyful, and freedom-loving spirits".

A financial panic in 1873 set off an economic depression that lasted the rest of the decade with progressively worsening unemployment, homelessness, starvation, and general hardship. This depression gave rise to the American militant labor movement with demonstrations by the afflicted. As one such January 1874 demonstration in Tompkins Square Park devolved, Schwab walked towards the square with the Paris Commune's red flag, for which he was arrested for incitement to riot. He sang "The Marseillaise" during his arrest.

Schwab was cast out of the Socialistic Labor Party for opposing alliance with the Greenback Party in the 1880 election. He was involved in the formation of the splinter New York Social Revolutionary Club to pursue the Gotha Program in late 1880. Schwab represented the club at the 1881 Chicago Social Revolutionary Congress, where he was a key figure. Schwab spoke at the Social Revolutionary Club's reception for Johann Most's arrival in New York. Schwab became an anarchist in early 1880s, a term that emerged during this period and was synonymous with social revolutionary, anti-authoritarian socialism.

Schwab kept correspondence with Albert Parsons during the latter's imprisonment. Parsons carved a tugboat with his pocketknife and asked Schwab to raffle it with proceeds to go to Parsons' family, which it did, for $150 (equivalent to $5,249 in 2024).

Schwab died on December 17, 1900.

== Personal life ==
Schwab was tall, with thick blond hair "like a Viking" and a deep voice.

== Bibliography ==
- Avrich, Paul (1984). The Haymarket Tragedy. Princeton University Press. ISBN 978-0-691-04711-9.
- Falk, Candace, ed. (2003). "Schwab, Justus H.". Emma Goldman: A Documentary History of the American Years; Volume One: Made for America, 1890–1901. Berkeley: University of California Press. p. 555. ISBN 978-0-520-08670-8.
- Goyens, Tom (2007). Beer and Revolution: The German Anarchist Movement in New York City, 1880–1914. Urbana, Illinois: University of Illinois Press. ISBN 978-0-252-03175-5.
- Goyens, Tom, ed. (2017). Radical Gotham: Anarchism in New York City from Schwab's Saloon to Occupy Wall Street. Urbana, Illinois: University of Illinois Press. ISBN 978-0-252-08254-2.
- Gutman, Herbert G. (1965). "The Tompkins square 'Riot' in New York City on January 13, 1874: A re-examination of its causes and its aftermath". Labor History. 6 (1): 44–70. doi:10.1080/00236566508583955. ISSN 0023-656X.
- Hillquit, Morris (1906). History of Socialism in the United States (4th ed.). New York: Funk & Wagnalls.
- Messer-Kruse, Timothy (2014). The Haymarket Conspiracy: Transatlantic Anarchist Networks. The Working Class in American History. Urbana, Illinois: University of Illinois Press. ISBN 978-0-252-09414-9.
