= 1881 Chicago Social Revolutionary Congress =

Anarchist meeting

The Congress of Socialists of the United States, better known as the 1881 Chicago Social Revolutionary Congress, was a meeting of anarchists and socialists in Chicago in October 1881 to organize the new social revolutionary groups splintered from the American Socialistic Labor Party.

== Preparations ==
The Chicago congress, officially known as the Congress of Socialists of the United States, was held October 21 to 23, 1881, with 21 delegates in North Side Turner Hall. Organized by the New York Social Revolutionary Club and American delegates to the London congress three months earlier, the meeting was called to gather social revolutionaries who believed in action outside of electoral politics. All socialists with this aim were invited to apply to August Spies of Chicago's Arbeiter-Zeitung newspaper, who served as the congress's secretary. Many German emigres attended, mostly representing East Coast and Midwest cities. It was the first meeting of what became the American anarchist movement.

== Proceedings ==
Key figures in the congress included Justus Schwab, Albert Parsons, and August Spies. Resolutions addressed the British government in Ireland, the populists in Russia, and militant positions against private property, against wage slavery, for insurrectionary propaganda by the deed, and for the resolutions of the London congress.

== Bibliography ==
- Avrich, Paul (1984). The Haymarket Tragedy. Princeton University Press. ISBN 978-0-691-04711-9.
- Goyens, Tom (2007). Beer and Revolution: The German Anarchist Movement in New York City, 1880–1914. Urbana, Illinois: University of Illinois Press. ISBN 978-0-252-03175-5.
- Messer-Kruse, Timothy (2014). The Haymarket Conspiracy: Transatlantic Anarchist Networks. The Working Class in American History. Urbana, Illinois: University of Illinois Press. ISBN 978-0-252-09414-9.
