= May Day Riots =

May Day Riots may refer to:

- May Day riots of 1894 Cleveland, Ohio, U.S.
- May Day riots of 1919, Cleveland, Ohio, U.S.
- Bloody May Day, riots of May 1, 1952 in Tokyo, Japan
- Evil May Day (1517), London, England
- The 2000 disturbances in London associated with International Workers' Day (May Day)
- May Day in Kreuzberg in Berlin, Germany, from 1987 onwards
