= Haymarket affair =

1886 bombing in Chicago, Illinois, US

- Part of the Great Upheaval
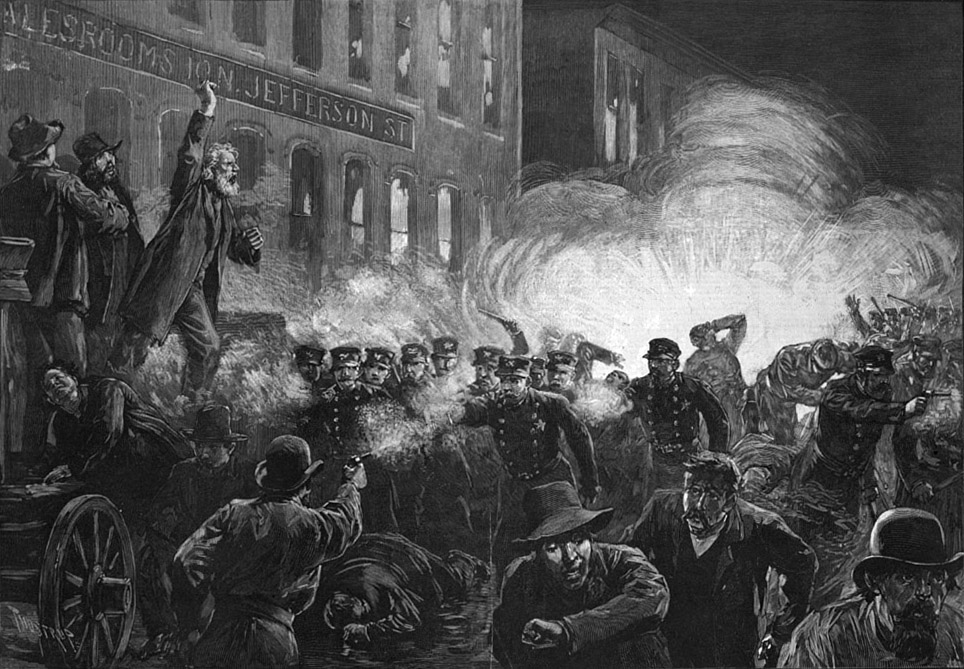
- This 1886 engraving was the most widely reproduced image of the Haymarket massacre. It shows Methodist pastor Samuel Fielden speaking, the bomb exploding, and the riot beginning simultaneously; in reality, Fielden had finished speaking before the explosion.
- Date: May 4, 1886
- Location: Chicago, Illinois, United States; 41°53′5.6″N 87°38′38.9″W
- Goals: Eight-hour work day
- Methods: Strikes; protest; demonstrations

Parties
Federation of Organized Trades and Labor Unions	Chicago Police Department

Lead figures
August Spies (executed); Albert Parsons (executed); Samuel Fielden	Carter Harrison III (mayor); John Bonfield (police inspector)

Casualties and losses
Deaths: 8 (including 4 who were executed); Injuries: 70+; Arrests: 100+	Deaths: 7
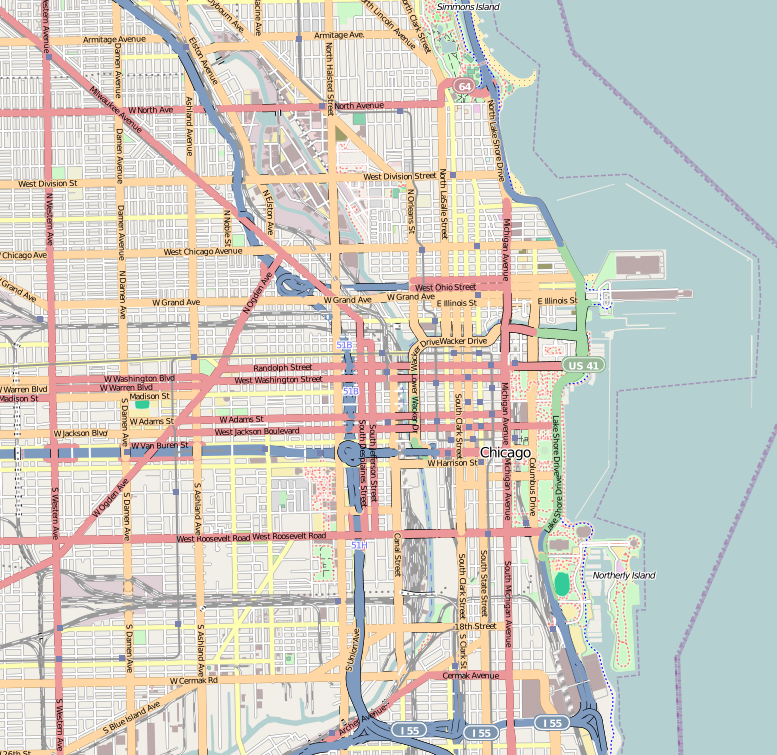
- Haymarket Square, Chicago, Illinois

The Haymarket affair was a bombing that took place at a labor demonstration on May 4, 1886, at Haymarket Square in Chicago. The rally began peacefully in support of workers striking for an eight-hour work day; it was held the day after a May 3 rally at a McCormick Harvesting Machine Company plant on the West Side of Chicago, during which police killed two strikers by opening fire at the crowd as it surged to the gate to confront strikebreakers. Many others were injured. At the Haymarket Square rally on May 4, an unknown person threw a dynamite bomb at the police as they acted to disperse the meeting, and the bomb blast and ensuing retaliatory gunfire by the police caused the deaths of seven police officers and at least four civilians; dozens of others were wounded.

Eight anarchists were charged with the bombing. They were convicted of conspiracy in the internationally publicized legal proceedings. The evidence put forward in the court trial was that one of the defendants may have built the bomb but none of those on trial had thrown it, and only two of the eight were at the Haymarket at the time. Seven were sentenced to death and one to a term of 15 years in prison. Illinois governor Richard J. Oglesby commuted two of the sentences to terms of life in prison; another died by suicide in jail before his scheduled execution. The other four were hanged on November 11, 1887. In 1893, Illinois governor John Peter Altgeld pardoned the remaining defendants and criticized the trial.

The site of the incident was designated a Chicago Landmark in 1992, and a sculpture was dedicated there in 2004. The Haymarket Martyrs' Monument was designated a National Historic Landmark in 1997 at the defendants' burial site in Forest Park, Illinois. The Haymarket affair is generally considered significant as the origin of International Workers' Day held on May 1. It was also the climax of the period of social unrest among the working class in America known as the Great Upheaval and Great Railroad Strike of 1877.

== Events ==
Following the Civil War, particularly following the Long Depression, industrial production was rapidly expanded in the United States. Chicago was a major industrial center, and tens of thousands of German and Bohemian immigrants were employed at about $1.50 per day. American workers worked on average slightly over 60 hours during a six-day work week. The city became a center for many attempts to organize labor's demands for better working conditions. Employers responded with anti-union measures, such as firing and blacklisting union members; locking out workers; recruiting strikebreakers; employing spies, thugs, and private security forces; and exacerbating ethnic tensions in order to divide the workers. Business interests were supported by mainstream newspapers and were opposed by the labor and immigrant press.

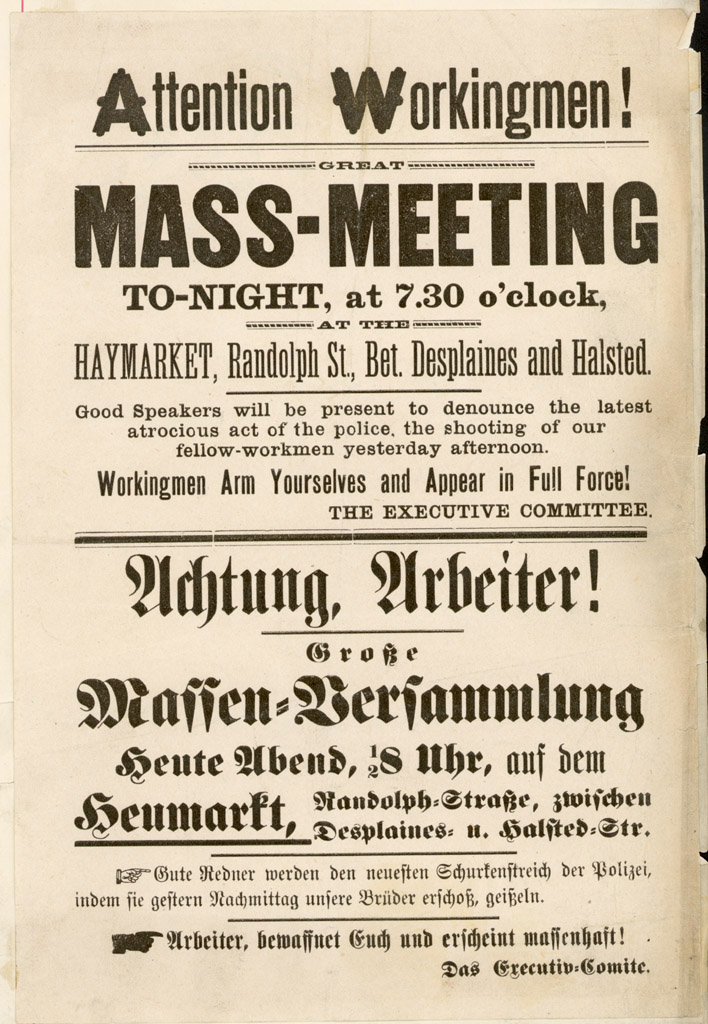
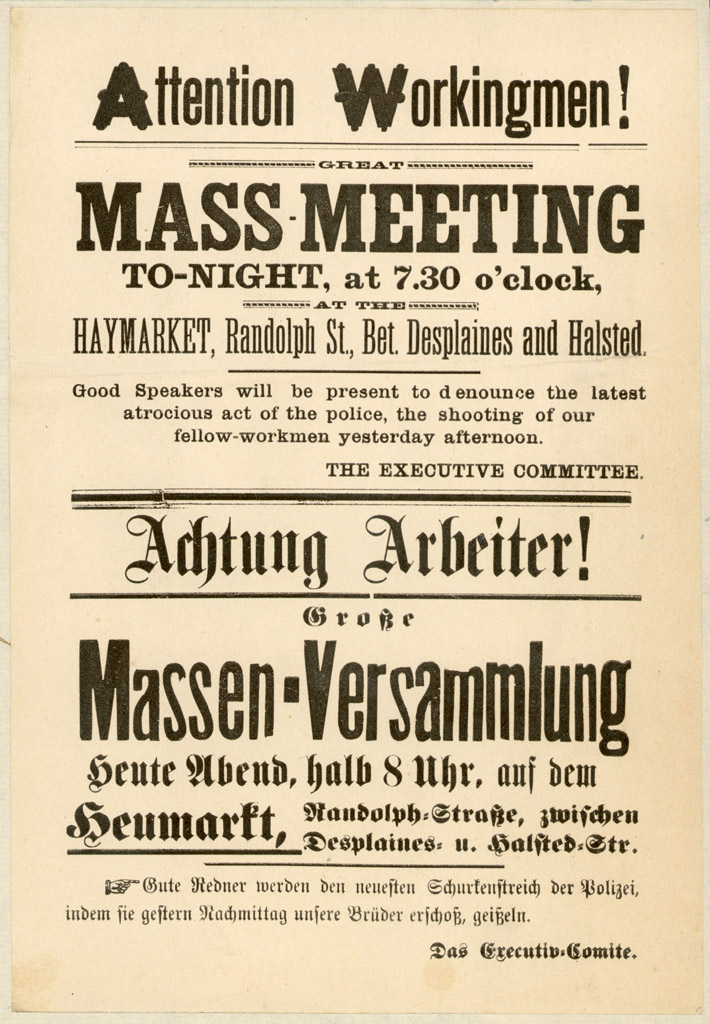
The first flier calling for a rally in the Haymarket on May 4 (left) and the revised flier for the rally (right).
The words "Workingmen Arm Yourselves and Appear in Full Force!" were removed from the revised flier.

During the economic slowdown between 1882 and 1886, socialist and anarchist organizations were active. Membership of the Knights of Labor, which rejected socialism and radicalism but supported the eight-hour work day, grew from 70,000 in 1884 to over 700,000 by 1886. In Chicago, the anarchist movement of several thousand, mostly immigrant, workers centered on the German-language newspaper Arbeiter-Zeitung ("Workers' Newspaper"), edited by August Spies. Other anarchists operated a militant revolutionary force with an armed section equipped with explosives. Its revolutionary strategy centered around the belief that successful operations against the police and the seizure of major industrial centers would lead to massive public support by workers, start a revolution, destroy capitalism, and establish a socialist economy.

=== May Day parade and strikes ===
In October 1884, a convention held by the Federation of Organized Trades and Labor Unions unanimously set May 1, 1886, as the date by which the eight-hour work day would become standard, declaring that they resolved that "eight hours shall constitute a legal day's labor, from and after May 1, 1886, and that we recommend to labor organizations that they so direct their laws". As the chosen date approached, U.S. labor unions prepared for a general strike in support of the eight-hour day.

On Saturday, May 1, thousands of workers who went on strike and attended rallies held throughout the United States sang the anthem "Eight Hour". The song's chorus reflected the ideology of the Great Upheaval, "Eight Hours for work. Eight hours for rest. Eight hours for what we will." Estimates of the number of striking workers across the U.S. range from 300,000 to half a million. In New York City the number of demonstrators was estimated at 10,000 and in Detroit at 11,000. In Milwaukee, some 10,000 workers turned out. In Chicago, the movement's center, an estimated 30,000 to 40,000 workers had gone on strike, and there were perhaps twice as many people out on the streets participating in various demonstrations and marches, as, for example, a march by 10,000 men employed in the Chicago lumber yards. Though participants in these events added up to 80,000, it is disputed whether there was a march of that number down Michigan Avenue led by anarchist Albert Parsons, founder of the International Working People's Association (IWPA), his wife and fellow organizer Lucy Parsons, and their children.

On Monday, May 3, speaking to a rally outside a McCormick Harvesting Machine Company plant on the West Side of Chicago, Spies advised the striking workers to "hold together, to stand by their union, or they would not succeed". Well-planned and coordinated, the general strike to this point had mainly remained non-violent. However, workers surged to the gates to confront strikebreakers when the end-of-the-workday bell sounded. Spies called for calm, but the police fired on the crowd. Two McCormick workers were killed; some newspaper accounts said there were six fatalities. Spies later testified, "I was very indignant. I knew from experience of the past that this butchering of people was done for the express purpose of defeating the eight-hour movement."

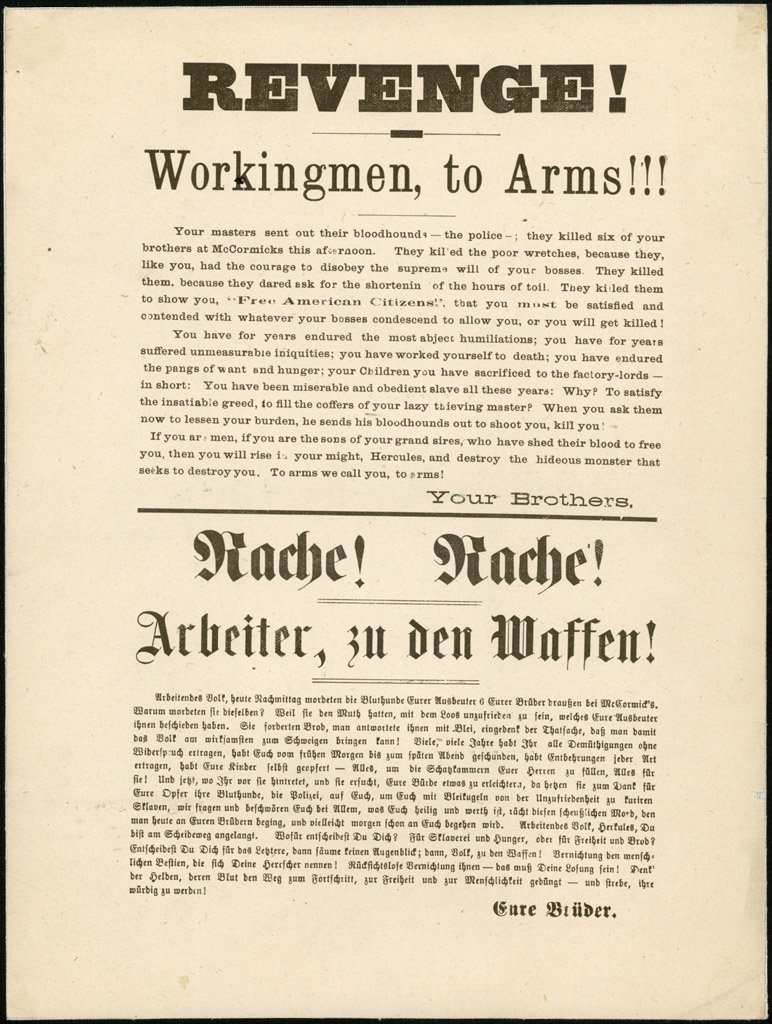
The revenge flyer

Outraged by this act of police violence, local anarchists quickly printed and distributed fliers calling for a rally the following day at Haymarket Square (also called the Haymarket), which was then a bustling commercial center near the corner of Randolph Street and Desplaines Street. Printed in German and English, the fliers stated that the police had murdered the strikers on behalf of business interests and urged workers to seek justice. The first fliers contained the words "Workingmen Arm Yourselves and Appear in Full Force!" When Spies saw the line, he said he would not speak at the rally unless the words were removed from the flier. All but a few hundred fliers were destroyed, and new fliers were printed without the offending words. More than 20,000 copies were distributed.

=== Rally at Haymarket Square ===
The rally began peacefully under a light rain on the evening of May 4. Spies, Parsons, and Reverend Samuel Fielden spoke to a crowd estimated variously at between 600 and 3,000 while standing in an open wagon adjacent to the square on Des Plaines Street. A large number of on-duty police officers watched from nearby.

Paul Avrich, a historian specializing in the history of anarchism, quotes Spies as saying:

There seems to prevail the opinion in some quarters that this meeting has been called to inaugurate a riot, hence these warlike preparations on the part of so-called 'law and order.' However, let me tell you at the beginning that this meeting has not been called for any such purpose. The object of this meeting is to explain the general situation of the eight-hour movement and to throw light upon various incidents in connection with it.

Following Spies' speech, the crowd was addressed by Parsons, the Alabama-born editor of the radical English-language weekly The Alarm. The crowd was so calm that Mayor Carter Harrison III, who had stopped by to watch, walked home early. Parsons spoke for almost an hour before standing down in favor of the last speaker of the evening, the English-born socialist, anarchist, and labor activist Methodist pastor Fielden, who delivered a brief ten-minute address. Many of the crowd had already left as the weather was deteriorating.

A New York Times article, with the dateline May 4, and headlined "Rioting and Bloodshed in the Streets of Chicago ... Twelve Policemen Dead or Dying", reported that Fielden spoke for 20 minutes, alleging that his words grew "wilder and more violent as he proceeded". Another New York Times article, headlined "Anarchy's Red Hand", dated May 6, opens with: "The villainous teachings of the Anarchists bore bloody fruit in Chicago tonight and before daylight at least a dozen stalwart men will have laid down their lives as a tribute to the doctrine of Herr Johann Most." (Most was a German-American anarchist theorist and leader, who was not in Chicago.) The article referred to the strikers as a "mob" and used quotation marks around the term "workingmen".

==== Bombing and gunfire ====
At about 10:30 pm, just as Fielden was finishing his speech, police arrived en masse, marching in formation towards the speakers' wagon, and ordered the rally to disperse. Fielden insisted that the meeting was peaceful. Police Inspector John Bonfield proclaimed:

I command you [addressing the speaker] in the name of the law to desist and you [addressing the crowd] to disperse.

A homemade fragmentation bomb was thrown into the path of the advancing police, where it exploded, killing policeman Mathias J. Degan and severely wounding many of the other policemen.

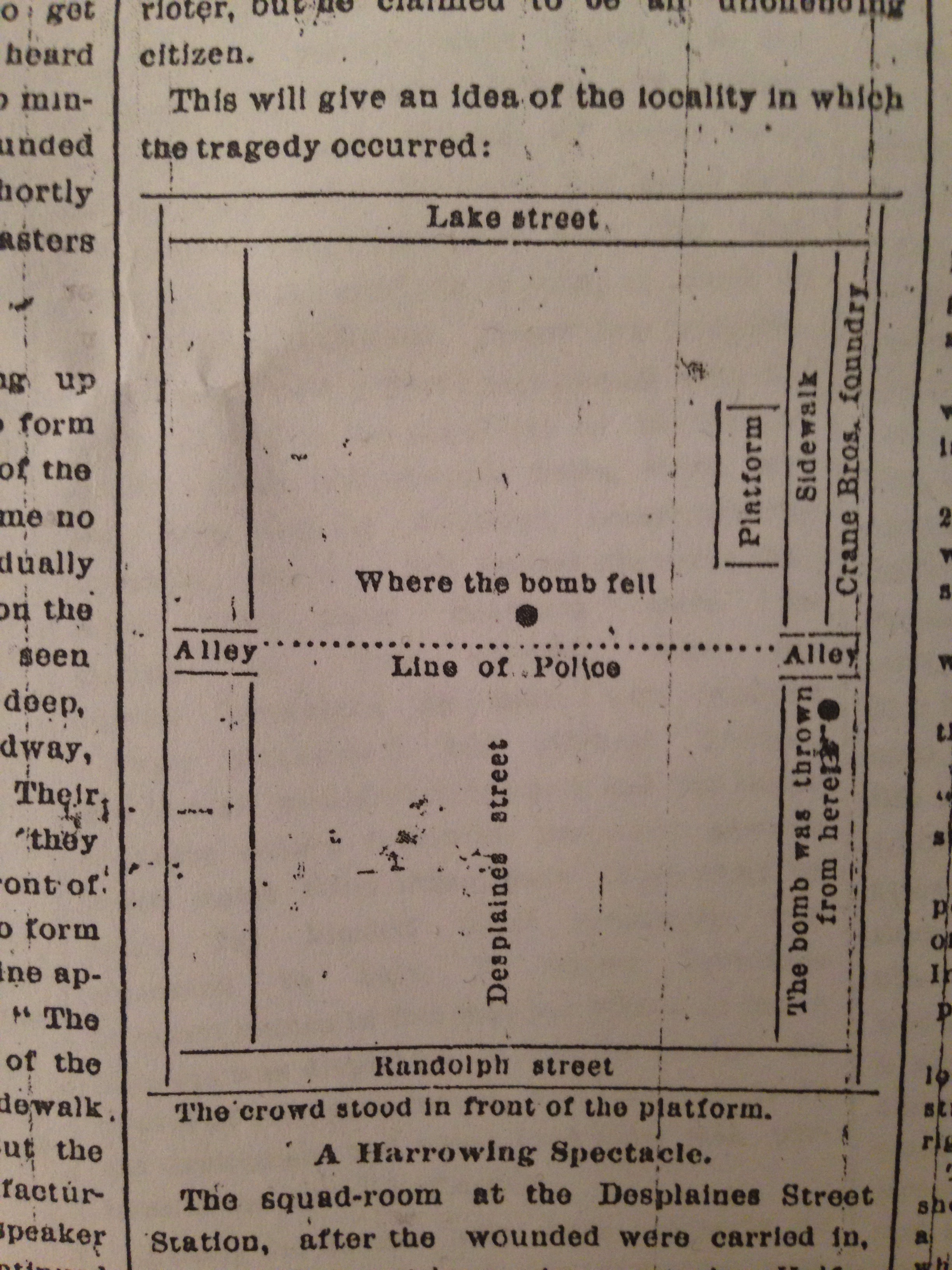
A map of the bombing published by the Chicago Tribune on May 5, 1886

Witnesses maintained that immediately after the bomb blast, there was an exchange of gunshots between police and demonstrators. According to historian Randall David Law, it is unclear who fired the first shot, while Avrich maintains that "nearly all sources agree that it was the police who opened fire", reloaded and then fired again, killing at least four and wounding as many as 70 people. In less than five minutes, the square was empty except for the casualties. According to the May 4 New York Times, demonstrators began firing at the police, who then returned fire. In his report on the incident, Inspector Bonfield wrote that he "gave the order to cease firing, fearing that some of our men, in the darkness, might fire into each other". An anonymous police official told the Chicago Tribune, "A very large number of the police were wounded by each other's revolvers. ... It was every man for himself, and while some got two or three squares away, the rest emptied their revolvers, mainly into each other."

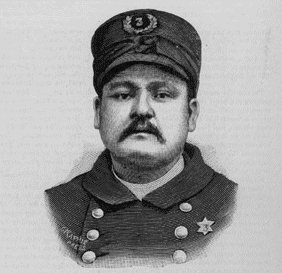
Engraving of police officer Mathias J. Degan, who was killed by the bomb blast

In all, seven policemen and at least four workers were killed. Avrich said that most of the police deaths were from police gunfire. Historian Timothy Messer-Kruse argues that although it is impossible to rule out lethal friendly fire, several policemen were probably shot by armed protesters. Another policeman died two years after the incident from complications related to injuries received that day. Police Captain Michael Schaack later wrote that the number of wounded workers was "largely in excess of that on the side of the police". The Chicago Herald describes a scene of "wild carnage" and estimates at least 50 dead or wounded civilians lay in the streets. It is unclear how many civilians were wounded since many were afraid to seek medical attention, fearing arrest. They found aid where they could.

=== Aftermath and red scare ===
A harsh anti-union clampdown followed the Haymarket incident, and the Great Upheaval subsided. Employers regained control of their workers, and traditional workdays were restored to ten or more hours per day. There was a massive outpouring of community and business support for the police, and many thousands of dollars were donated to funds for their medical care and to assist their efforts. The entire labor and immigrant community, particularly Germans and Bohemians, came under suspicion. The tensions were not one-sided: Officer Casey, one of those arrested in the aftermath, had required rescue after a crowd of Bohemian workers attempted to hang him from a lamp post, believing he had killed one of their countrymen during the assault on the McCormick factory the previous day. Police raids were carried out on homes and offices of suspected anarchists. Dozens of suspects, many only remotely related to the Haymarket Affair, were arrested. Ignoring legal requirements such as for search warrants, Chicago police squads subjected the labor activists of Chicago to an eight-week shakedown, ransacking their meeting halls and places of business. The emphasis was on the speakers at the Haymarket rally and the newspaper Arbeiter-Zeitung. A small group of anarchists was declared to have been engaged in making bombs on the same day as the incident, including round ones like the one used in Haymarket Square.

Newspaper reports declared that anarchist agitators were to blame for the riot, a view adopted by an alarmed public. As time passed, press reports and illustrations of the incident became more elaborate. Coverage was national, then international. Among property owners, the press, and other elements of society, a consensus developed that suppression of anarchist agitation was necessary while for their part, union organizations such as The Knights of Labor and craft unions were quick to disassociate themselves from the anarchist movement and to repudiate violent tactics as self-defeating. Many workers, on the other hand, believed that industry-hired men of the Pinkerton agency were responsible because of the agency's tactic of secretly infiltrating labor groups and its sometimes violent methods of strike breaking.

== Legal proceedings ==
=== Investigation ===
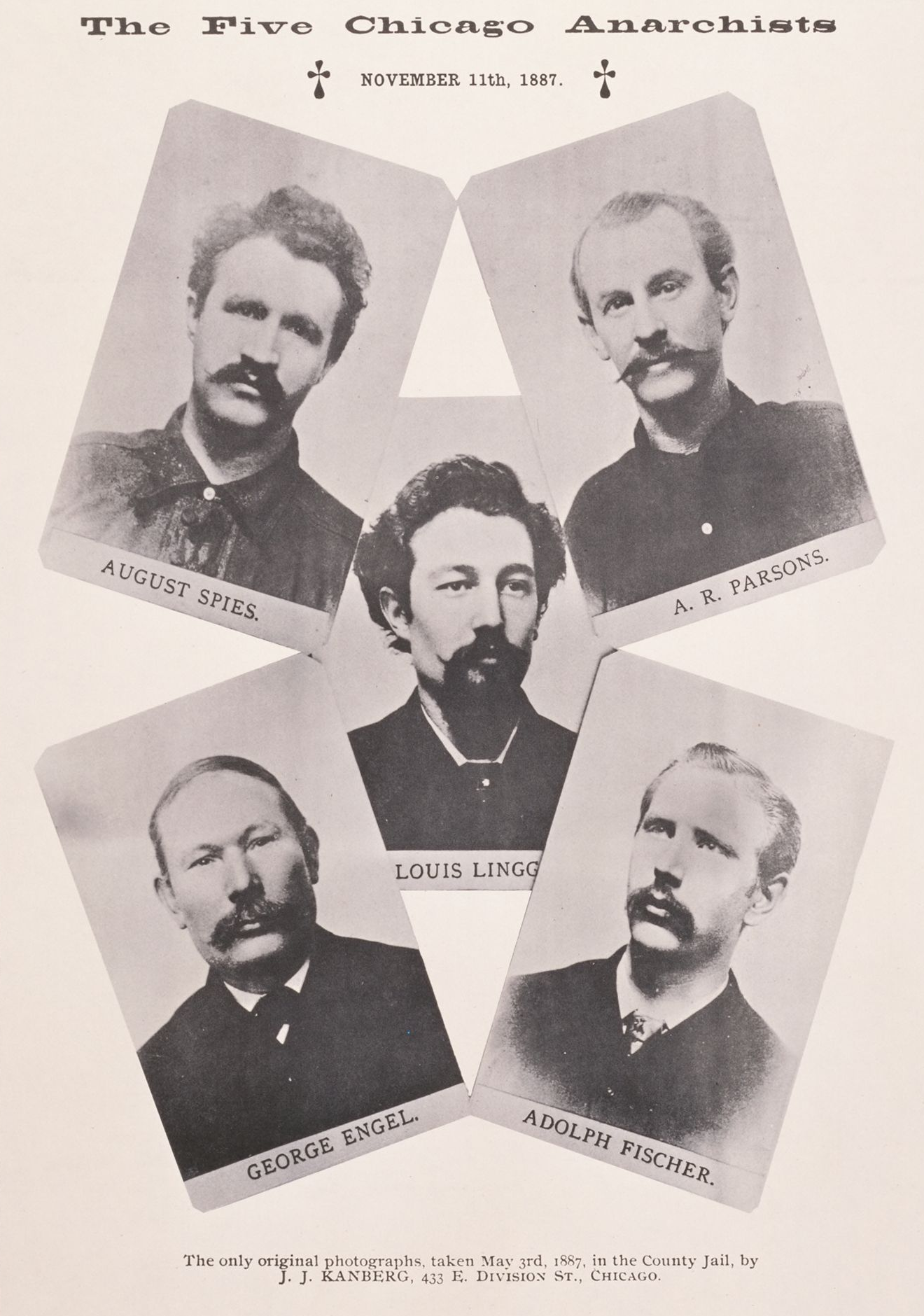
Mug shots of the four anarchists executed–and Louis Lingg, who committed suicide–taken by J. J. Kanberg at the Cook County Jail, May 3, 1887

The police assumed that an anarchist had thrown the bomb as part of a planned conspiracy; their problem was how to prove it. On the morning of May 5, they raided the offices of the Arbeiter-Zeitung, arresting Spies and his brother, who was not charged. Also arrested were editorial assistant Michael Schwab and Adolph Fischer, a typesetter. At a coroner's inquest on May 14 into the deaths of Officers Shehan and Flavin, Detective Bonfield testified that Fischer had a fulminating cap used for dynamite on his person when arrested, and that Anton Hershberger, a printer at the Arbeiter-Zeitung who had set up the "revenge" circular, had a bullet hole in his coat at the time of his arrest. The inquest verdict on Officer Flavin found that his death was caused directly by the bomb rather than pistol shots, and added Fischer and Hershberger to the list of those held as accessories to murder. A search of the premises resulted in the discovery of the "Revenge Poster" and other evidence considered incriminating by the prosecution.

On May 7, police searched the premises of Louis Lingg where they found bombs and bomb-making materials. Lingg himself had been in hiding since the bombing; on May 14 he was arrested at No. 80 Ambrose Street on information furnished by an Arbeiter-Zeitung employee. At the police station he was subjected to a three-hour interrogation and made a statement whose contents police refused to disclose, after which detectives were dispatched to Claybourne Avenue to arrest others implicated by his confession. Lingg's landlord William Seliger was also arrested but cooperated with police, identified Lingg as a bomb-maker, and was not charged. An associate of Spies, Balthazar Rau, suspected as the bomber, was traced to Omaha and brought back to Chicago. After interrogation, Rau offered to cooperate with police. He alleged that the defendants had experimented with dynamite bombs and accused them of having published what he said was a code word, "Ruhe" ("peace"), in the Arbeiter-Zeitung as a call to arms at Haymarket Square.

=== Defendants ===
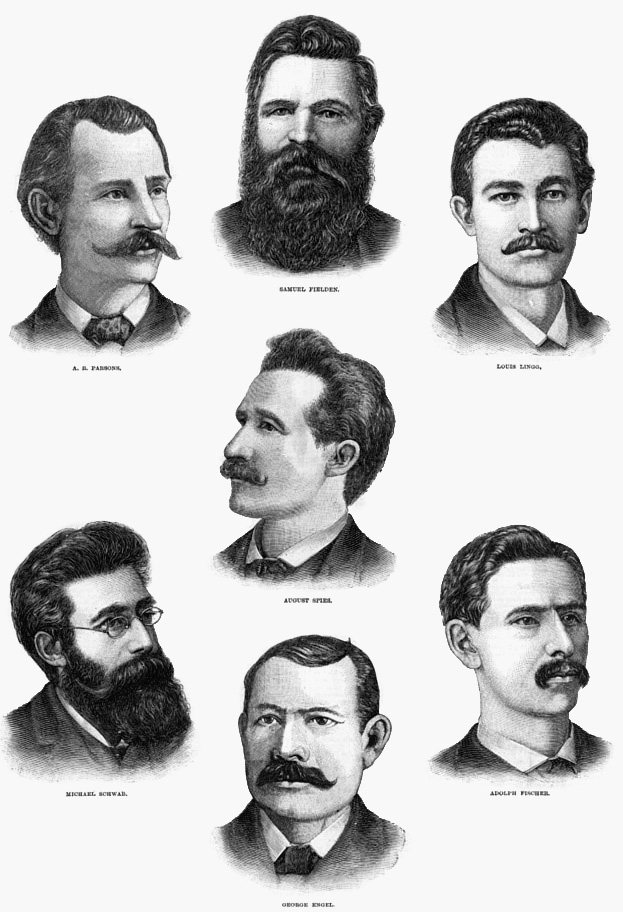
Engraving of the seven anarchists sentenced to die for Degan's murder. An eighth defendant, Oscar Neebe, not shown here, was sentenced to 15 years in prison.

Rudolf Schnaubelt, the police's lead suspect as the bomb thrower, was arrested twice early on and released. By May 14, when it became apparent he had played a significant role in the event, he had fled the country. William Seliger, who had turned state's evidence and testified for the prosecution, was freed by the state. On June 4, 1886, eight other suspects were indicted by the grand jury and stood trial for being accessories to the murder of Degan. Of these, only two had been present when the bomb exploded. Spies and Fielden had spoken at the peaceful rally and were stepping down from the speaker's wagon in compliance with police orders to disperse just before the bomb went off. Fischer and Parsons had been present at the beginning of the rally but had left and were at Zepf's Hall, an anarchist rendezvous, at the time of the explosion. Parsons, who believed that the evidence against them all was weak, subsequently voluntarily turned himself in, in solidarity with the accused. Schwab (who was the brother-in-law of Schnaubelt) had been speaking at another rally at the time of the bombing; he was also later pardoned. Not directly tied to the Haymarket rally, but arrested for their militant radicalism were George Engel, who had been at home playing cards on that day, and Lingg. Another defendant who had not been present that day was Oscar Neebe, an American-born citizen of German descent who was associated with the Arbeiter-Zeitung and had attempted to revive it in the aftermath of the Haymarket riot.

Of the eight defendants, Spies, Fischer, Engel, Lingg and Schwab were immigrants born in Germany; Neebe, was a U.S.-born citizen of German descent. Parsons and Fielden, born in the U.S. and England, respectively, were of British heritage.

=== Trial ===
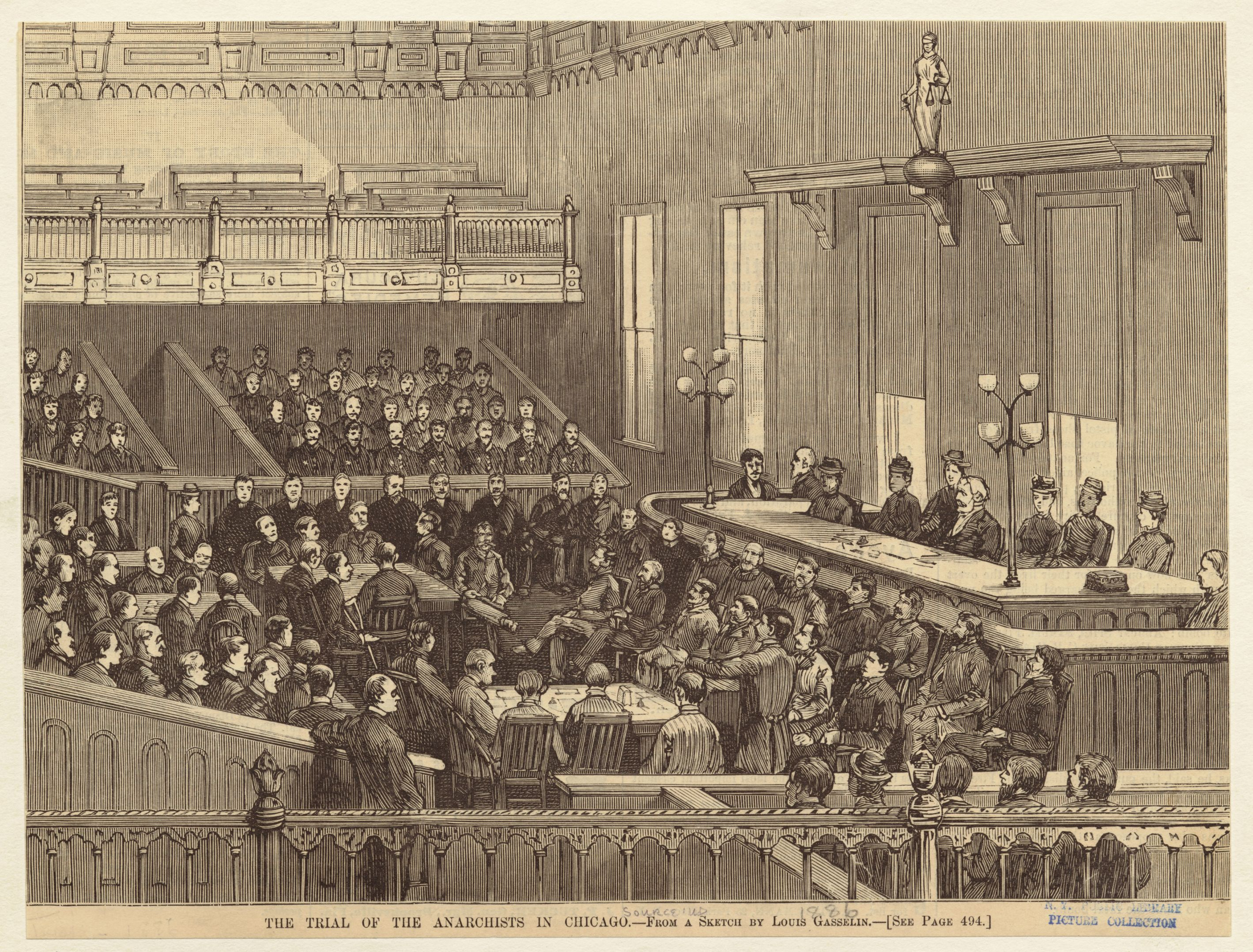
An artist's sketch of the trial, Illinois vs. August Spies et al. (1886)

The trial, Illinois vs. August Spies et al., began on June 21, 1886, and went on until August 11. The trial was conducted in an atmosphere of extreme prejudice by both public and media toward the defendants. It was presided by Judge Joseph Gary, who displayed open hostility to the defendants, consistently ruled for the prosecution, and failed to maintain decorum. A motion to try the defendants separately was denied. The defense counsel included Sigmund Zeisler and William Perkins Black. Selection of a jury was extraordinarily difficult, lasting three weeks, and nearly 1,000 people had been called. All union members and anyone who expressed sympathy toward socialism were dismissed. In the end a jury of 12 was seated, most of whom confessed prejudice against the defendants. Despite their professions of prejudice Judge Gary seated those who declared that despite their prejudices they would acquit if the evidence supported it, refusing to dismiss for prejudice. Eventually the peremptory challenges of the defense were exhausted. Frustrated by the hundreds of jurors who were being dismissed, a bailiff was appointed who selected jurors rather than calling them at random. The bailiff proved prejudiced and selected jurors who seemed likely to convict based on their social position and attitudes toward the defendants. The prosecution, led by Julius Grinnell, argued that since the defendants had not actively discouraged the person who had thrown the bomb, they were therefore equally responsible as conspirators. The jury heard the testimony of 118 people, including 54 members of the Chicago Police Department and the defendants Fielden, Schwab, Spies and Parsons. Albert Parsons's brother claimed there was evidence linking the Pinkertons to the bomb. This reflected a widespread belief among the strikers.

Exhibit 129a from the Haymarket trial: Chemists testified that the bombs found in Lingg's apartment, including this one, resembled the chemical signature of shrapnel from the Haymarket bomb.

Police investigators under Captain Michael Schaack had a lead fragment removed from a policeman's wounds chemically analyzed. They reported that the lead used in the casing matched the casings of bombs found in Lingg's home. A metal nut and fragments of the casing taken from the wound also roughly matched bombs made by Lingg. Schaack concluded, on the basis of interviews, that the anarchists had been experimenting for years with dynamite and other explosives, refining the design of their bombs before coming up with the effective one used at the Haymarket.

At the last minute, when it was discovered that instructions for manslaughter had not been included in the submitted instructions, the jury was called back, and the instructions were given.

=== Verdict and contemporary reactions ===
The verdict as reported by Harpers Weekly

The jury returned guilty verdicts for all eight defendants. Before being sentenced, Neebe told the court that Schaack's officers were among the city's worst gangs, ransacking houses and stealing money and watches. Schaack laughed, and Neebe retorted, "You need not laugh about it, Captain Schaack. You are one of them. You are an anarchist, as you understand it. You are all anarchists, in this sense of the word, I must say." Judge Gary sentenced seven of the defendants to death by hanging and Neebe to 15 years in prison. The sentencing provoked outrage from labor and workers' movements and their supporters, resulting in protests around the world, and elevating the defendants to the status of martyrs, especially abroad. Portrayals of the anarchists as bloodthirsty foreign fanatics in the press along with the 1889 publication of Captain Schaack's sensational account, Anarchy and Anarchism, on the other hand, inspired widespread public fear and revulsion against the strikers and general anti-immigrant feeling, polarizing public opinion.

In an article datelined May 4, entitled "Anarchy's Red Hand", The New York Times describes the incident as the "bloody fruit" of "the villainous teachings of the Anarchists". The Chicago Times described the defendants as "arch counselors of riot, pillage, incendiarism and murder"; other reporters described them as "bloody brutes", "red ruffians", "dynamarchists", "bloody monsters", "cowards", "cutthroats", "thieves", "assassins", and "fiends". Journalist George Frederic Parsons wrote a piece for The Atlantic Monthly in which he identifies the fears of middle-class Americans concerning labor radicalism and asserts that the workers had only themselves to blame for their troubles. Edward Aveling remarked, "If these men are ultimately hanged, it will be the Chicago Tribune that has done it." Schaack, who had led the investigation, was dismissed from the police force for allegedly having fabricated evidence in the case but was reinstated in 1892.

=== Appeals ===
The case was appealed in 1887 to the Supreme Court of Illinois, then to the United States Supreme Court where the defendants were represented by John Randolph Tucker, Roger Atkinson Pryor, General Benjamin F. Butler and William P. Black. The petition for certiorari was denied.

=== Commutations and suicide ===
After the appeals had been exhausted, it was left to Illinois governor Richard James Oglesby to decide whether to commute the sentences of the convicted. Hundreds of thousands of people across the country petitioned him to do so, though the press at the time largely called for executions.

Oglesby was troubled by the case. Parson's attorney had noted in the trial that hanging these men would be the equivalent of hanging abolitionists who had sympathized with John Brown. Oglesby, a former Radical Republican, acknowledged that under these laws "all of us abolitionists would have been hanged a long time ago". In the end, Oglesby decided he would only pardon those who asked for clemency. Four of the seven outright refused this on the grounds that they had committed no crime, and so only the two who did request mercy, Fielden and Schwab, had their sentences commuted to life in prison on November 10, 1887.

On the eve of his scheduled execution, Lingg died by suicide in his cell with a smuggled blasting cap which he reportedly held in his mouth like a cigar (the blast blew off half his face, and he survived in agony for six hours).

=== Executions ===
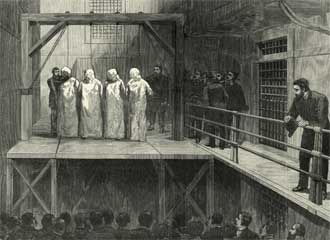
Execution of defendants—Engel, Fischer, Parsons, and Spies

The next day (November 11, 1887) four defendants—Engel, Fischer, Parsons, and Spies—were taken to the gallows in white robes and hoods. They sang the Marseillaise, the anthem of the international revolutionary movement. Family members including Lucy Parsons, who attempted to see them for the last time, were arrested and searched for bombs (none were found). According to witnesses, in the moments before the men were hanged, Spies shouted, "The time will come when our silence will be more powerful than the voices you strangle today." In their last words, Engel and Fischer called out, "Hurrah for anarchism!" Parsons then requested to speak, but he was cut off when the signal was given to spring the trap door. Witnesses reported that the condemned men did not die immediately when they dropped but strangled to death slowly, a sight which left the spectators visibly shaken.

=== Identity of the bomber ===
Notwithstanding the convictions for conspiracy, no actual bomber was ever brought to trial, "and no lawyerly explanation could ever make a conspiracy trial without the main perpetrator seem completely legitimate." Historians such as James Joll and Timothy Messer-Kruse say the evidence points to Schnaubelt as the likely perpetrator.

== Pardons and historical characterization ==
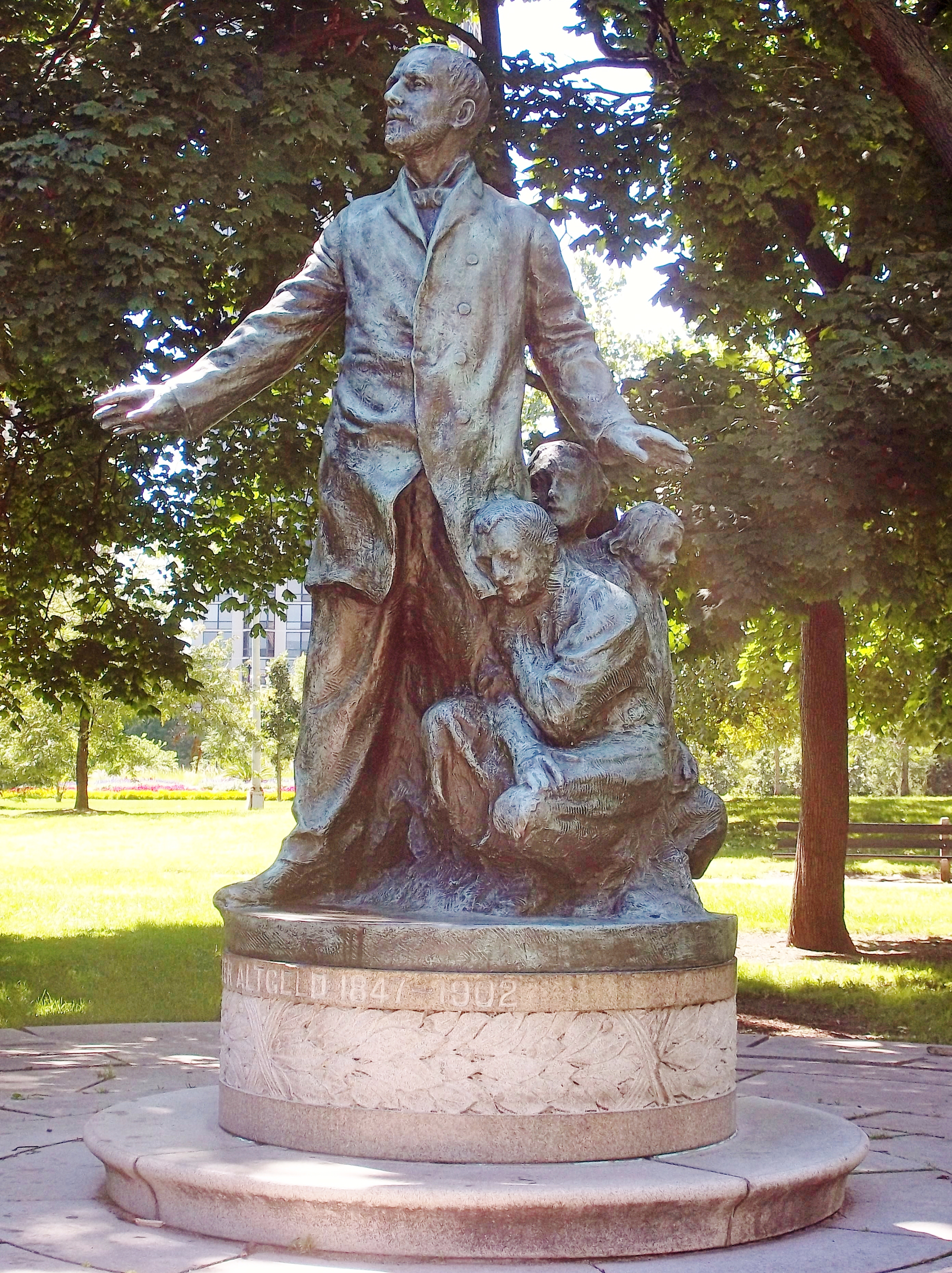
Altgeld Monument (by Borglum) erected by the Illinois Legislature in Lincoln Park, Chicago (1915)

Among supporters of the labor movement, the trial was widely believed to have been unfair and even a serious miscarriage of justice. Prominent people who condemned the trial included novelist William Dean Howells, attorney Clarence Darrow, playwrights Oscar Wilde and George Bernard Shaw, and poet William Morris. On June 26, 1893, Illinois governor John Peter Altgeld, a German immigrant, signed pardons for Fielden, Neebe, and Schwab, calling them victims of "hysteria, packed juries, and a biased judge" and noting that the state "has never discovered who it was that threw the bomb which killed the policeman, and the evidence does not show any connection whatsoever between the defendants and the man who threw it". Altgeld also faulted the city of Chicago for failing to hold Pinkerton guards responsible for repeated use of lethal violence against striking workers. Altgeld's actions concerning labor were used to defeat his re-election.

Soon after the trial, anarchist Dyer Lum wrote a history of the trial critical of the prosecution. In 1888, George McLean, and in 1889 Schack, wrote accounts from the opposite perspective. Awaiting sentencing, each of the defendants wrote autobiographies (edited and published by Philip Foner in 1969), and Lucy Parsons published a biography of her condemned husband Albert Parsons. Fifty years after the event, Henry David wrote a history which preceded another scholarly treatment by Paul Avrich in 1984, and a "social history" of the era by Bruce C. Nelson in 1988. In 2006, labor historian James Green wrote a popular history.

Christopher Thale writes in the Encyclopedia of Chicago that lacking credible evidence regarding the bombing, "the prosecution focused on the writings and speeches of the defendants." He further notes that the conspiracy charge was legally unprecedented, the judge was "partisan", and all the jurors admitted prejudice against the defendants. Historian Carl Smith writes: "The visceral feelings of fear and anger surrounding the trial ruled out anything but the pretense of justice right from the outset." Smith notes that scholars have long considered the trial a "notorious miscarriage of law".

Not all observers have been so harsh towards the prosecution and trial. In a review somewhat more critical of the defendants, historian Jon Teaford concludes "the tragedy of Haymarket is the American justice system did not protect the damn fools who most needed that protection ... It is the damn fools who talk too much and too wildly who are most in need of protection from the state." Historian Timothy Messer-Kruse revisited the digitized trial transcript and argues, against prevailing consensus of historians and legal experts, that the proceedings were fair for their time and there was compelling evidence linking the accused to the bombing and also linking the accused to wider anarchist networks that promoted political violence. Messer-Kruse claims critics of the trial tend to ignore the court transcripts and notes how prevailing court procedure of the era relied heavily on witness testimony, and there was little or no emphasis on physical evidence.

== Effects on the labor movement and May Day ==
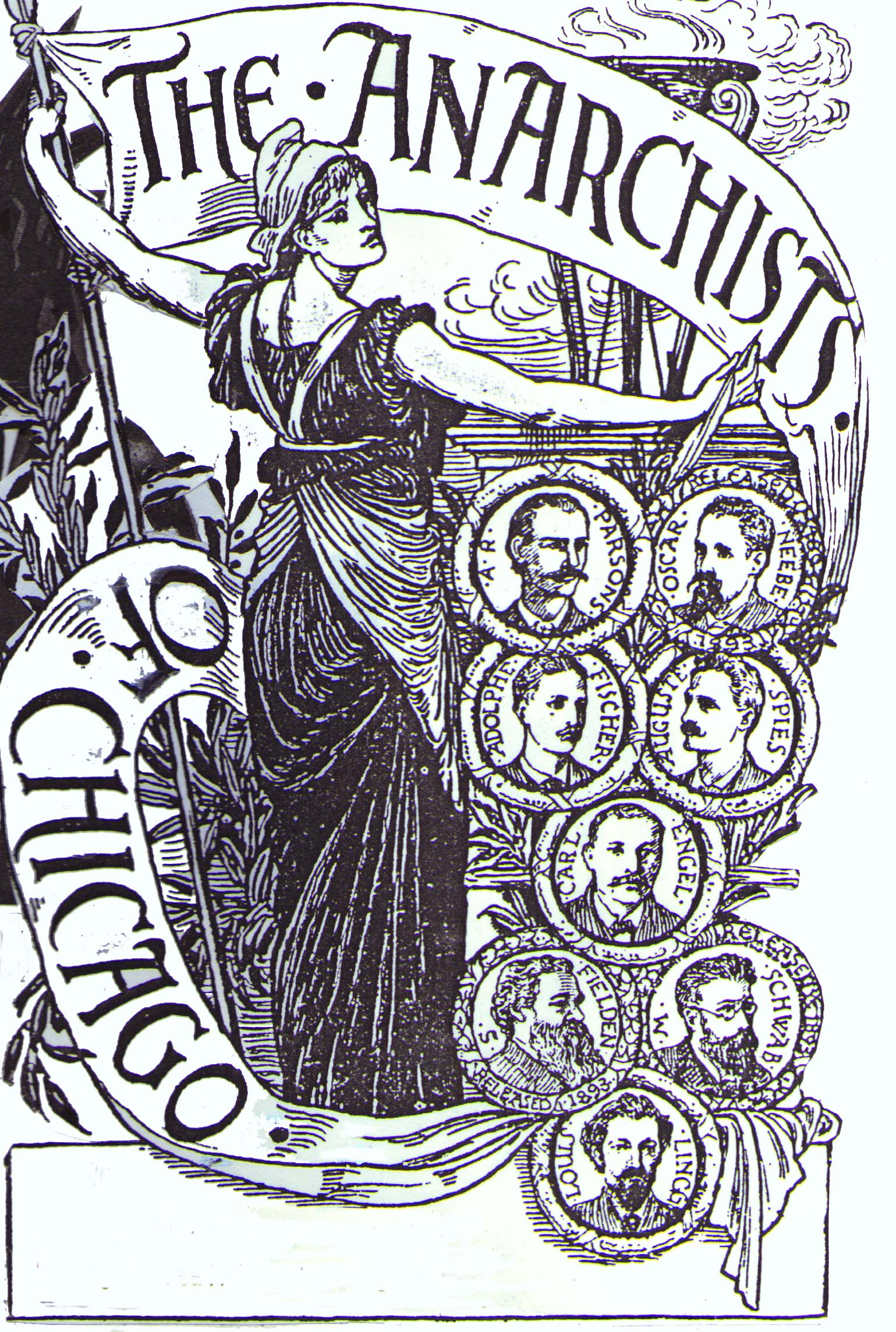
This sympathetic engraving by English Arts and Crafts illustrator Walter Crane of "The Anarchists of Chicago" was widely circulated among anarchists, socialists, and labor activists.

Historian Nathan Fine points out that trade-union activities continued to show signs of growth and vitality, culminating later in 1886 with the establishment of the Labor Party of Chicago.

Fine observes:

The fact is that despite police repression, newspaper incitement to hysteria, and organization of the possessing classes, which followed the throwing of the bomb on May 4, the Chicago wage earners only united their forces and stiffened their resistance. The conservative and radical central bodies – there were two each of the trade unions and two also of the Knights of Labor – the socialists and the anarchists, the single taxers and the reformers, the native born ... and the foreign born Germans, Bohemians, and Scandinavians, all got together for the first time on the political field in the summer following the Haymarket Affair. ... The Knights of Labor doubled its membership, reaching 40,000 in the fall of 1886. On Labor Day the number of Chicago workers in parade led the country.

On the first anniversary of the event, May 4, 1887, the New-York Tribune published an interview with Senator Leland Stanford, in which he addressed the consensus that "the conflict between capital and labor is intensifying" and articulated the vision advocated by the Knights of Labor for an industrial system of worker-owned co-operatives, another among the strategies pursued to advance the conditions of laborers. The interview was republished as a pamphlet to include the bill Stanford introduced in the Senate to foster co-operatives.

Popular pressure continued for the establishment of the 8-hour day. At the convention of the American Federation of Labor (AFL) in 1888, the union decided to campaign for the shorter workday again. May 1, 1890, was agreed upon as the date on which workers would strike for an eight-hour workday.

In 1889, AFL president Samuel Gompers wrote to the first congress of the Second International, which was meeting in Paris. He informed the world's socialists of the AFL's plans and proposed an international fight for a universal eight-hour workday. In response to Gompers's letter, the Second International adopted a resolution calling for "a great international demonstration" on a single date so workers everywhere could demand the eight-hour workday. In light of the Americans' plan, the International adopted May 1, 1890, as the date for this demonstration.

A secondary purpose behind the adoption of the resolution by the Second International was to honor the memory of the Haymarket martyrs and other workers who had been killed in association with the strikes on May 1, 1886. Historian Philip Foner writes, "There is little doubt that everyone associated with the resolution passed by the Paris Congress knew of the May 1 demonstrations and strikes for the eight-hour day in 1886 in the United States ... and the events associated with the Haymarket tragedy."

The first May Day was a spectacular success. The front page of the New York World on May 2, 1890, was devoted to coverage of the event. Two of its headlines were "Parade of Jubilant Workingmen in All the Trade Centers of the Civilized World" and "Everywhere the Workmen Join in Demands for a Normal Day". The Times of London listed two dozen European cities in which demonstrations had taken place, noting there had also been rallies in Cuba, Peru and Chile. Commemoration of May Day became an annual event the following year.

The association of May Day with the Haymarket martyrs has remained strong in Mexico. Mary Harris "Mother" Jones was in Mexico on May 1, 1921, and wrote of the "day of 'fiestas'" that marked "the killing of the workers in Chicago for demanding the eight-hour day". In 1929, The New York Times referred to the May Day parade in Mexico City as "the annual demonstration glorifying the memory of those who were killed in Chicago in 1887". The New York Times described the 1936 demonstration as a commemoration of "the death of the martyrs in Chicago". In 1939, Oscar Neebe's grandson attended the May Day parade in Mexico City and was shown, as his host told him, "how the world shows respect to your grandfather". In his book about the Haymarket Affair, historian James Green wrote, "No other event in American history has exerted such a hold on the imaginations of people in other lands, especially on the minds of working people in Europe and the Latin world, where the 'martyrs of Chicago' were annually recalled in the iconography of May Day."

The influence of the Haymarket Affair was not limited to the celebration of May Day. Emma Goldman, the activist and political theorist, was attracted to anarchism after reading about the incident and the executions, which she later described as "the events that had inspired my spiritual birth and growth". She considered the Haymarket martyrs to be "the most decisive influence in my existence", and was powerfully moved by attending the famous socialist speaker Johanna Greie's speech on the subject, expressing that "at the end of Greie's speech I knew what I had surmised all along: the Chicago men were innocent." Her associate Alexander Berkman also described the Haymarket anarchists as "a potent and vital inspiration". Others whose commitment to anarchism, or revolutionary socialism, crystallized as a result of the Haymarket Affair included Voltairine de Cleyre and "Big Bill" Haywood, a founding member of the Industrial Workers of the World. Goldman wrote to historian Max Nettlau that the Haymarket Affair had awakened the social consciousness of "hundreds, perhaps thousands, of people".

== Suspected bombers ==
While admitting that none of the defendants were involved in the bombing, the prosecution made the argument that Lingg had built the bomb, and prosecution witnesses Harry Gilmer and Malvern Thompson tried to imply that the bomb-thrower was helped by Spies, Fischer, and Schwab. The defendants claimed they had no knowledge of the bomber at all.

Several activists, including Robert Reitzel, later hinted they knew who the bomber was. Writers and other commentators have speculated about many possible suspects:

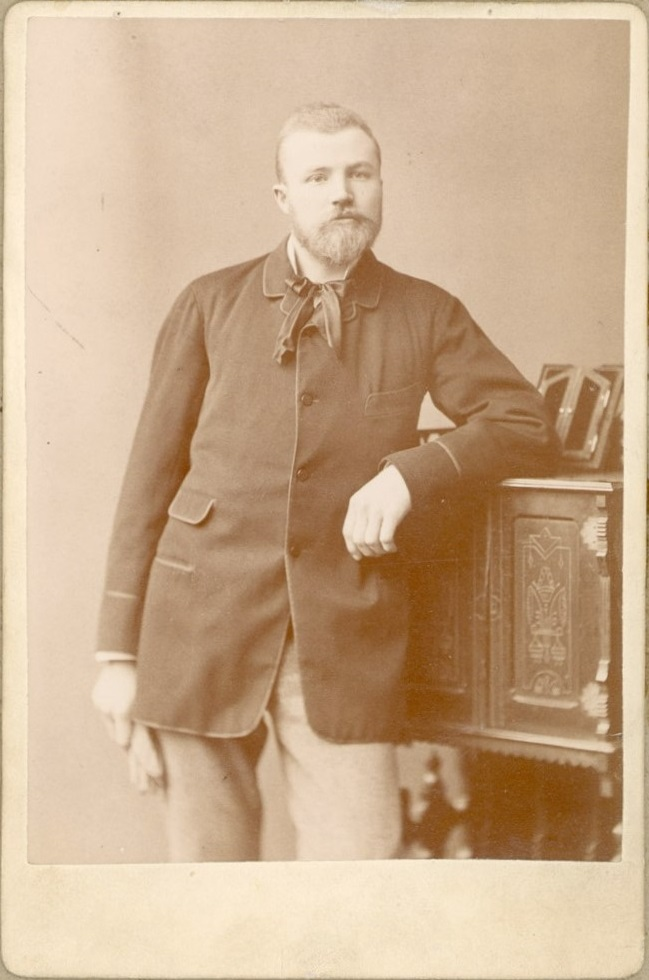
Rudolph Schnaubelt was identified as the bomb thrower by prosecution witness Gilmer from this photograph during the trial.

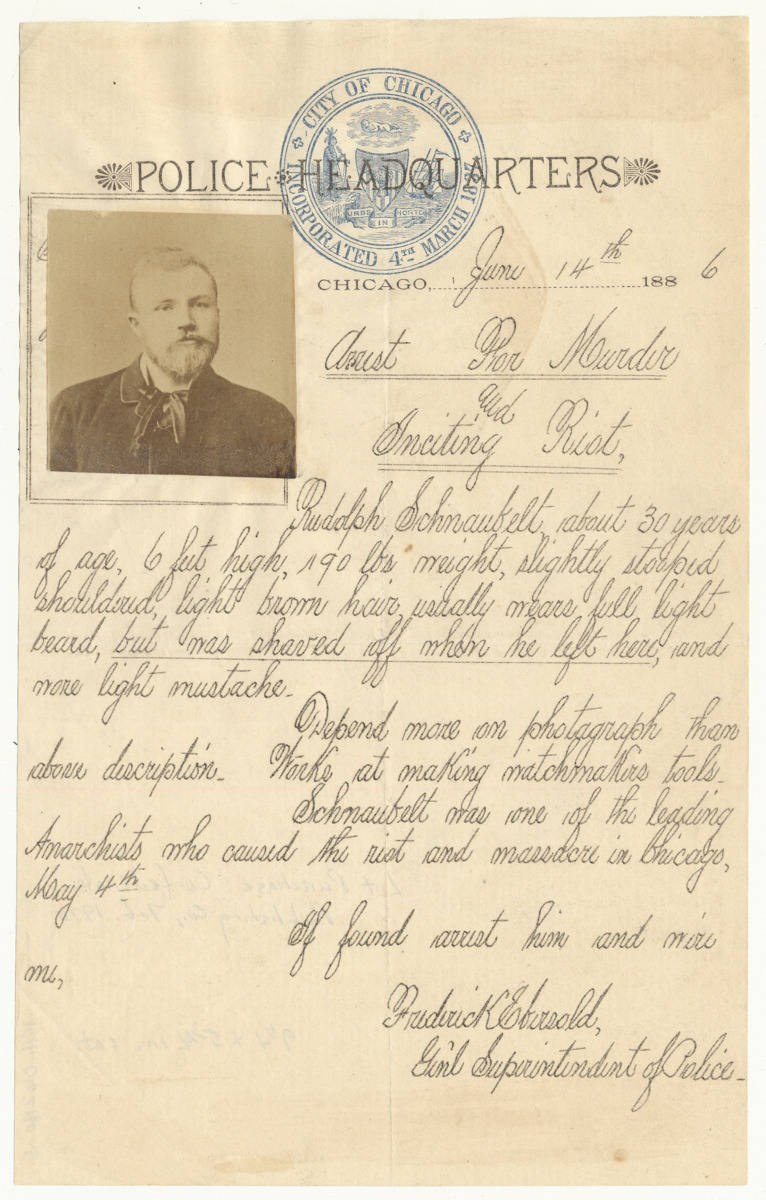
Arrest warrant with the same photograph for Schnaubelt, issued by Ebersold, June 14, 1886.

- Rudolph Schnaubelt (1863–1901) was an activist and the brother-in law of Michael Schwab. He was at the Haymarket when the bomb exploded. General Superintendent of the Chicago Police Department Frederick Ebersold issued a handwritten bulletin for his arrest for murder and inciting a riot on June 14. Schnaubelt was indicted with the other defendants but fled the city and later the country before he could be brought to trial. He was the detectives' lead suspect, and state witness Gilmer testified he saw Schnaubelt throw the bomb, identifying him from a photograph in court. Schnaubelt later sent two letters from London disclaiming all responsibility, writing, "If I had really thrown this bomb, surely I would have nothing to be ashamed of, but in truth I never once thought of it." He is the most generally accepted and widely known suspect and figured as the bomb thrower in The Bomb, Frank Harris's 1908 fictionalization of the tragedy. Written from Schnaubelt's point of view, the story opens with him confessing on his deathbed. However, Harris's description was fictional, and those who knew Schnaubelt vehemently criticized the book.
- George Schwab was a German shoemaker who died in 1924. German anarchist Carl Nold claimed he learned Schwab was the bomber through correspondence with other activists, but no proof ever emerged. Historian Paul Avrich also suspected him but noted that while Schwab was in Chicago, he had only arrived days before. This contradicted statements by others that the bomber was a well-known figure in Chicago.
- George Meng (b. around 1840) was a German anarchist and teamster who owned a small farm outside of Chicago where he had settled in 1883 after emigrating from Bavaria. Like Parsons and Spies, he was a delegate at the Pittsburgh Congress and a member of the IWPA. Meng's granddaughter, Adah Maurer, wrote Paul Avrich a letter in which she said that her mother, who was 15 at the time of the bombing, told her that her father was the bomber. Meng died some time before 1907 in a saloon fire. Based on his correspondence with Maurer, Avrich concluded that there was a "strong possibility" that the little-known Meng may have been the bomber.
- An agent provocateur was suggested by some members of the anarchist movement. Albert Parsons believed the bomber was a member of the police or the Pinkertons trying to undermine the labor movement. However, this contradicts the statements of several activists who said the bomber was one of their own. For example, Lucy Parsons and Johann Most rejected this notion. Dyer Lum said it was "puerile" to ascribe "the Haymarket bomb to a Pinkerton".
- A disgruntled worker was widely suspected. When Fischer was asked if he knew who threw the bomb, he answered, "I suppose it was some excited workingman." Neebe said it was a "crank". Governor Altgeld speculated the bomb thrower might have been a disgruntled worker who was not associated with the defendants or the anarchist movement but had a personal grudge against the police. In his pardoning statement, Altgeld said the record of police brutality toward the workers had invited revenge adding, "Capt. Bonfield is the man who is really responsible for the deaths of the police officers."
- Klemana Schuetz was identified as the bomber by Franz Mayhoff, a New York anarchist and fraudster, who claimed in an affidavit that Schuetz had once admitted throwing the Haymarket bomb. August Wagener, Mayhoff's attorney, sent a telegram from New York to defense attorney Captain William Black the day before the executions claiming knowledge of the bomber's identity. Black tried to delay the execution with this telegram, but Governor Oglesby refused. It was later learned that Schuetz was the primary witness against Mayhoff at his trial for insurance fraud, so Mayhoff's affidavit has never been regarded as credible by historians.
- Reinold "Big" Krueger was killed by police either in the melee after the bombing or in a separate disturbance the next day and has been named as a suspect, but there is no supporting evidence.
- A mysterious outsider was reported by John Philip Deluse, a saloon keeper in Indianapolis who claimed he encountered a stranger in his saloon the day before the bombing. The man was carrying a satchel and on his way from New York to Chicago. According to Deluse, the stranger was interested in the labor situation in Chicago, repeatedly pointed to his satchel and said, "You will hear of some trouble there very soon." Parsons used Deluse's testimony to suggest the bomb thrower was sent by eastern capitalists. Nothing more was ever learned about Deluse's claim.

== Burial and monument ==
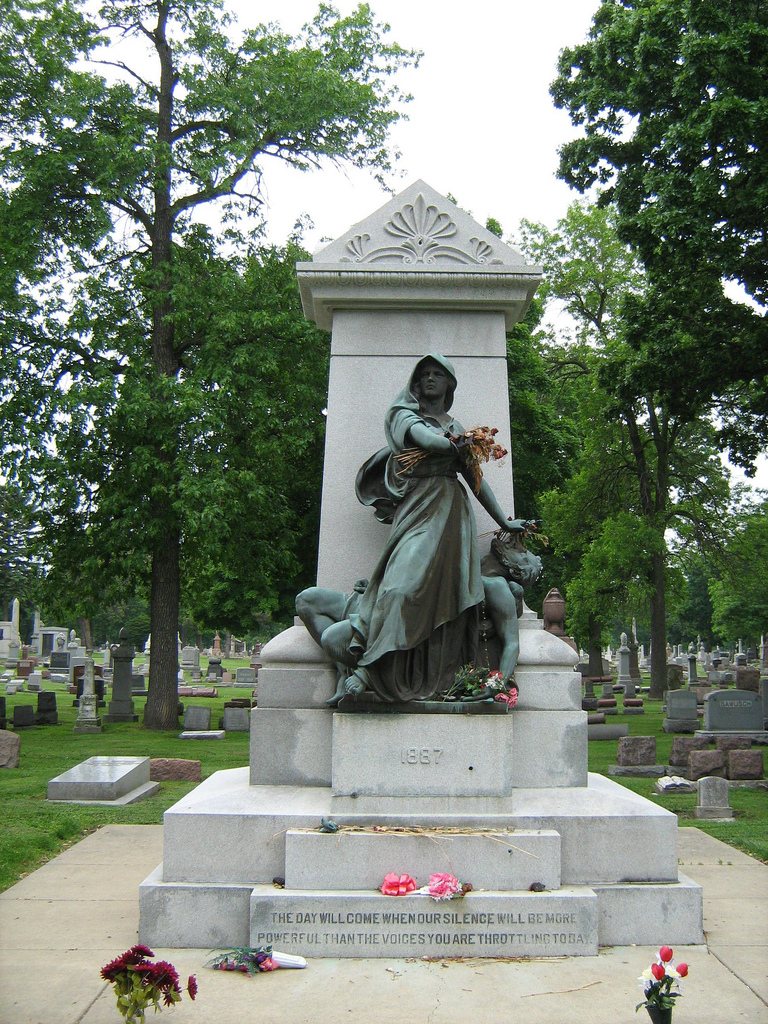
A 2009 image of the Haymarket Martyrs' Monument at the Forest Home Cemetery in Forest Park, Illinois

Lingg, Spies, Fischer, Engel, and Parsons were buried at the German Waldheim Cemetery (later merged with Forest Home Cemetery) in Forest Park, Illinois, a suburb of Chicago. Schwab and Neebe were also buried at Waldheim when they died, reuniting the "Martyrs". In 1893, the Haymarket Martyrs' Monument by sculptor Albert Weinert was raised at Waldheim. Over a century later, it was designated a National Historic Landmark by the United States Department of the Interior.

Throughout the 20th century, activists such as Emma Goldman chose to be buried near the Haymarket Martyrs' Monument graves. In October 2016, a time capsule with materials relating to the Haymarket Affair was dug up in Forest Home Cemetery.

== Memorials ==
In 1889, a commemorative nine-foot (2.7 meter) bronze statue of a Chicago policeman by sculptor Johannes Gelert was erected in the middle of Haymarket Square with private funds raised by the Union League Club of Chicago. The statue was unveiled on May 30, 1889, by Frank Degan, the son of Officer Mathias Degan. On May 4, 1927, the 41st anniversary of the Haymarket Affair, a streetcar jumped its tracks and crashed into the monument. The motorman said he was "sick of seeing that policeman with his arm raised". The city restored the statue in 1928 and moved it to Union Park. During the 1950s, construction of the Kennedy Expressway erased about half of the old, run-down market square, and in 1956, the statue was moved to a special platform built for it overlooking the freeway, near its original location.

The Haymarket statue was vandalized with black paint on May 4, 1968, the 82nd anniversary of the Haymarket Affair, following a confrontation between police and demonstrators at a protest against the Vietnam War. On October 6, 1969, shortly before the "Days of Rage" protests, the statue was destroyed when a bomb was placed between its legs. Weatherman took credit for the blast, which broke nearly 100 windows in the neighborhood and scattered pieces of the statue onto the Kennedy Expressway below. The statue was rebuilt and unveiled on May 4, 1970, to be blown up yet again by Weatherman on October 6, 1970. The statue was rebuilt again, and Mayor Richard J. Daley posted a 24‑hour police guard at the statue. This guard cost $67,440 per year. In 1972, it was moved to the lobby of the Central Police Headquarters, and in 1976 to the enclosed courtyard of the Chicago police academy. For another three decades the statue's empty, graffiti-marked pedestal stood on its platform in the run-down remains of Haymarket Square where it was known as an anarchist landmark. On June 1, 2007, the statue was rededicated at Chicago Police Headquarters with a new pedestal, unveiled by Geraldine Doceka, Officer Mathias Degan's great-granddaughter.

In 1992, the site of the speakers' wagon was marked by a bronze plaque set into the sidewalk, reading:

A decade of strife between labor and industry culminated here in a confrontation that resulted in the tragic death of both workers and policemen. On May 4, 1886, spectators at a labor rally had gathered around the mouth of Crane's Alley. A contingent of police approaching on Des Plaines Street were met by a bomb thrown from just south of the alley. The resultant trial of eight activists gained worldwide attention for the labor movement, and initiated the tradition of "May Day" labor rallies in many cities.

Designated on March 25, 1992,

Richard M. Daley, Mayor

On September 14, 2004, Daley and union leaders—including the president of Chicago's police union—unveiled a monument by Chicago artist Mary Brogger, a fifteen-foot (4.5 m) speakers' wagon sculpture echoing the wagon on which the labor leaders stood in Haymarket Square to champion the eight-hour day. The bronze sculpture, intended to be the centerpiece of a proposed "Labor Park", is meant to symbolize both the rally at Haymarket and free speech. The planned site was to include an international commemoration wall, sidewalk plaques, a cultural pylon, a seating area, and banners, but construction has not yet begun.

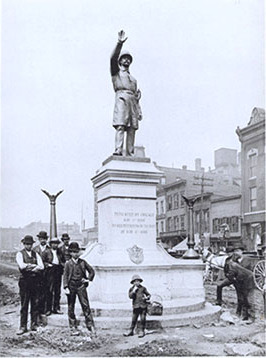
Workers finish installing Gelert's statue of a Chicago policeman in Haymarket Square, 1889. The statue now stands at the Chicago Police Headquarters.

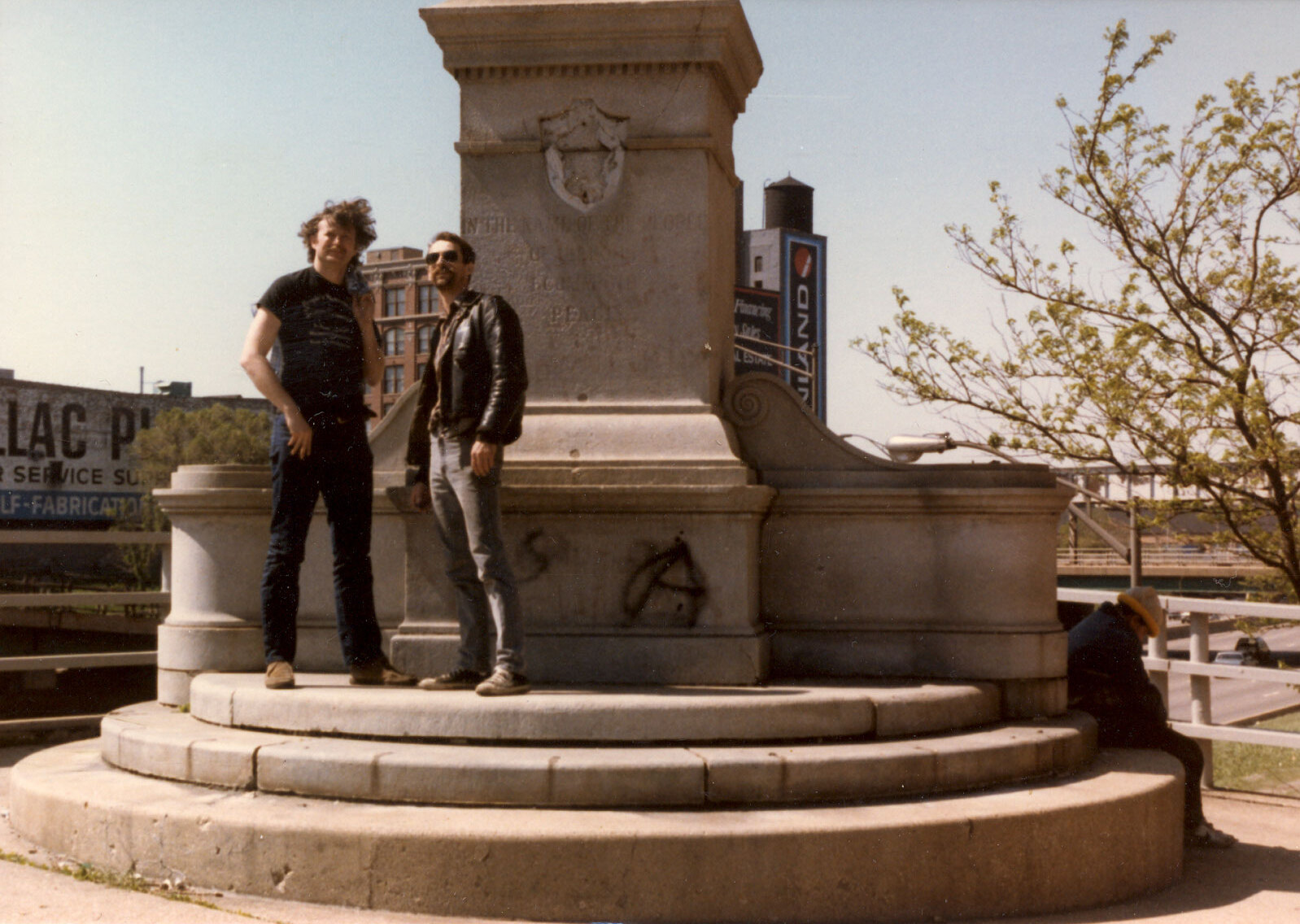
The statue-less pedestal of the police monument on the 100th anniversary of the Haymarket Affair in May 1986; the pedestal has since been removed.

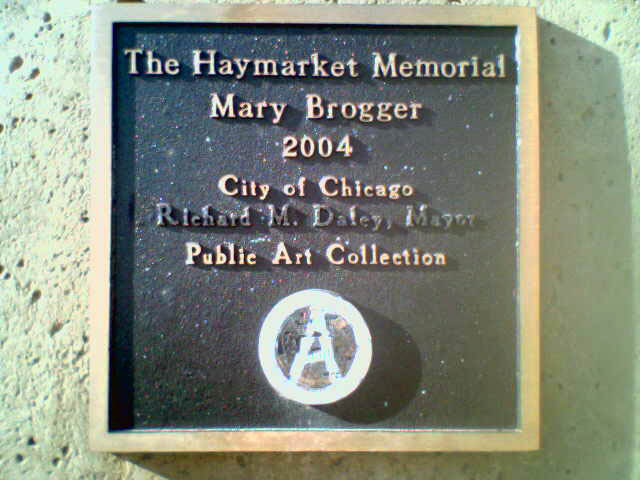
The marker under the Mary Brogger monument, vandalized with a circle-A

== See also ==
- Anti-union violence in the United States
- Argentinos Juniors
- Bay View Massacre (in Milwaukee, Wisconsin, May 5, 1886)
- First Red Scare of 1919–1920
- Galleanisti
- Insurrectionary anarchism
- List of homicides in Illinois
- List of incidents of civil unrest in the United States
- List of massacres in the United States
- List of worker deaths in United States labor disputes
- May Day Riots of 1894
- May Day Riots of 1919
- Palmer Raids of 1919
- Propaganda of the deed
- Sacco and Vanzetti
- Violent labor disputes in the United States
- Wall Street bombing of 1920

== Bibliography ==
- Adelman, William J. (1986) [1976]. Haymarket Revisited (2nd ed.). Chicago: Illinois Labor History Society. ISBN 0-916884-03-1.
- Avrich, Paul (1984). The Haymarket Tragedy. Princeton, NJ: Princeton University Press. ISBN 0-691-00600-8.
- David, Henry (1963) [1936]. The History of the Haymarket Affair: A Study of the American Social-Revolutionary and Labor Movements (3rd ed.). New York: Collier Books. OCLC 6216264.
- Foner, Philip S., ed. (1969). The Autobiographies of the Haymarket Martyrs. New York: Pathfinder Press. ISBN 0-87348-879-2.
- Foner, Philip S. (1986). May Day: A Short History of the International Workers' Holiday, 1886–1986. New York: International Publishers. ISBN 0-7178-0624-3.
- Green, James R. (2006). Death in the Haymarket: A Story of Chicago, the First Labor Movement and the Bombing that Divided Gilded Age America. New York: Pantheon Books. ISBN 0-375-42237-4.
- Messer-Kruse, Timothy (2012). The Haymarket Conspiracy: Transatlantic Anarchist Networks. Urbana, Ill.: University of Illinois Press. ISBN 978-0-252-07860-6.
- Messer-Kruse, Timothy (2011). The Trial of the Haymarket Anarchists: Terrorism and Justice in the Gilded Age. New York: Palgrave Macmillan. ISBN 978-0-230-12077-8.
- Nelson, Bruce C. (1988). Beyond the Martyrs: A Social History of Chicago's Anarchists, 1870–1900. New Brunswick, NJ: Rutgers University Press. ISBN 0-8135-1345-6.
- Roediger, David; Rosemont, Franklin, eds. (1986). Haymarket Scrapbook. Chicago: Charles H. Kerr Publishing Company. ISBN 0-88286-122-0.
- Schaack, Michael J. (1889). Anarchy and Anarchists. A History of the Red Terror and the Social Revolution in America and Europe. Communism, Socialism, and Nihilism in Doctrine and in Deed. The Chicago Haymarket Conspiracy, and the Detection and Trial of the Conspirators. Chicago: F. J. Schulte & Co. OCLC 185637808.
- Smith, Carl (2000). "The Dramas of Haymarket". Chicago Historical Society and Northwestern University.
- White, Richard (2017). The Republic for Which It Stands. The Oxford History of the United States. Oxford University Press. p. 0. ISBN 978-0199735815.
