= Tompkins Square Riots =

Several riots have occurred in New York City's Tompkins Square Park, including:

- 1874 Tompkins Square Park riot
- 1988 Tompkins Square Park riot
