= Thomas Dent (lawyer) =

American lawyer (1831–1924)

Thomas Ijams Dent
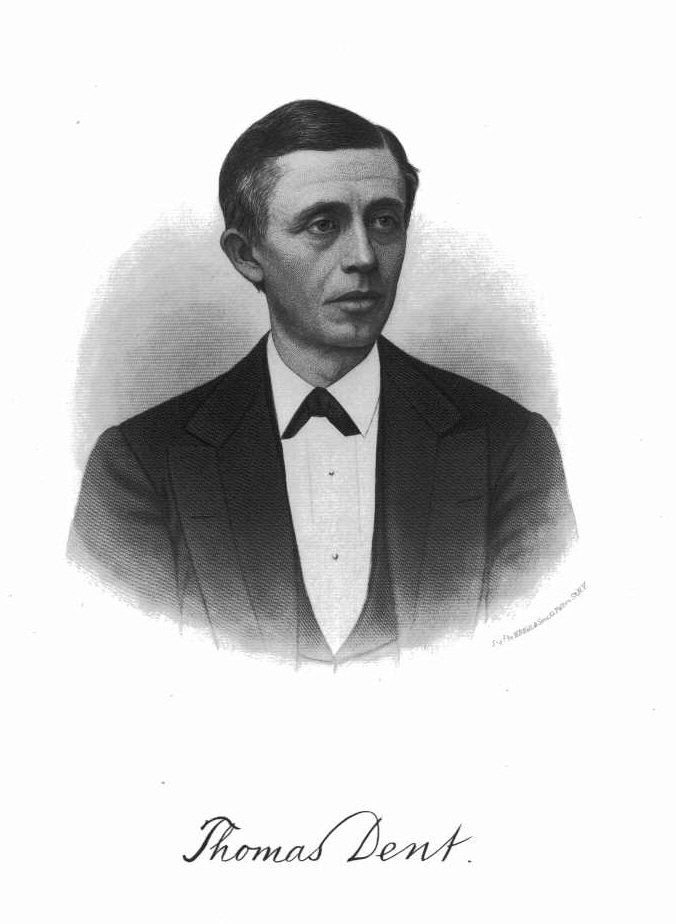
- Born: November 14, 1831; Hennepin, Illinois
- Died: December 25, 1924 (aged 93); Chicago, Illinois
- Resting place: Graceland Cemetery
- Occupation: Lawyer

Thomas Ijams Dent (November 14, 1831 – December 25, 1924) was a prominent Chicago lawyer.

== Biography ==
Dent was born in Hennepin, Illinois, the son of George Dent and Comfort (Ijams) Dent. George Dent held a number of elective offices in Putnam County, including clerk of the circuit and county courts, county judge, and member of the Illinois House of Representatives in 1853 and 1864. Thomas Dent was educated at public schools in Illinois and Ohio, and then, at age 15, became permanently employed as his father's assistant.

After studying law on his own, Dent was admitted to the bar in 1854, at which time he established a law practice in Hennepin, Illinois. He moved to Chicago in 1856, forming a legal partnership with Martin R. M. Wallace. Dent married Susan Strawn in 1857. Also in 1857, he moved to Peoria, Illinois, but was back in Chicago the next year, and in 1860 formed a partnership (Arrington & Dent) with Judge A. W. Arrington that would last until Arrington's death in 1867. At that point Dent joined forces with William P. Black to establish a new law firm, Dent & Black. Dent had a successful practice with many corporate clients, including banks, insurance companies, a railroad company, and the Chicago Board of Trade. Dent argued several cases to the Supreme Court of the United States.

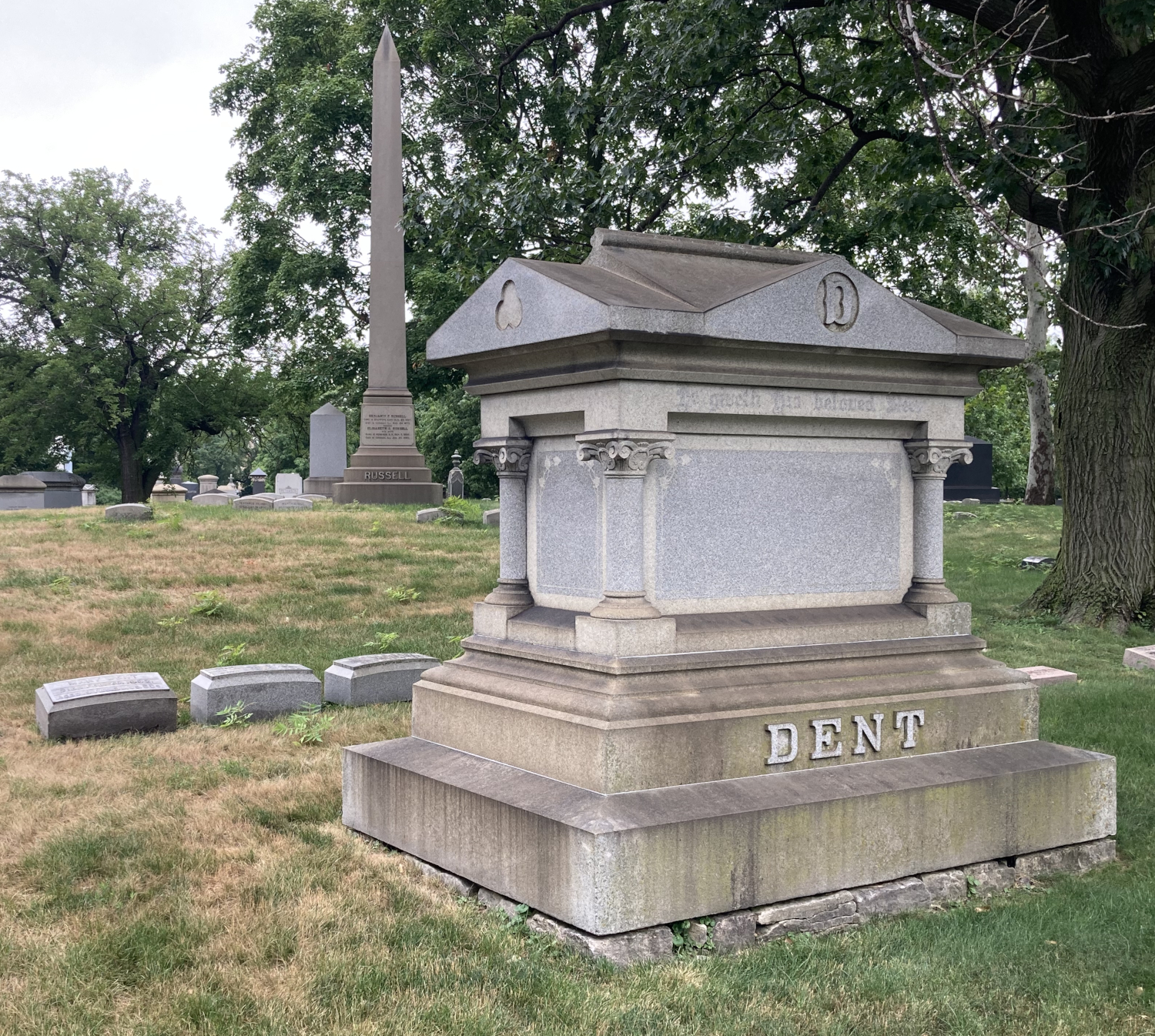
Dent's grave at Graceland Cemetery

In 1879, Dent ran unsuccessfully for a seat on the Supreme Court of Illinois on the Republican ticket.

Dent served as president of the Chicago Law Institute, the Chicago Bar Association, and then, in 1888, as president of the Illinois State Bar Association.

An elder of the Presbyterian Church in the United States of America, Dent served as a director of the McCormick Theological Seminary for nearly 4 decades.

He died in Chicago on December 25, 1924, and was buried at Graceland Cemetery.
