= George Engel =

Labor union activist

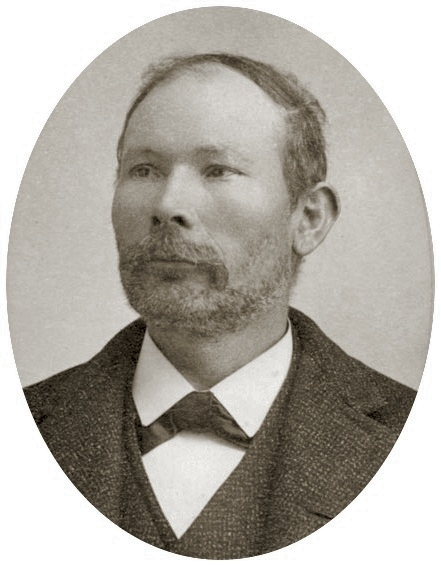
- Born: April 15, 1836; Kassel, Electorate of Hesse
- Died: November 11, 1887 (aged 51); Cook County Jail, Illinois, United States
- Occupation: Toy store owner
- Status: Executed by hanging
- Conviction: Conspiracy to commit murder
- Penalty: Death

George Engel (April 15, 1836 – November 11, 1887) was a labor union activist executed after the Haymarket riot, along with Albert Parsons, August Spies, and Adolph Fischer.

== Early life ==
Engel was born to an impoverished family with three other children. His father, Konrad, a mason and bricklayer, died when he was one year old. His mother died when he was 12, leaving him an orphan. He lived for a short time with a foster family, but at the age of 14 was forced to look for work. He was apprenticed to a shoemaker, but was unable to afford the dues.

He travelled to Frankfurt and finally found work as a painter's apprentice. He travelled around Germany working, and in 1868 opened a business of his own. He married the same year, but found that the economic conditions in Germany made survival difficult, and so decided to follow his boyhood dream of emigrating to the United States. He left Germany in 1872, arriving first in Philadelphia, Pennsylvania, in January 1873, where he worked in a sugar refinery. In 1874, he left Philadelphia and moved to Chicago, Illinois, where he later, in 1876, opened his own toyshop.

== Activism ==
Working at a factory, Engel first became acquainted with socialism when one of his coworkers took him to a meeting of the International Workingmen's Association. He soon joined. In 1878, a crackdown on socialist organizations led to the dissolution of the IWA, but Engel was instrumental in forming another organization, the Socialistic Labor Party of North America, and finally, in 1882 he joined the new International Working People's Association.

== Haymarket Square ==
On May 3, 1886, after hearing about the massacre at the McCormick Plant earlier that day, he attended a meeting at Grief's Hall. This meeting, later dubbed by prosecutors the "Monday Night Conspiracy", was used to prove that there was a conspiracy in the bombing at the Haymarket. A witness claimed that Engel had arranged a plan to storm and/or dynamite police stations and shoot policemen should trouble occur. Engel claims it was a meeting only "in which it was proposed to give aid to any strikers if the police or the Pinkertons should attack said strikers."

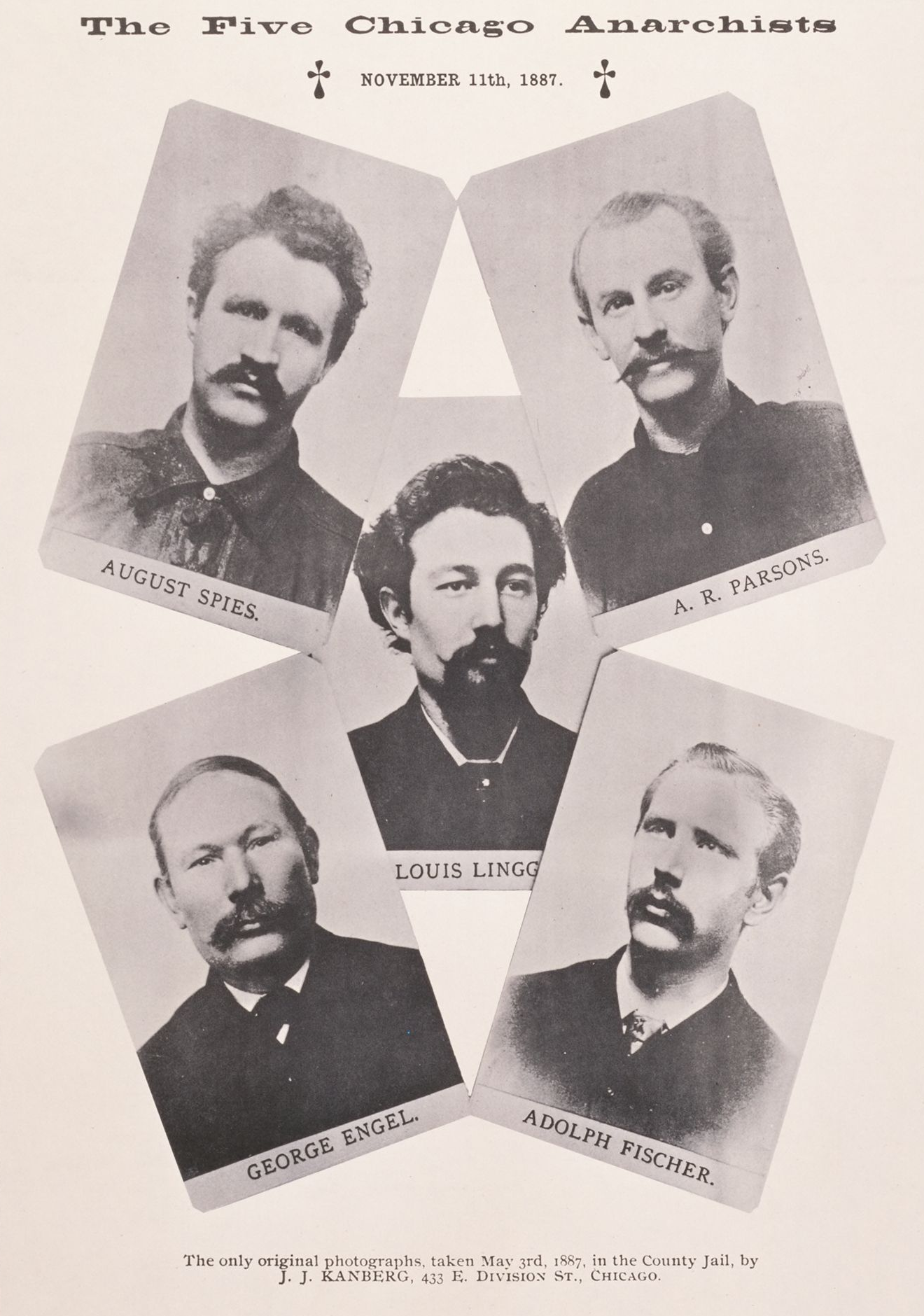
Mug shots of the four anarchists executed–and Louis Lingg, who committed suicide–taken by J. J. Kanberg at the Cook County Jail, May 3, 1887

The following night, May 4, as the bombing took place, Engel was not in Haymarket Square, but was at home playing cards. Nevertheless, he was arrested the next day and charged with conspiracy in the bombings. At 50, he was the oldest of the defendants to stand trial. He was convicted and was sentenced to be hanged. After hearing in 1887 that several letters had been written from Samuel Fielden and Michael Schwab to Illinois Governor Richard James Oglesby, Engel wrote his own letter asking the governor not to consider any clemency, stating that: "not being conscious of any guilt, the powers that be may murder me, but they cannot legally punish me. I protest against a commutation of my sentence and demand either liberty or death." [emphasis in original]

== Death ==
Engel was hanged with three others of the condemned on November 11, 1887. His last words were "Hurrah for anarchy!" His execution during the Haymarket affair helped result in the date chosen for International Workers' Day.

Engel was buried, in a plot marked since 1893 by the Haymarket Martyrs Monument, in the Waldheim Cemetery (now Forest Home Cemetery) in Forest Park, Illinois.

== See also ==
- Dyer Lum
