= William P. Black =

William Perkins Black
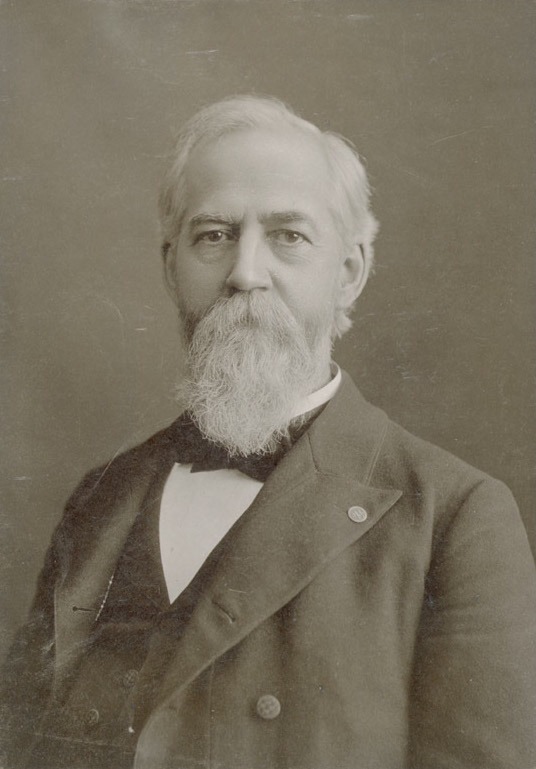
- Born: November 11, 1842; Woodford County, Kentucky, US
- Died: January 3, 1916 (aged 73); Chicago, Illinois, US
- Burial place: Graceland Cemetery
- Military career
- Allegiance: United States
- Branch: Union Army
- Service years: 1861–1864
- Rank: Captain
- Units: 11th Regiment Indiana Volunteer Infantry; 37th Regiment Illinois Volunteer Infantry
- Conflicts: Battle of Pea Ridge
- Awards: Medal of Honor

Signature
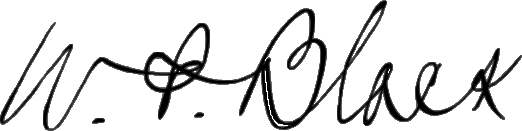

William Perkins Black (November 11, 1842 – January 3, 1916) was a lawyer and veteran of the American Civil War. He received America's highest military decoration – the Medal of Honor – for his actions at the Battle of Pea Ridge, Arkansas, in 1862.

== Biography ==
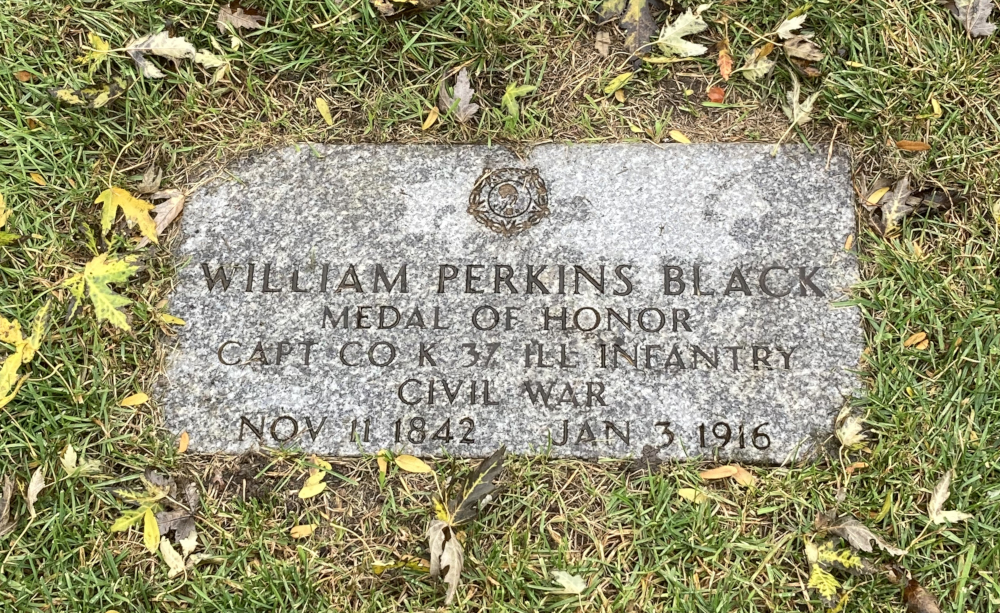
Black's grave at Graceland Cemetery

He was the brother of John C. Black, Commander of the Grand Army of the Republic, who was also a Medal of Honor recipient. The Black brothers are one of only five pairs of brothers to have received the Medal of Honor.

In 1867, together with Thomas Dent, Black founded the law firm of Dent & Black. As a lawyer, Black was best known for having served as defense counsel to the people charged with inciting the Haymarket Riot of 1886.

He died at his home in Chicago on January 3, 1916, and was buried at Graceland Cemetery.

== Medal of Honor citation ==
Rank and organization: Captain, Company K, 37th Illinois Infantry. Place and date: At Pea Ridge, Ark., 7 March 1862. Entered service at: Danville, Ill. Born: 11 November 1842, Woodford, Ky. Date of issue: 2 October 1893.

Citation:

Single-handedly confronted the enemy, firing a rifle at them and thus checking their advance within 100 yards of the lines.

== See also ==
- List of Medal of Honor recipients
- List of American Civil War Medal of Honor recipients: A–F
