= Beyond the Martyrs =

1988 book by Bruce C. Nelson

- Author: Bruce C. Nelson
- Subject: History of anarchism
- Publisher: Rutgers University Press
- Publication date: 1988
- Pages: 305

Beyond the Martyrs: A Social History of Chicago's Anarchists, 1870–1900 is a 1988 history of anarchism in Chicago written by Bruce C. Nelson and published by Rutgers University Press.
