= May Day riots of 1894 =

Violent demonstrations in Cleveland, Ohio

- Date: May 1, 1894
- Location: Cleveland, Ohio
- Caused by: Unemployment

Parties
Unemployed rioters	Cleveland Police Department

Number
5,000	

The May Day riots of 1894 were a series of violent demonstrations that occurred throughout Cleveland, Ohio on May 1, 1894 (May Day). Cleveland's unemployment rate increased dramatically during the Panic of 1893. Finally, riots broke out among the unemployed who condemned city leaders for their ineffective relief measures. According to The New York Times, "[t]he desire to stop work seemed to take possession of every laborer..." on May Day of 1894.

== Background ==
May Day, or International Workers' Day was a day for remembering the workers who died during the Haymarket affair of 1886. During a General Strike in Chicago, Illinois, an unknown person threw a bomb into the crowd, prompting police to fire into the crowd, killing civilians and police alike. The same day in 1890, Raymond Lavigne called for international demonstrations to commemorate the day. In 1894 the Pullman Strike in Illinois, as well as this series of unemployed workers' riots on May Day in Cleveland, prompted U.S. President Grover Cleveland to propose a bill that would make a Labor Day a national public holiday. After the Haymarket Square riot in May, 1886, US President Grover Cleveland feared that commemorating Labor Day on May 1 could become an opportunity to commemorate the riots. May Day celebrations have diminished in the United States, because of the creation of Labor Day.

=== Causes ===
One of the major causes of the riots was the Panic of 1893. The panic precipitated one of the most severe depressions in American history. The closure of two major railroads and other major companies triggered a stock market collapse. The New York banks had heavily invested in the stock market, and bank failures soon began. This caused a contraction of credit, and many other, newer, businesses started to shut down as well. The depression produced widespread social unrest, mostly among the now-unemployed workers. Some people tried to create public works programs for the unemployed, but this was unsuccessful.

=== Effects ===
The riots of 1894, along with the Haymarket Affair, brought about a series of discussions about the workforce in America and the depression. In 1904, the International Socialist Conference meeting in Amsterdam called on "all Social Democratic Party organizations and trade unions of all countries to demonstrate energetically on May First for the legal establishment of the 8-hour day, for the class demands of the proletariat, and for universal peace." The congress made it "mandatory upon the proletarian organizations of all countries to stop work on May 1, wherever it is possible without injury to the workers."

== Events ==
The city was suffering from an economic crisis. Eventually scores of people lost their jobs and this led to the massive demonstrations and rallies. These became violent and led to confrontations with authorities. The mob consisted of around 4 000 men, who were said to be "a rabble made up chiefly of foreigners". The mob marched through the manufacturing district of the city, called "The Flats" armed with clubs and stones. Much property was destroyed, but they were ultimately taken down by the police. Men with flags shouted to the crowd to encourage them to join the riots, but only about a dozen boys joined them. The square was abandoned as the mob marched on. The crowd was "hooting and jeering those who didn't join them."

They then attacked firemen, believing they were police. The firemen held their ground as clubs flew. They soon met up with the leader of the mob, who encouraged them to keep peace; he was ignored. They entered the foundry department, where workmen were forced to halt. One man attempted to restart his work, but was held by mob members while others fled from the building. Shops were closed and barred, while employees fled.

Mobmen all ran at the Standard Paint Works with the cry "Victory!" The workers of the shop joined the ranks of the men in their attack of the Upson Nut Works. People threw coal at the shop, breaking windows and knocking down workers before they had the chance to retreat. Many men on the inside of the factory were injured in the raid. The coal-throwing stopped as the mob rushed the gates. This slight resistance made the mob take "vengeance by tearing the doors and gates to pieces." The men then took complete possession over the building, and workers fled in terror. Everything breakable in the shop was destroyed. They left the destroyed shop and went down the railroad tracks to the main office of the company.

The police came, which deterred the mob for a short period of time. They took over the coal carts and used them as barriers as they surrounded the police; they threw stones at them. Some of the rioters were scared by the presence of the police, and fled. The crowd of 5 000 "dwindled to half that number." The leaders of the riot planned an attack on the Faulhaber Furniture Company; but the police stopped them before there could be a repeat of the event at the Upson factory. The police grew to such numbers that they "presented a formidable appearance." They dispersed the rioters and arrested their leader, Tom Moore.

The eastern part of the city was little better off. A throng of 200 Italians marched through the streets armed with clubs, iron and wire rods, and gate posts. At Gates's quarry there were speeches and threats; workers dropped their tools and joined them. The same speeches and threats were made at Neff's quarry, and more men joined. At Reader's quarry, there was little opposition. They broke into boarding houses and compelled more to join them.

The Mayor urged the people not to riot, and called for police forces to be assembled. He stated that the city would use every power to maintain law and order. Armories were prepared for discharge at the mayor's order.

Another mob forced the workers of the United Salt Company out. They proceeded to the Cleveland Rolling Mills where they met by the police. After several minutes of serious clubbing, the mob dispersed in every direction. Seven men, all with broken heads, were arrested.

Policemen were stationed in the public square to prevent any gathering there. There was also considerable fear that the rioters would gather the dynamite used by the railroad companies to blow up factories and private residences; however, there is no evidence that they did so.

== Related ==
- May Day riots of 1919
- Haymarket affair, May 4, 1886 in Chicago, Illinois
- Bituminous Coal Miners' Strike
- List of incidents of civil unrest in the United States
