= 1874 Tompkins Square Park riot =

Riot and civil disorder in New York City

Tompkins Square Park riot
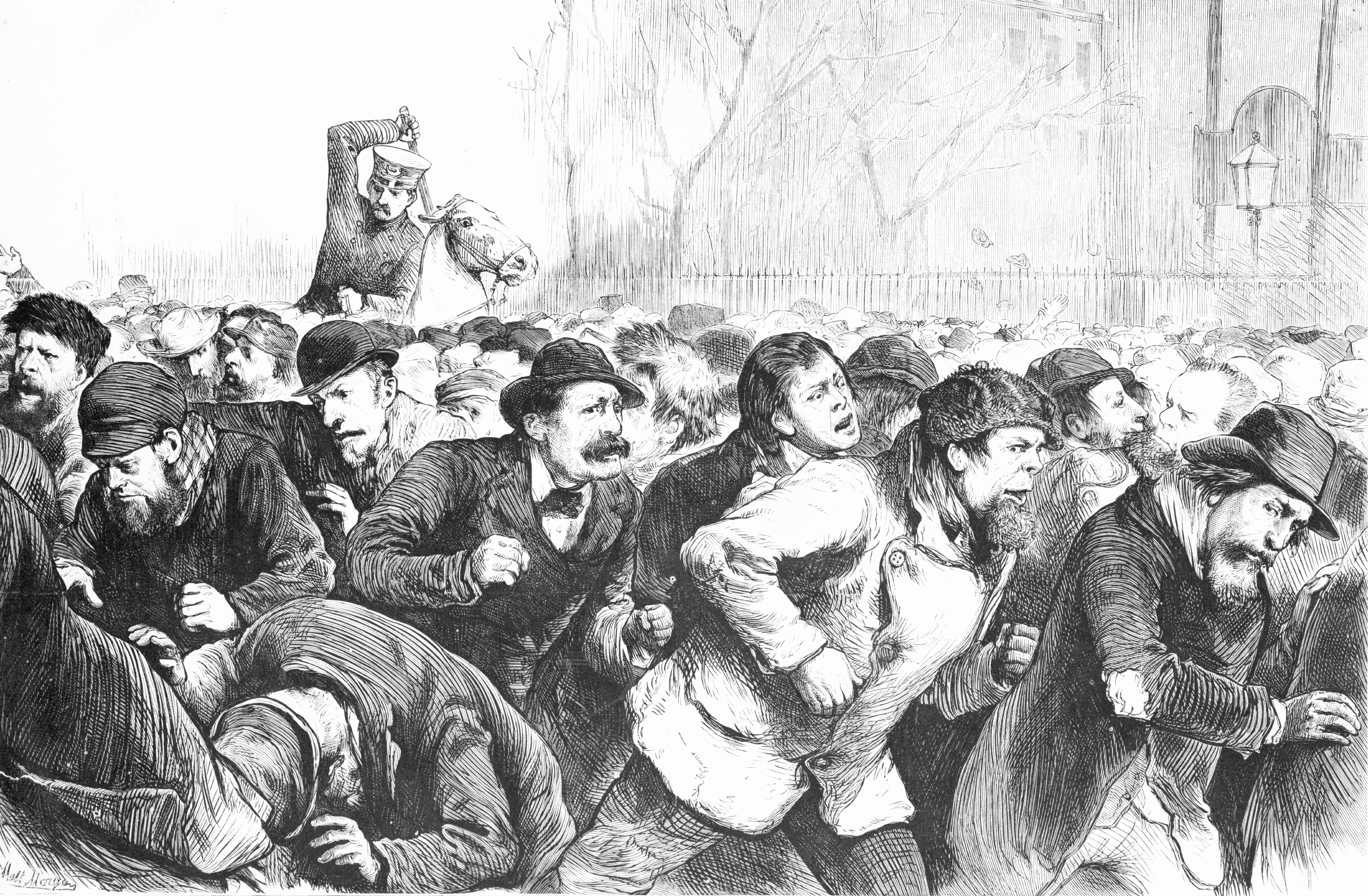
- Crowd driven from Tompkins Square by the mounted police
- Date: January 13, 1874
- Location: New York City; 40°43′43″N 73°58′53″W
- Goals: Panic of 1873 labor relief
- Methods: Strikes, Protest, Demonstrations

Parties
The Committee of Safety in New York City; Tenth Ward Workingmen's Association	New York police

Lead figures
Patrick Dunn; Joseph Hoefflicher; Samuel Gompers	William F. Havemeyer; Abram Duryée

Casualties and losses
Deaths: Injuries: Arrests: 46	Deaths: Injuries:
- New York City

The Tompkins Square Park riot occurred on January 13, 1874, at Tompkins Square Park in what is now the East Village and Alphabet City neighborhoods of Manhattan, New York City. The riot started after the New York City Police Department clashed with a demonstration involving thousands of unemployed civilians.

== Background ==
The riot occurred in the midst of the Panic of 1873, a depression that began in 1873 and lasted until 1877. Workers' movements throughout the United States had been making demands of the government to help ease the strain of the depression. Organizations rejected offers of charity and instead asked for public works programs that would provide jobs for the masses of unemployed. Formed in December 1873, The Committee of Safety in New York City tried to organize a meeting with city officials but was denied any such opportunity.

The Panic of 1873 left workers impoverished and drove workers' demands and the subsequent riot. The Bureau of statistics in Massachusetts had found that the majority of working men then were unable to support their families from their earnings, and depended on the assistance of their children in order not to be in poverty and debt. Meanwhile, workers also had to deal with inflation as prices for rent, fuel and clothing didn't fall to meet decreased wages.

Evictions had become widespread and people roamed the streets looking for food to eat. In New York City, there were over 90,000 homeless workers, almost half of them women, who were forced to sleep in police stations. They became known as "revolvers" because they could only stay in a police station for a few nights a month and therefore had to keep moving.

In response, the committee organized a demonstration for January 13, 1874 to meet in Tompkins Square Park, which had often been used as a gathering point for demonstrations, and planned to march to City Hall. Demonstrators would demand that Mayor William F. Havemeyer establish a public works program to generate employment opportunities by donating $100,000 to a Labor Relief Bureau to be established by the committee.

A separate organization, headed by Patrick Dunn, then called for a more militant demonstration on January 5, urging workers to use direct action if the government did not respond to demands. Members of the Committee of Safety attended the protest, at first trying to discourage workers from marching to City Hall that day but then joining the committee that led the march once it became clear that the demonstration could not be prevented. The demonstrators' demands were turned down by Aldermen at City Hall, and Committee of Safety members encouraged people to return for another demonstration on January 8.

Over 1,000 people showed up for the January 8th demonstration in Union Square. The police also sent one precinct's full reserve force. Dunn proposed for the crowd to march on City Hall again but was outnumbered by Committee of Safety supporters, who instead chose to march to Tompkins Square. At Tompkins Square, several demands, including the 8-hour day, were voted for, and the crowd was then encouraged to return again on January 13 for the original march organized by the Committee of Safety. Another precinct had its reserve force ready in Tompkins Square, but the police did not take any action that day.

The Committee of Safety's attempts to pacify the movement did not bring them any sympathy however. Across the city, newspapers warned of the menace that the Committee represented. It was rumored that weapons had been bought with jewels stolen in Paris by Communards. The Police Board refused to allow the demonstration to come near City Hall, instead advising for the committee to march to Union Square. When asked, Governor John Adams Dix rejected the committee's pleas to intervene on their behalf in the matter.

In the end, the Committee decided not to have a march at all but simply hold the meeting in Tompkins Square Park for which they had already received the permit from the Department of Parks. At the request of the Police Board, however, the Department of Parks revoked the permit the night before the meeting. The police claimed to have told the Committee of Safety organizer Peter J. McGuire about the change of decision, who claimed to have been out when the message was delivered. The Department of Parks decision certainly was not made known to the masses of protesters in time to cancel the demonstration the next morning.

== The riot ==
Over 7,000 workers gathered in Tompkins Square Park on January 13, 1874, including about 1,200 workers from the German Tenth Ward Workingmen's Association. This was the largest demonstration that New York City had ever seen. Roughly 1,600 policemen were stationed in the surrounding area. There were no notices in sight, however, to inform the crowd that the meeting's permit had been revoked.

Shortly after 10 a.m., police entered the square and dispersed most of the crowd from the park, beating people with clubs. Other police on horseback cleared the surrounding streets. Men from the German Tenth Ward Workingmen's Association fought back, attempting to defend the square. One policeman was hit in the head with a hammer. Christian Mayer was arrested for the incident.

Samuel Gompers described the events and his experiences: "mounted police charged the crowd on Eighth Street, riding them down and attacking men, women, and children without discrimination. It was an orgy of brutality. I was caught in the crowd on the street and barely saved my head from being cracked by jumping down a cellarway."

Panic spread across New York the rest of the day. One school was put under police protection as it was rumored that immigrants were planning to burn it down. City Alderman Kehr claimed that he had to jump off a street car to escape from protesters.

== Aftermath ==
A total of 46 arrests were made in connection with the January 13 Tompkins Square meeting. Bail was set at $1000 for each arrestee (over $22,000 adjusted for inflation in 2022). Mayer, along with as his fellow Tenth Ward Workingmen's Association member, Joseph Hoefflicher, received assault charges, and both went to jail for several months. Mayer was finally pardoned at the end of the summer by Governor Dix after a campaign led by a socialist newspaper. A third German worker, Justus Schwab, who had been arrested for carrying a red flag, was charged with incitement to riot. Schwab's East First Street saloon, a meeting place for radicals, was memorialized in 2012 with a plaque placed by the Greenwich Village Society for Historic Preservation.

The unemployed movement lost much momentum after the riot. Efforts to organize another march proved to be futile. With the exception of the campaign to pardon Mayer, support was not sustained for those who were injured or arrested in the riot. By the end of the month, the Committee of Safety dissolved itself to form the Industrial Political Party, which was then also dissolved later that year.

Attempts were made to have members of the Police Board fired over the incident. John Swinton, editor at the New York Sun, described police actions as an "outrage" in statements made at the New York State Assembly's Committee on Grievances. These were later published as a pamphlet, The Tompkins Square Outrage, but the campaign to have the Board fired never succeeded. At the same time, the New York City Police Department increased their surveillance and harassment of political organizations. They were able to intimidate landlords into evicting radical groups and canceling meetings on their premises. A church fire was wrongly blamed on radicals, and rumor of a Communist plot to kill the mayor was circulated, both in an attempt to justify police actions.

== See also ==
- List of incidents of civil unrest in New York City
- List of incidents of civil unrest in the United States

== Bibliography ==
- Gutman, Herbert G. (1965). "The Tompkins square "Riot" in New York City on January 13, 1874: A re‐examination of its causes and its aftermath". Labor History. 6 (1): 44–70. doi:10.1080/00236566508583955. ISSN 0023-656X.
