= 1919 May Day riots =

Riots in Cleveland, Ohio

Cleveland May Day riots
- Part of First Red Scare
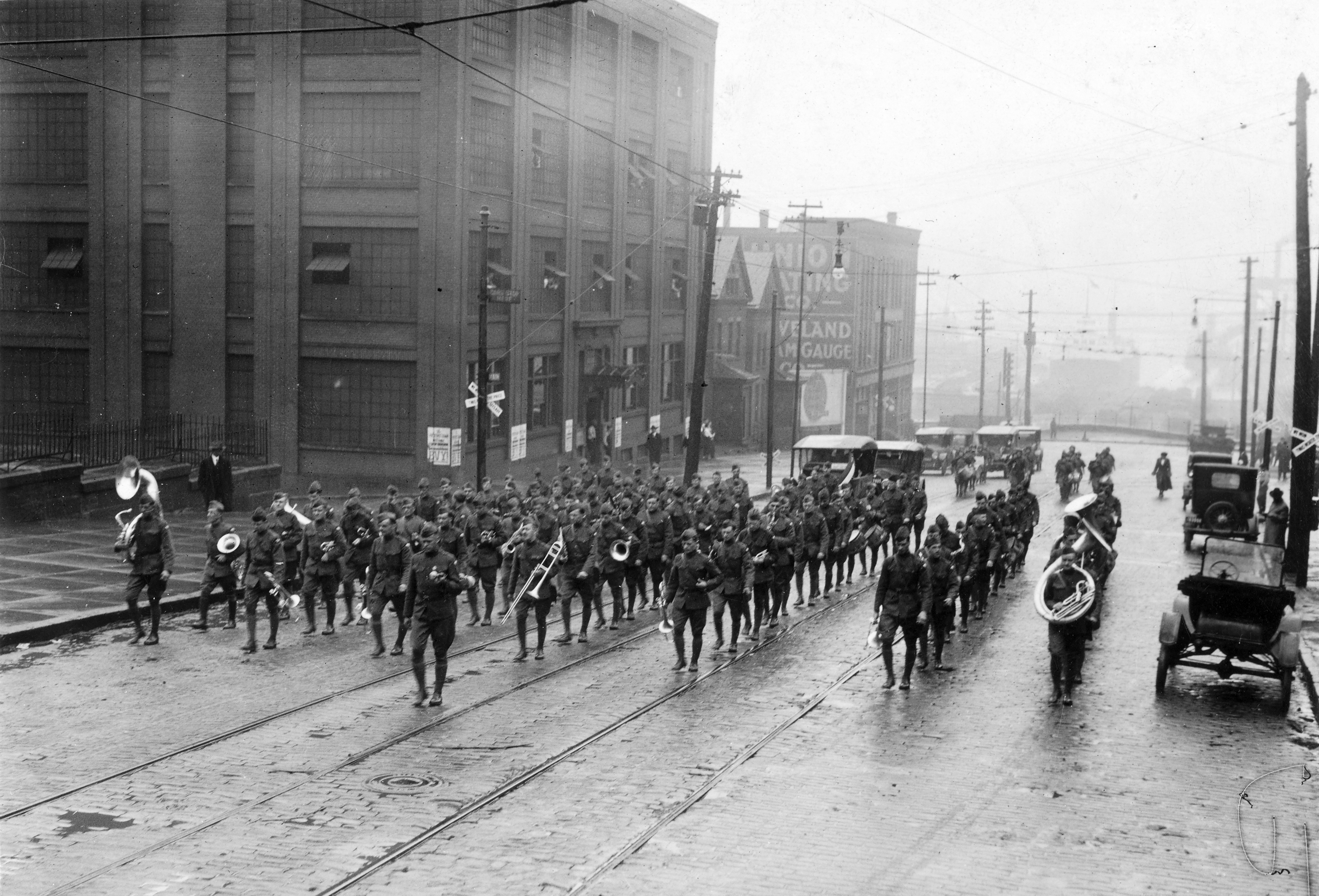
- Pershing's Band escort William Gibbs McAdoo from Union Station, Cleveland, May Day 1919
- Date: May 1, 1919
- Location: Cleveland, Ohio, U.S.

Parties
Cleveland Police Department, anti-socialist civilians	Local socialists, communists, unionists, and the Industrial Workers of the World (IWW)	Liberty loan workers

Lead figures
Captain C.D. Paxton	Charles Ruthenberg	William Gibbs McAdoo

Casualties
- Deaths: 2
- Injuries: 40+
- Arrested: 116

The Cleveland May Day riots of 1919 were a series of violent demonstrations that occurred throughout Cleveland, Ohio on May 1 (May Day), 1919. The riots occurred during the May Day parade organized by Socialist leader Charles Ruthenberg, of local trade unionists, socialists, communists, and the Industrial Workers of the World (IWW) to protest against the conviction of Eugene V. Debs and against American intervention in the Russian Civil War against the Bolsheviks.

== Background ==
The previous year, Eugene Debs's Federal Court trial was held in Cleveland, and Charles Ruthenberg's Socialist Party chose to hold a march which would both protest against Debs' imprisonment as well as help promote Ruthenberg's own candidacy for Mayor of Cleveland. The procession consisted of 32 groups divided into four units, each holding a Socialist flag and an American flag at its head. Although the cause of the riots is disputed, repeated demands by the police and army personnel that the marchers relinquish their flags reportedly became a flashpoint.

The Cleveland chapter of the Socialist Party had been much more radical than other Socialist Party chapters in the Midwest. The Cleveland political establishment of the time prevented the popular Cleveland Socialist Party from acquiring any political power which brewed resentment and radicalism among the party. Cleveland was a large industrial city of blue-collar workers, many of whom were immigrants or the descendants of immigrants. This population was very sympathetic to the Socialist Party and left-wing politics. In 1917, leftist hopes were boosted by news of the Russian Revolution and the rise of Vladimir Lenin and the Bolsheviks to power in Petrograd. That same year, Ruthenberg ran for mayor of Cleveland and attained almost 30% of the vote.

== Event ==
According to the Cleveland Bicentennial Commission, as they marched to Cleveland's Public Square, one of the units was stopped on Superior Avenue by a group of Victory Liberty Loan workers, who demanded that they lower their flags. At some point, an army lieutenant leading a number of soldiers likewise directed the marchers to discard their flags. When the marchers refused to do so, the lieutenant ordered his soldiers to attack. Mass fighting broke out immediately. A call for reserves brought several mounted police who charged their horses directly into the crowd and swung their clubs indiscriminately. In this ensuing melee, over twenty marchers were severely injured by the clubs, and ambulances from nearby hospitals were dispatched to rescue the many wounded.

After the first riot had been quelled, a second riot began in the downtown area; specifically, the Public Square where former Secretary of the Treasury William Gibbs McAdoo was addressing a Victory Loan rally at Keith's Hippodrome. An army lieutenant ordered socialists to clear away from a speaking platform, and directed his men to attack all those who did not comply with his orders. Mounted policemen with clubs and army tanks charged the crowd. Seventy individuals were arrested and incarcerated at the Central Police Station.

A third riot then occurred on Euclid Avenue in the heart of the shopping district. Later in the evening, Ruthenberg's socialist party headquarters on Prospect Avenue was ransacked by soldiers, police, and armed civilians. This latter mob "completely demolished the building" and "typewriters and office furniture were thrown into the street." Towards the end of the day, the anti-socialists piled "scores of red flags and banners" — which they had taken by force from the marchers — at the foot of the Soldiers and Sailors' Monument in Public Square and set them alight in a giant bonfire.

== Aftermath ==
The police used mounts, army trucks, and tanks in response to the protests. Casualties amounted to two people killed, forty injured, and 116 arrested, including Ruthenberg himself on a charge of "assault with intent to kill". Local newspapers quickly pointed out that only eight of those arrested were born in the United States. In response to the riots, the city government immediately passed laws to restrict parades and the display of red flags. Overall, the occurrence is seen as the most violent of a series of similar disorders that took place throughout the U.S. as a result of the First Red Scare.

This account is disputed by the IWW in the newspaper The New Solidarity, in which they outline that those there, celebrating May Day had not violated any city ordinance to incite rioting, and that the then Republican mayor of Cleveland, Harry L. Davis, had issued an order to the police to suppress any violations of law with "promptness and firmness" setting the tone of how police should respond to the event.

They detail that as those at the event were incited by police and self-described "patriots", causing a disturbance, but not a riot; this then was detailed as the pretense for the police to move in to suppress the perceived riot in order to "suppress lawlessness" by using mounted police and ^{[a]} German tanks, taken from Germany after World War I, were used indiscriminately by the police and army despite the fact there were women and children in attendance. ^{[b]} The article suggested that the deaths and injuries were the results of police acting to break up the celebration and that overall, there were 130 sentenced and/or fined.

== See also ==
- 1919 United States anarchist bombings
- May Day Riots of 1894
- 1886's Haymarket Riot, at the origin of May Day.
- List of incidents of civil unrest in the United States

== Notes ==
The Encyclopedia of Cleveland History article cited says one tank was used "from the Western Front"

- The New Solidarity (May 10, 1919) - Front Page:
  - Several parades started from different parts of town to converge at the public square. The paraders, but were soon being heckled by the police and "patriots", with the result that a "riot" was started.
  - In suppressing the riot the mounted police and several tanks were used to support the patrolmen. In driving the war tanks thru [sic] the streets, there was no effort made to avoid women and children, but all were compelled to run for their lives. Part of the war tanks were those taken from Germany at the close of the war.
