= The Haymarket Conspiracy =

2012 book by Timothy Messer-Kruse

- First edition
- Author: Timothy Messer-Kruse
- Subject: American history, history of anarchism
- Publisher: University of Illinois Press
- Publication date: August 2012
- Pages: 256
- ISBN: 978-0-252-03705-4

The Haymarket Conspiracy: Transatlantic Anarchist Networks is a 2012 book by historian Timothy Messer-Kruse on the Haymarket affair and the origins of American anarchism.
