= Beer and Revolution =

2007 book by Tom Goyens

- Subject: American history, labor history
- Publisher: University of Illinois Press
- Publication date: 2007
- Pages: 296
- ISBN: 978-0-252-03175-5

Beer and Revolution: The German Anarchist Movement in New York City, 1880–1914 is a 2007 history book by Tom Goyens following the lives of German immigrant radicals in New York City.
