= Timothy Messer-Kruse =

American historian (born 1963)

- Occupation: Historian

Academic background
- Education: University of Wisconsin-Madison

Academic work
- Main interests: Labor history

Timothy F. Messer-Kruse is an American historian who specializes in American labor history. His research into the 1886 Haymarket affair led him to reappraise the conventional narrative that the trial was a miscarriage of justice, arguing to the contrary it was fairly conducted by standards of the era. He has also written on banking history and race relations in the United States.

== Life and career ==
In the early 2000s Messer-Kruse was prompted to study the original court documents from the Haymarket affair trials. Despite the prevailing belief that little or no evidence was presented at trial, he noted that evidence had been presented over the course of six weeks. He published his findings in books and academic papers including The Haymarket Conspiracy. Messer-Kruse and editors of Wikipedia were subsequently involved in a conflict over the content and editing procedure of the Wikipedia article on the Haymarket affair. In 2012, Messer-Kruse described his experiences in the Chronicle of Higher Education, on the NPR podcast On The Media, in The Atlantic, and on National Public Radio. In 2023, Messer-Kruse was added to TPUSA's Professor Watchlist.

== Publications ==
- The Yankee International: Marxism and the American Reform Tradition, 1848-1876. University of North Carolina Press, 1998.
- Banksters, Bosses and Smart Money. Ohio State University Press, 2005.
- Race Relations in the United States, 1980-2000. Greenwood Press, 2008.
- The Trial of the Haymarket Anarchists: Terrorism and Justice in the Gilded Age. Palgrave Macmillan, 2011.
- The Haymarket Conspiracy: Transatlantic Anarchist Networks. University of Illinois Press, 2012.
- The Patriots' Dilemma: White Abolitionism and Black Banishment in the Founding of the United States of America, 2024
