= The Haymarket Tragedy =

1984 history book by Paul Avrich

- First edition
- Author: Paul Avrich
- Subject: American history, anarchism
- Published: 1984 (Princeton University Press)
- Pages: 535
- ISBN: 9780691047119

The Haymarket Tragedy is a 1984 history book by Paul Avrich about the Haymarket affair and the resulting trial.

Among other books about the Haymarket affair, The New York Times wrote in 2006, Avrich's book compared as "a tour de force of archival research, clear narrative and probing analysis," especially on the history of American anarchism.
