= Albert Parsons =

American socialist and anarchist newspaper editor

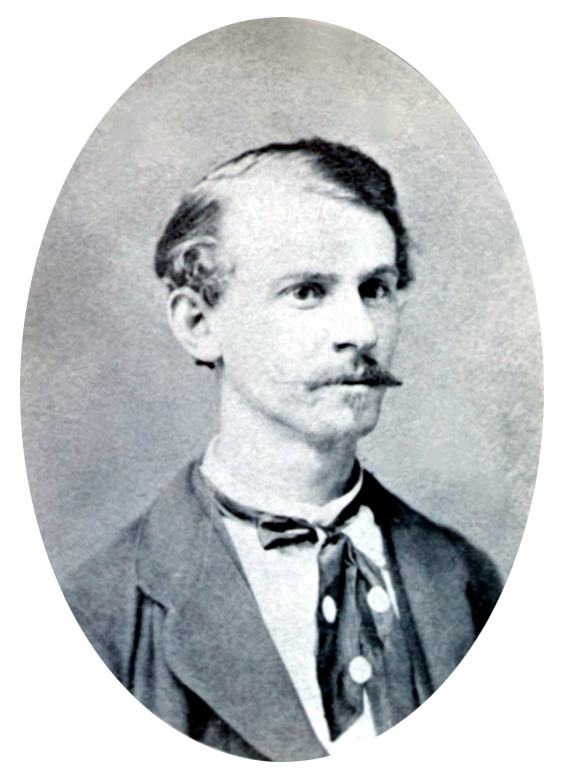
- Born: Albert Richard Parsons; June 20, 1848; Montgomery, Alabama, U.S.
- Died: November 11, 1887 (aged 39); Cook County Jail, Chicago, Illinois, U.S.
- Cause of death: Execution by hanging
- Occupation: Printer
- Political party: Republican (before 1875); Socialist Labor (1877–1887)
- Spouse: Lucy Parsons
- Conviction: Conspiracy to commit murder
- Penalty: Death
- Military career
- Allegiance: Confederate States of America
- Branch: Confederate States Army
- Service years: 1861–1865
- Units: "Lone Star Greys" (irregular); 12th Texas Cavalry Regiment

Albert Richard Parsons (June 20, 1848 – November 11, 1887) was an American left-wing newspaper editor, orator, and labor activist. As a teenager, he served in the military force of the Confederate States of America in Texas, during the American Civil War. After the war, he became an activist for the rights of former slaves, and later a Republican official during Reconstruction. With his wife Lucy Parsons, he then moved to Chicago in 1873 and worked in newspapers. There he became interested in the rights of workers. In 1884, he began editing The Alarm newspaper. In 1887, Parsons was one of four Chicago radical leaders controversially convicted of conspiracy and hanged following a bomb attack on police remembered as the Haymarket affair.

== Early years ==
Parsons was born June 20, 1848 in Montgomery, Alabama. He was one of the ten children of the proprietor of a shoe and leather factory who had originally hailed from Maine.

Parsons described his ancestors as early English settlers, with the first Parsons family arriving at Narragansett Bay in what is now the state of Rhode Island in 1632. One of the Tompkins on his mother's side was with George Washington in the American Revolution and fought at the Battle of Brandywine. He was also a descendant of Major General Samuel Holden Parsons of Massachusetts, another officer in the Revolution, as well as a Captain Parsons who received wounds at the Battle of Bunker Hill.

His parents both died when he was a small child, leaving the boy to be raised by his eldest brother, William Henry Parsons, who was married and the proprietor of a small newspaper in Tyler, Texas, the Tyler Telegraph. In the middle of the 1850s, the family moved from Tyler to Johnson County, living on the frontier for three years. Thereafter, they moved again to the Texas Hill Country, establishing a farm in the valley of the Brazos River.

In 1859, at the age of 11, Parsons left his brother's household to live with a sister in Waco, Texas. Parsons attended school for about a year before leaving to become an apprentice at the Galveston Daily News, a relationship that Parsons characterized as being "indentured" for seven years in order to learn the printers' trade.

== Civil War and Reconstruction ==
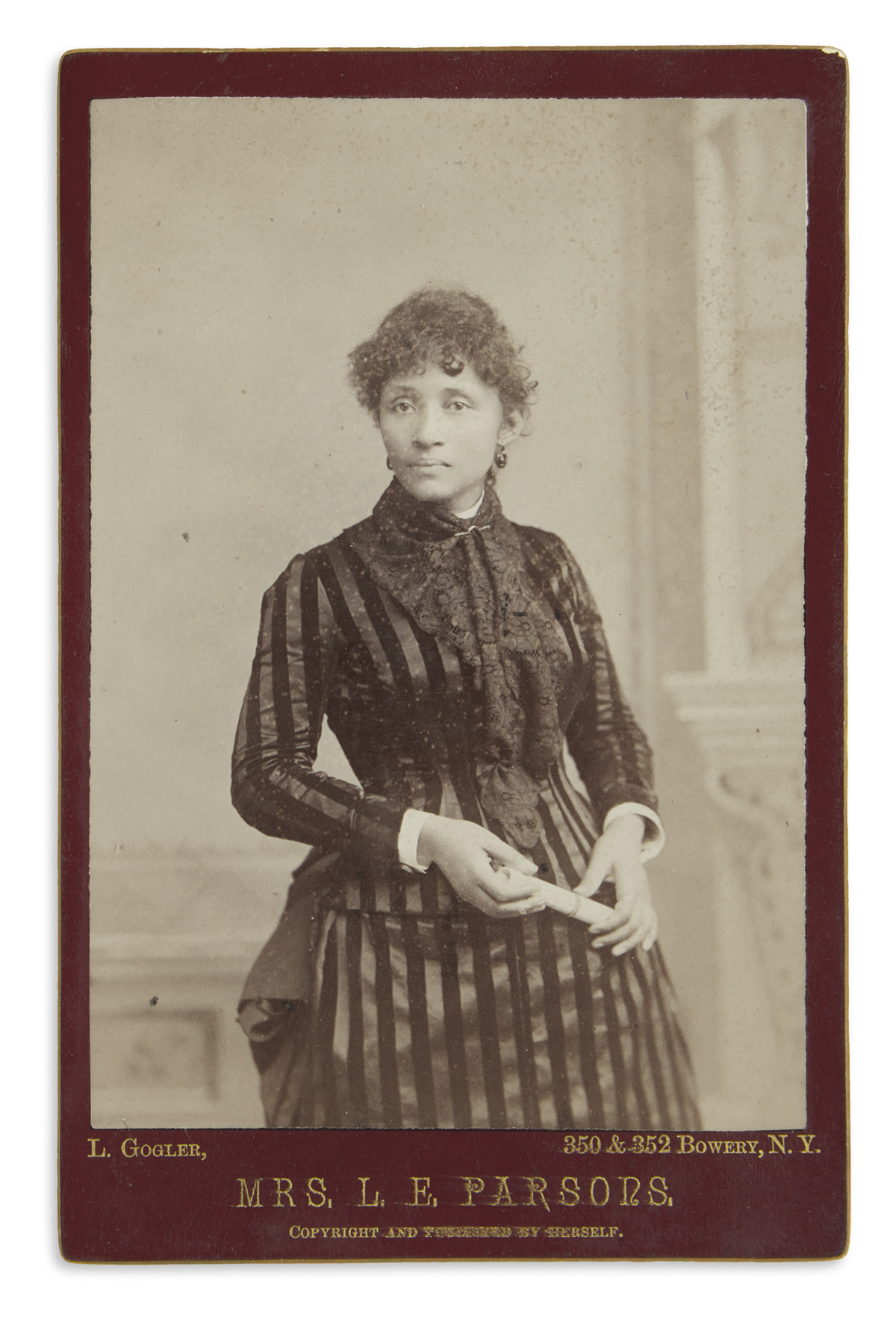
Lucy Parsons, as she appeared in 1886.

The coming of the American Civil War in 1861, or "the slave-holders' Rebellion," as he later called it, led Parsons to leave his job as a "printer's devil" or newsboy. At 13, Parsons volunteered to fight for the Confederate States of America in an irregular unit known as the "Lone Star Greys." Parsons' first military exploit was aboard the passenger steamer Morgan, which ventured into the Gulf of Mexico to intercept and capture the forces of General David E. Twiggs, who had evacuated Texas en route to Washington, D.C.

Upon his return, Parsons sought to enlist in the regular Confederate States Army, an idea ridiculed by his employer and guardian at the time, publisher Willard Richardson of the Galveston Daily News. Parsons left his job at the paper, joining an artillery company at a hastily constructed fort at Sabine Pass, Texas, where an elder brother was the captain of an infantry company. For a year, Parsons participated in military drill and served as a "powder monkey" for the cannoneers. Upon the expiration of his first enlistment, Parsons left Fort Sabine to join the cavalry unit of the brother who had previously brought him to Texas, the 12th Regiment of Texas Cavalry, also known as "Parsons' Mounted Volunteers." Albert Parsons was a member of the "McInoly Scouts" and saw battle during three separate campaigns.

After the war, Parsons returned to Waco, Texas and traded his mule for 40 acres (160,000 m^{2}) of standing corn. He hired ex-slaves to help with the harvest and netted enough money from the sale of the crop to pay for six months' tuition at Waco University, today known as Baylor, a private Baptist college.

After his time in college, Parsons left to take up the printing trade, first working in a printing office before launching his own newspaper, the Waco Spectator, in 1868. In his paper, Parsons took the unpopular position of accepting the terms of surrender and Reconstruction measures aimed at securing the political rights of former slaves. This proved to be a pivotal moment in the 20-year-old's life, as he later recalled in his memoirs:

I became a Republican, and, of course, had to go into politics. I incurred thereby the hate and contumely of many of my former army comrades, neighbors, and the Ku Klux Klan. My political career was full of excitement and danger. I took the stump to vindicate my convictions. The lately enfranchised slaves over a large section of country came to know and idolize me as their friend and defender, while on the other hand I was regarded as a political heretic and traitor by many of my former associates.

In 1869, having left the printing trade, Parsons got a job as a traveling correspondent and business agent for the Houston Daily Telegraph, during which time he met Lucy Ella Gonzales (or Waller), a woman of multi-ethnic heritage. The pair married in 1872 and Lucy Parsons later became famous in her own right as a radical political activist.

In 1870, Parsons was the beneficiary of Republican political patronage when he was appointed Assistant Assessor of United States Internal Revenue under the administration of Ulysses S. Grant. He also worked as a secretary of the Texas State Senate before being appointed Chief Deputy Collector of United States Internal Revenue at Austin, Texas, a position which he held until 1873.

In the summer of 1873, Parsons travelled extensively through the Midwestern United States as a representative of the Texas Agriculturalist, getting a broader view of the country, deciding to settle with his wife in Chicago. With his move to the metropolis, a new chapter of Parsons' life was begun.

== Chicago years ==
=== Socialist period (1874–1879) ===
Steel engraving of Albert R. Parsons used as a frontis piece for his 1889 memoir.

Upon arriving in Chicago, Parsons was hired as a typesetter for the Chicago Times.

In 1874, Parsons became interested in the labor politics as a byproduct of grassroot efforts to force the Chicago Relief and Aid Society to account for millions of dollars of relief aid raised by the group on behalf of victims of the Great Chicago Fire of October 1871. Commercial newspapers came to the aid of the Relief and Aid Society, denouncing its working-class critics as, among other things, "Communists" — a term given new currency after the rise and fall of the Paris Commune during the first half of 1871 — prompting Parsons to begin to study the essence of the charges. Parsons later recalled that this study had convinced him that "the complaints of the working people against the society were just and proper" and led him to draw parallels between the treatment of poor people in both the urban North and the Reconstruction South. "It satisfied me there was a great fundamental wrong at work in society and in existing social and industrial arrangements," he later declared.

In 1875, Parsons left the Republican Party and joined the ephemeral Social-Democratic Party of North America (SDP). Parsons attended the 2nd Convention of the SDP, held in Philadelphia from July 4–6, 1875, and was one of the group's leading English-speaking members in Chicago, joined by another able speaker, George A. Schilling.

As an interested observer, Parsons attended the final convention of the National Labor Union (NLU), held in Pittsburgh in April 1876. At this convention the dying NLU divided, with its radical wing exiting to establish the Workingmen's Party of the United States — a group that soon merged with the SDP to which Parsons belonged. This organization later renamed itself the Socialist Labor Party of America at its December 1877 convention in Newark, New Jersey, which Parsons attended as a delegate. Parsons was also elected as one of two Chicago delegates to the organization's 2nd national Convention, held in Allegheny City, Pennsylvania, at the end of 1879.

Parsons was also involved with the Knights of Labor during its embryonic period. He joined the Knights of Labor, known then as "The Noble and Holy Order of the Knights of Labor," on July 4, 1876, after having been invited to speak at a mass meeting of workers. Parsons remained a member of the order until his death more than a decade later. Not long after joining the Knights of Labor, Parsons and his friend George Schilling co-founded the first Chicago order of the Knights, later dubbed the "Old 400".

In the fall of 1876, Parsons was nominated for Chicago City Alderman by the Workingmen's Party of the United States. He received an impressive one-sixth share of the vote.

In the spring of 1877, the Workingmen's Party ran a full slate of candidates in Cook County, including Chicago. The organization elected three of its members to the Illinois State Legislature and one to the Illinois State Senate. In this election, Parsons ran for County Clerk of Cook County, narrowly losing but polling nearly 8,000 votes. In the course of his life, Parsons ran three times for Chicago City Alderman, twice for Cook County Clerk, and once for United States Congress.

Parsons was one of the foremost speakers in the English language on behalf of the socialist cause in Chicago in the 1870s. In 1877 a Great Railroad Strike took place. On July 21, about a week after the beginning of the strike, Parsons was called upon to address a vast throng of perhaps 30,000 workers congregated at a mass meeting on Chicago's Market Street. Parsons gave a powerful speech to the assembled strikers and their friends on behalf of the Workingmen's Party — an action that cost Parsons his job at the Times the next day.

After being terminated in the morning, Parsons made his way to the offices of the leading German-language socialist newspaper, the Chicagoer Arbeiter-Zeitung (Chicago Workers' News). He was found there and escorted to Chicago City Hall, where he was ushered before the Chief of Police and about 30 of the city's "leading citizens". There Parsons was dressed down for about two hours, with the Chief of Police asking Parsons if he didn't "know better than to come here from Texas and incite the working people to insurrection." Parsons disclaimed any such notion, noting that he had urged the workers not to strike but to go to the polls to elect new representatives. With the agitated worthies present in the room audibly muttering such sentiments as "Hang him" and "Lynch him," the Chief of Police advised Parsons that his life was in danger and urged him to leave town. Parsons was allowed to leave, but he remained in Chicago despite the implied threat on his life.

The afternoon Chicago papers trumpeted that "strike leader" Albert Parsons had been "arrested" that day — neither of which things were true. The Chicago strike of 1877 was ultimately violently repressed by the action of the police and militia.

=== Anarchist period (1880–1887) ===
The front cover motif of Albert R. Parson's posthumously published memoirs featured the slogan of the French Revolution: "Liberty, Equality, Fraternity."

At the turn of the decade, Albert Parsons withdrew from all participation in electoral politics. He later recalled his rationale in his memoirs, written shortly before his execution in 1887:

In 1879 I withdrew from all active participation in the political Labor Party, having been convinced that the number of hours per day that the wage-workers are compelled to work, together with the low wages they received, amounted to their practical disfranchisement as voters. ... My experience in the Labor Party had also taught me that bribery, intimidation, duplicity, corruption, and bulldozing grew out of the conditions which made the working people poor and the idlers rich, and that consequently the ballot-box could not be made an index to record the popular will until the existing debasing, impoverishing, and enslaving industrial conditions were first altered.

Parsons turned his activity to the growing movement to establish the 8-hour day. In January 1880, the Eight-Hour League of Chicago sent Parsons to a national conference in Washington, D.C., a gathering which launched a national lobbying movement aimed at coordinating efforts of labor organizations to win and enforce the 8-hour workday.

In 1881, with the membership of the Socialist Labor Party. in precipitous decline, a new organization was established, the International Revolutionary Socialists. Parsons was a delegate to the founding convention of this group. Two years later he was also a delegate to the October 1883 convention in Pittsburgh which established the anarchist International Working People's Association, the organization to which he owed his political allegiance for the rest of his life.

In the fall of 1884, Parsons launched a weekly anarchist newspaper in Chicago, The Alarm. The first issue was dated October 4, 1884, and was produced in a press run of 15,000 copies. The publication was a 4-page broadsheet with a cover price of 5 cents. The Alarm listed the International Working People's Association as its publisher and touted itself as "A Socialistic Weekly" on its page 2 masthead.

Despite his use of the erstwhile Marxist slogan on the front page, "Workingmen of All Countries, Unite!", Parsons' paper was unmistakably anarchist in content. Parsons wrote on the theme in a November 1884 issue:

The Anarchist believes in peace, but not at the expense of liberty. He believes that all political laws are enacted only to force men to do those things they would not naturally, or if left untrammeled. Therefore he considers all political laws as violations of the laws of nature, and the rights of men.... He believes that all governments tend to more laws, instead of less, and that therefore all governments ultimately become despotisms.

In the early months of 1886, the luck of the workers was rising as massive strikes were beginning to take place, crippling many industries into making concessions. Parsons called for a move to "Eight hours' work for ten hours' pay." Workers in some industries were even beginning to get this. As May approached, so did the day designated as the official day to strike for the eight-hour work day.

On May 1, 1886, Parsons, with his wife Lucy and two children, led 80,000 people down Michigan Avenue, in what is regarded as the first-ever May Day Parade, in support of the eight-hour work day. Over the next few days 340,000 laborers joined the strike. Parsons, amidst the May Day Strike, found himself called to Cincinnati, where 300,000 workers had struck that Saturday afternoon. On that Sunday he addressed the rally in Cincinnati of the news from the "storm center" of the strike and participated in a second huge parade, led by 200 members of The Cincinnati Rifle Union, with certainty that victory was at hand.

== Haymarket Affair ==
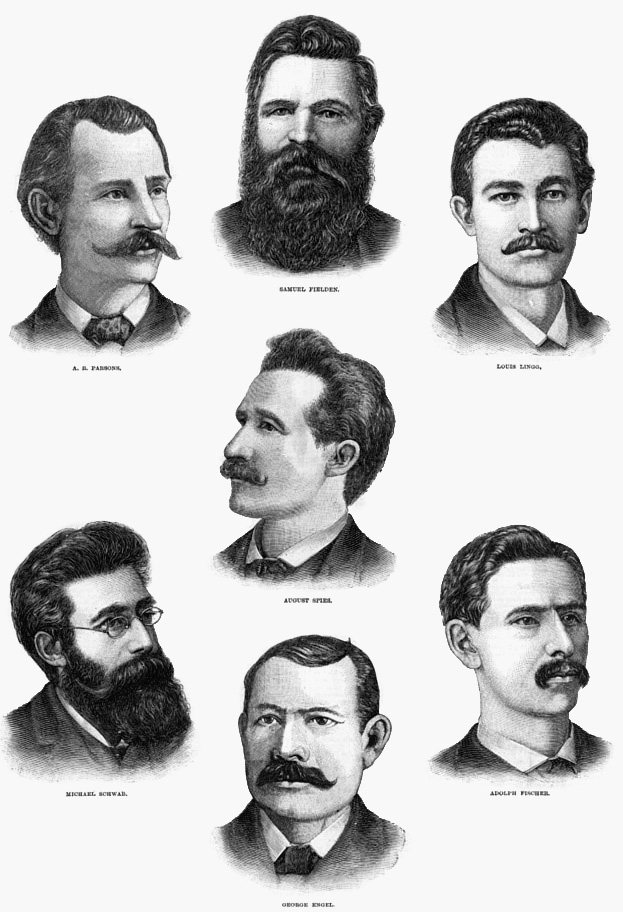
Albert Parsons (top left) and the six other prominent Chicago radicals initially condemned to death for the 1886 Haymarket bombing.

Parsons addressed a rally at Haymarket Square on May 4. This rally was set up in protest of what happened a few days before. On May 1, 1886, the first May Day, a massive strike in support of the eight-hour work day occurred in Chicago. Two days later police fired on workers on strike at the huge McCormick Reaper Works, killing six. August Spies and others organized the rally at the Haymarket in protest of the police violence.

Parsons originally declined to speak at the Haymarket fearing it would cause violence by holding the rally outdoors, but he changed his mind during the rally and eventually showed up while Spies was speaking. The mayor of Chicago was even there and noticed that it was a peaceful gathering, but he left when it looked like it was going to rain. Worried about his children when the weather changed, Albert Parsons, Lizzie Holmes, his wife Lucy, and their children left for Zeph's Hall on Lake Street and were followed by several of the protesters.

The event ended around 10 p.m. and at the end of the event, after Parsons had already left and as the audience was already drifting away, a large group of policemen came and forcefully told the crowd to disperse. At that point a bomb thrown into the square exploded, killing one policeman and wounding others. Gunfire erupted, resulting in 7 deaths and many others wounded.

No one knew who threw the bomb but chaos emerged as police began firing into the crowd. Numerous protestors and policemen died, with most of the police receiving wounds from friendly fire. Parsons was drinking a schooner of beer at Zeph's Hall when he saw a flash and heard the explosion followed by gunfire.

Authorities apprehended seven men in the days after the events in the Haymarket. These men were ones that had connections to the anarchist movement and many people thought them to be promoters of radical ideas, meaning that they could have been involved in a conspiracy. Parsons avoided arrest and moved to Waukesha, Wisconsin, where he remained until June 21; afterward, he turned himself in to stand in solidarity with his comrades.

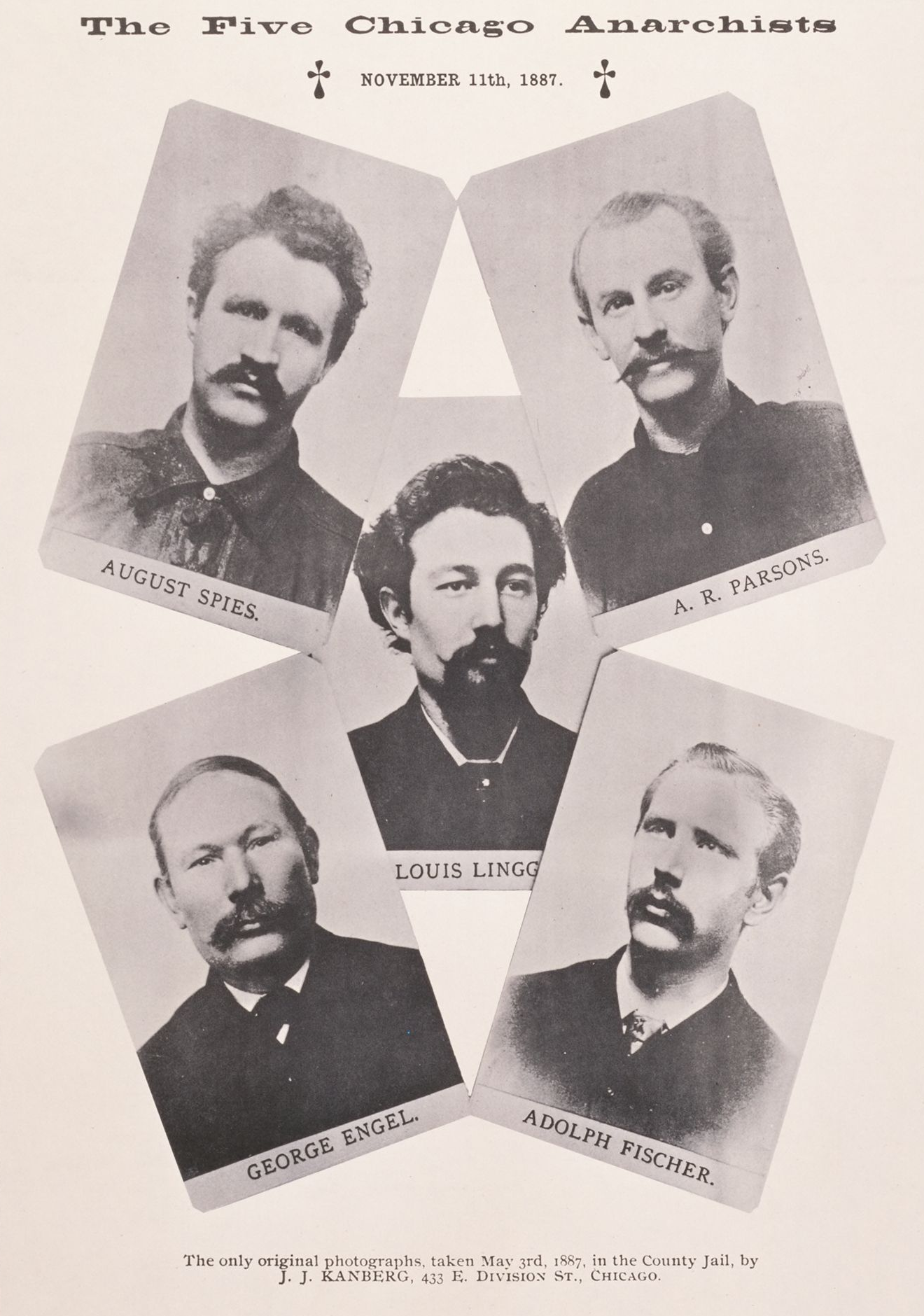
Mug shots of the four anarchists executed–and Louis Lingg, who committed suicide–taken by J. J. Kanberg at the Cook County Jail, May 3, 1887

William Perkins Black, a corporate lawyer, led the defense, despite inevitably becoming ostracized from his peers and losing business for this choice. Witnesses testified that none of the eight threw the bomb. However, all were found guilty, and only Oscar Neebe was sentenced to 15 years in prison, while the rest of them were sentenced to death. Samuel Fielden and Michael Schwab asked for clemency and their sentences were commuted to life in prison on November 10, 1887, by Governor Richard James Oglesby, who lost popularity for this decision. These three men received pardons from Illinois Governor John Peter Altgeld, securing their freedom from incarceration on June 26, 1893.

In the week before his execution, The Alarm was published again for the first time since the Haymarket events, with a page 2 letter by Albert Parsons written from Prison Cell 29 on death row. In his communique, Parsons named Dyer D. Lum as his editorial successor and offered final advice to his supporters:

To other hands are now committed that task which was mine, in the work and duty, as editor of this paper. Though fallen, wounded perhaps unto death, in the battle for liberty, the standard—the press—which my hands bore aloft in the midst of the struggle is caught up by other hands, and will be again and again, if needs, till the crimson banner waves in triumph over the enemies of peace, brotherhood, and happiness.

...

And now to all I say: Falter not. Lay bare the inequities of capitalism; expose the slavery of law; proclaim the tyranny of government; denounce the greed, cruelty, abominations of the privileged class who riot and revel on the labor of their wage-slaves.

— "Farewell."

On November 10, 1887, condemned prisoner Louis Lingg killed himself in his cell with a blasting cap hidden in a cigar. The next day, Parsons, August Spies, Adolph Fischer, and George Engel were executed by hanging.

Parsons likely could have had his sentence commuted to life in prison rather than death, but he refused to write the letter asking the governor to do so, as this would be an admission of guilt.

Parsons' final words on the gallows, recorded for posterity by Dyer D. Lum in The Alarm, were: "Will I be allowed to speak, oh men of America? Let me speak, Sheriff Matson! Let the voice of the people be heard! O—" But the signal was given and Parsons' words were cut short by the springing of the trap-door.

== Family ==
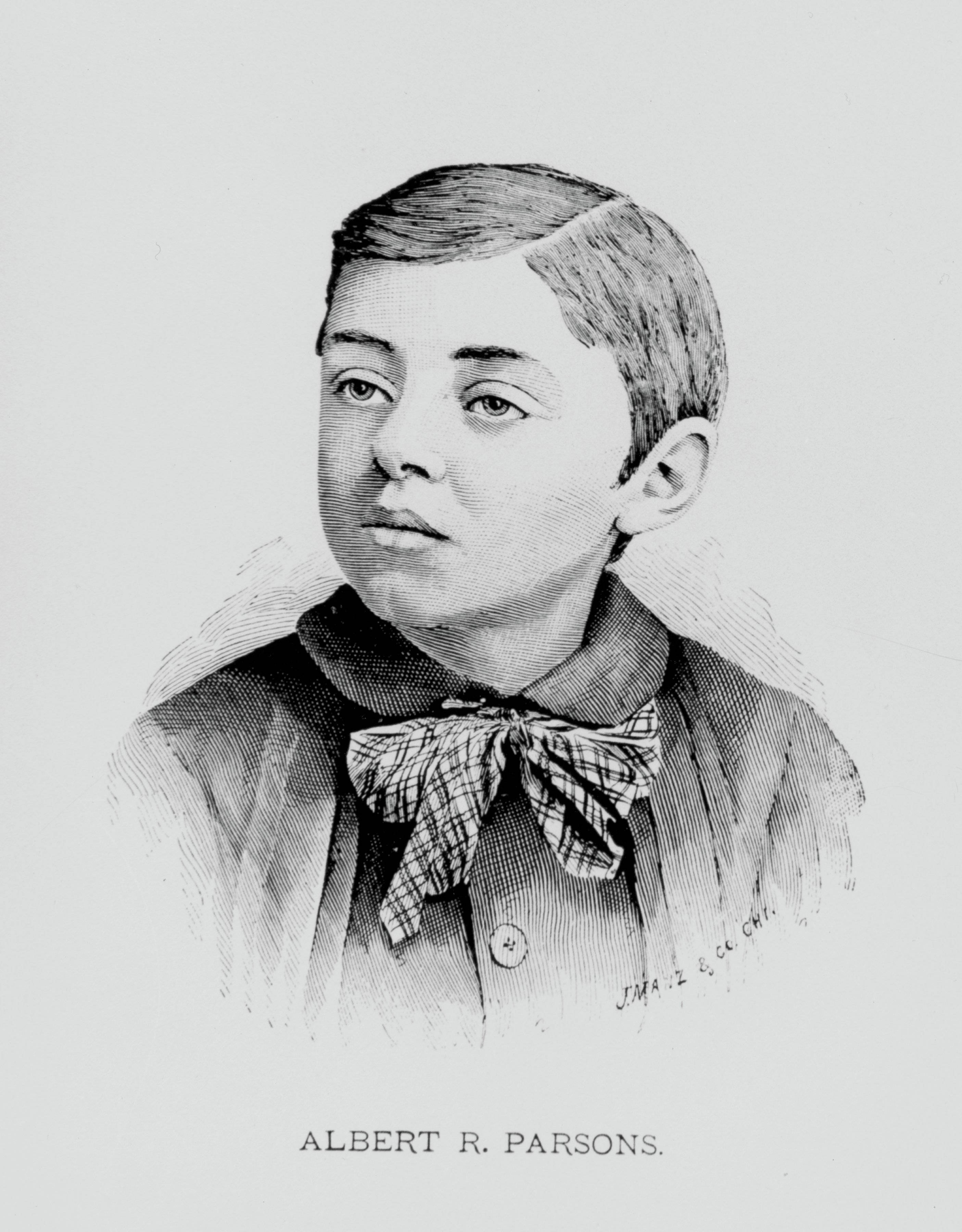
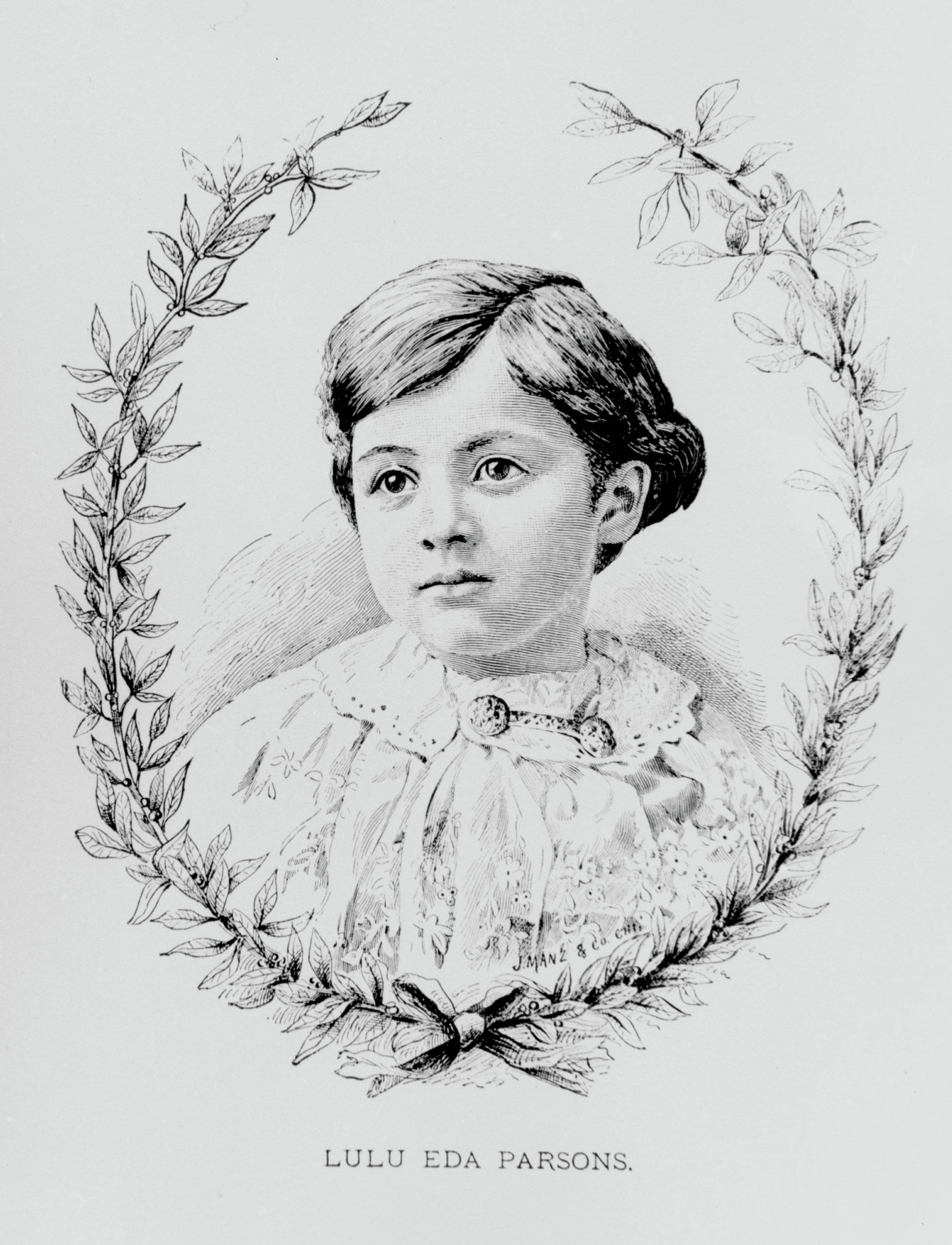
Parsons' children with Lucy:
Albert Richard Parsons Jr. (1879–1919)
and Lulu Eda Parsons (1881–1889)

His wife, Lucy Parsons, was noteworthy in her own right. She was a feminist, journalist, and labor leader, and one of the founders of the Industrial Workers of the World.

== Legacy ==
A historical marker dedicated to Albert and Lucy Parsons was erected in 1997 by the City of Chicago at the location of their home, 1908 North Mohawk Street, in the Old Town neighborhood.

A feature film about Albert and Lucy Parsons and the Haymarket Affair is in development and has an award winning director attached.

== Works ==
- "Equal Rights," The Alarm [Chicago], vol. 1, no. 7 (November 15, 1884), pg. 2.
- The Accused the Accusers: The Famous Speeches of the Chicago Anarchists in Court: On October 7th, 8th, and 9th, 1886, Chicago, Illinois. Chicago: Socialistic Publishing Society, n.d. [1886].
- Anarchism: Its Philosophy and Scientific Basis as Defined by Some of its Apostles. Chicago: Mrs. A.R. Parsons, 1887.
- Life of Albert R. Parsons, with Brief History of the Labor Movement in America. Chicago: Lucy E. Parsons, 1889.

== See also ==
- Haymarket Martyrs' Monument
- Eight-Hour Leagues
