= Louis Lingg =

American anarchist and trade union activist

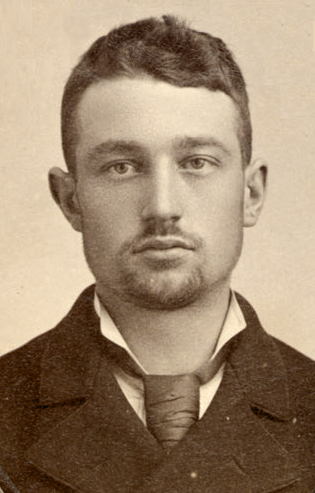
- Born: September 9, 1864; Mannheim, Grand Duchy of Baden
- Died: November 10, 1887 (aged 23); Chicago, Illinois, U.S.
- Cause of death: Suicide by blasting caps in mouth
- Occupation: Carpenter
- Known for: Haymarket Square
- Parent: Friedrich Lingg

Louis Lingg (September 9, 1864 – November 10, 1887) was a German-born American anarchist who was convicted as a member of the criminal conspiracy behind the 1886 Haymarket Square bombing. Lingg was sentenced to die by hanging, but shortly before his execution, he committed suicide in his cell using an explosive.

== Biography ==
=== Early years ===
Louis Lingg was born on September 9, 1864, in Mannheim, in the Grand Duchy of Baden to Friedrich Lingg. His father was injured in the lumber mill where he worked. Louis wrote in his autobiography: "At this time I was thirteen and my sister seven years old, and at this age I received my first impressions of the prevailing unjust social institutions, i.e., the exploitation of men by men."

Lingg became an apprentice carpenter from 1869 to 1882. He then took a job in Strasbourg, in Alsace, then moved on to Freiburg, Germany, where he joined the Working Men's Educational Society, a socialist organization.

To avoid military service, Lingg moved to Switzerland, but in the spring of 1885, the police in Zürich ordered him to leave the country. He then received a letter from his mother telling him that her new husband was willing to provide him with enough money to move to the United States.

=== Haymarket affair ===
In July 1885, Lingg arrived in New York City then departed for Chicago, Illinois, where he joined the International Carpenters and Joiners' Union. He arrived in Chicago seven months before the actions.

On May 4, 1886, Lingg was not present at Haymarket Square for what would be known as the Haymarket Riot. A bomb was thrown into the crowd of policemen by an unidentified person, but prosecutors presented evidence he was involved in making the bomb. Seven men were arrested the next day in connection with the bombing which killed Officer Mathias Degan and other policemen. Lingg himself was discovered in his hiding place on May 14, 1886, when he pulled a revolver and fought with two police officers before being arrested. Lingg and eight other anarchists were charged on June 21, 1886, with criminal conspiracy. Lingg and six others were convicted and sentenced to death.

In Lingg's apartment, police found two spherical bombs and four pipe bombs. Witnesses interviewed by police placed Lingg in the basement of Greif's Hall the night before the bombing, along with other accused members of the conspiracy including Rudolph Schnaubelt, the lead suspect as the bomb thrower who would have stood trial with the other accused had he not fled Chicago. Lingg was placed on trial with seven anarchist associates, who were tried as a group.

Defense attorney Moses Salomon said in his opening statement to the jury: "It may seem strange why he (Lingg) was manufacturing bombs. The answer to that is, he had a right to have his house full of dynamite." Salomon argued that the accused plans did not target "the life of any single individual at any time or place," and did not conspire to murder Officer Mathias Degan or any number of policemen, "except in self-defense."

Salomon also conceded a pivotal point in explaining that his clients did conspire together to use force, their intentions being "that when a general revolution or a general strike was inaugurated, when they were attacked, that then, in fact, while carrying out the purposes of that strike or revolution, that then they should use dynamite, and not until then." Ineptly, defense attorneys did not plead for manslaughter, though as an anarchist who did not recognize the court's authority, the defense's approach was probably of little concern to Lingg.

Gustave Lehman, a fellow anarchist carpenter, testified that Lingg was a member of a militant "armed wing" of his carpenters union. Lehman was stationed outside Greif's Hall as a lookout and recalled walking home with Lingg, William Seliger and two other men. When they asked what was going on, Lingg said, "You are all oxen — fools." Chemists testified that the bombs found in Lingg's apartment shared a unique chemical mixture to shrapnel from the Haymarket bomb.

Seliger, a revolutionary carpenter who subletted a room to Lingg, provided the most damning testimony against him. Seliger had been charged with the murder of Officer Degan and with conspiracy, riot, and unlawful assembly. The charges were dropped when Seliger turned state's evidence. He told the jury he rose early the morning of the bombing and asked Lingg to remove the bombs from the building. Lingg persuaded Seliger that helping him assemble bombs would allow him to remove them that day. Seliger said at least two other men, Ernst Hubner and Herman Mutzenberg, helped rush the bombs to readiness. The two did not appear in court but made statements to police corroborating Seliger's story. None of them were sure how many bombs they made with Lingg that day, their estimates ranging from 26 to 50.

Lingg allegedly told Seliger he was working too slowly, as they needed the bombs by the afternoon. Seliger quoted Lingg as saying they would be used that evening against "the police when they came to protect the capitalists." He said Lingg anticipated a "disturbance" on the West Side and that he had spotted the word "Ruhe" (quietude) in the anarchist newspaper Arbeiter-Zeitung, the signal for armed groups to assemble.

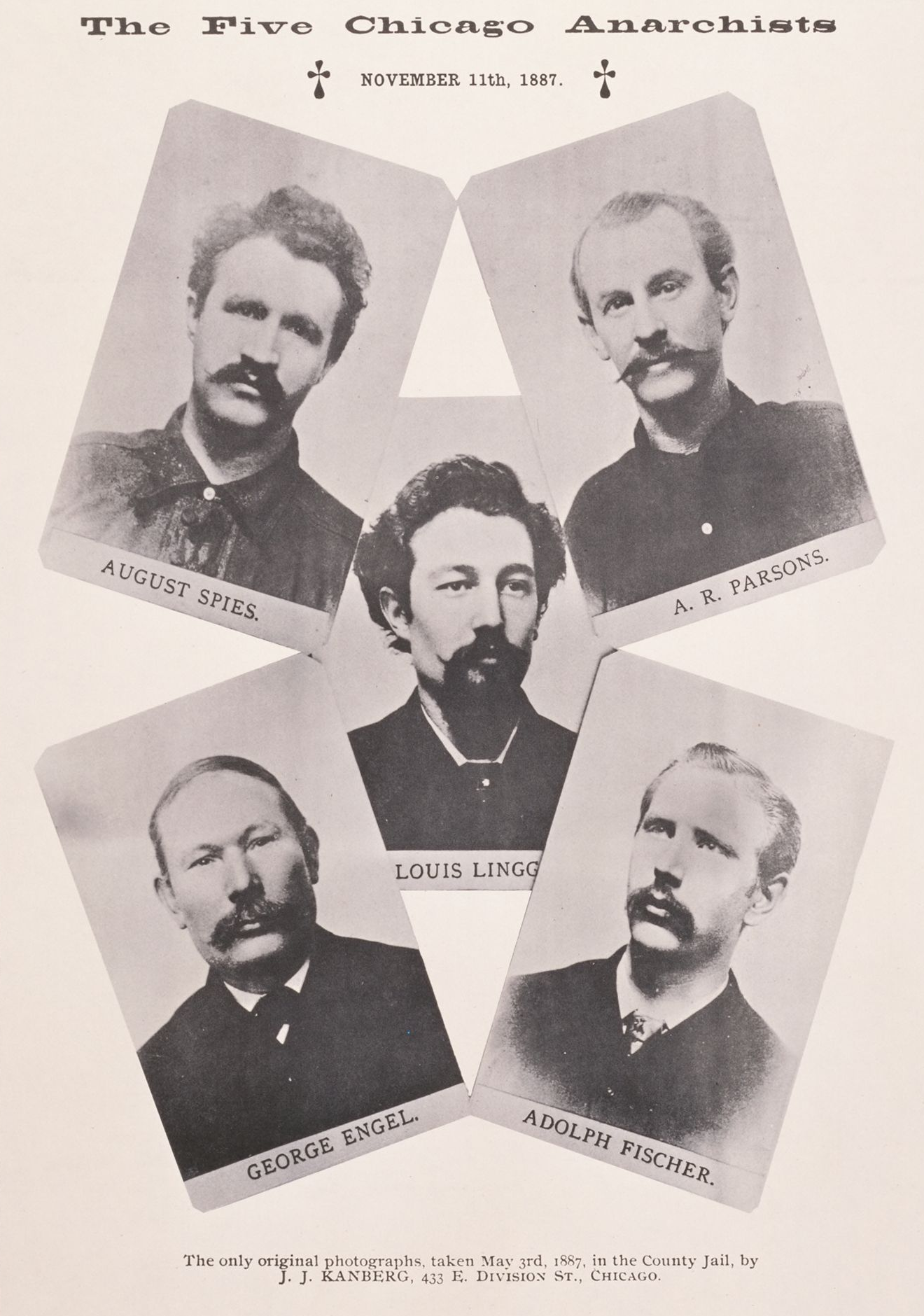
Mug shots of the four anarchists executed–and Lingg, who committed suicide–taken by J. J. Kanberg at the Cook County Jail, May 3, 1887

Seliger testified he helped transport bombs to Neff's Saloon, an anarchist hub, where men helped themselves to the bombs. He then returned to Neff's with Lingg after the bombing. There, a man who came from the Haymarket yelled at Lingg, "You are the fault of all of it," an incident corroborated by the testimony of Moritz Neff, the anarchist bartender.

Under cross-examination Seliger stated that he had been paid by the police on two occasions. He also stated that his wife had also been paid by the police but that he did not know how many times or how much money she received, but on further questioning said "I think twenty or twenty-five dollars." After the trial Seliger and his family were sent to Germany at police expense.

Speaking before the court at his sentencing, Lingg denounced Seliger as a "bought squealer," adding the prosecution had failed to prove that the bombs he made were taken to the Haymarket. He also challenged the link of his bombs to the Haymarket bomb. "A couple of chemists also, have been brought here as specialists, yet they could only state that the metal of which the Haymarket bomb was made bore a certain resemblance to those bombs of mine," saying the prosecution attorney admitted there was a difference of a half inch in the bomb diameters. "I die happy on the gallows, so confident am I that the hundreds and thousands to whom I have spoken will remember my words. When you shall have hanged us, then they will do the bombthrowing! In this hope do I say to you, I despise you, I despise your order, your laws, your force propped authority. Hang me for it."

=== Death and legacy ===
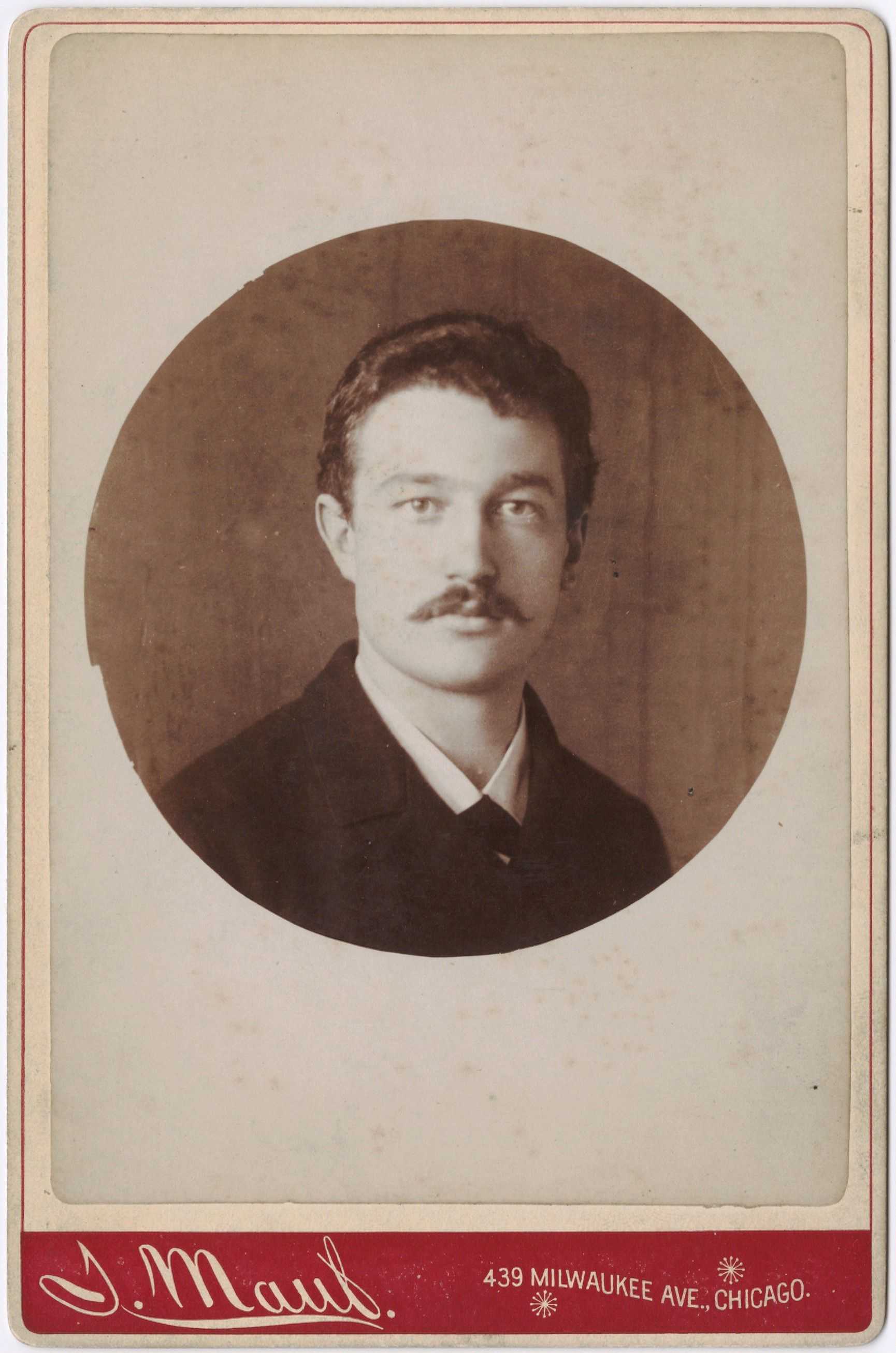
Lingg, undated

On November 6, 1887, four bombs were discovered in Lingg's cell. Lingg died by suicide on November 10, 1887, the day before he was scheduled to hang. He used a blasting cap smuggled to him by a fellow prisoner. He put it in his mouth and lit it at 9:00 am. It blew off his lower jaw and damaged a large portion of his face. He survived for another 6 hours—writing "Hoch die anarchie!" (Hurrah for anarchy!) on the cell stones in his own blood before guards came—until his death at around 3:00 pm.

Lingg was buried, in a plot marked since 1893 by the Haymarket Martyrs Monument, in the Waldheim Cemetery (now Forest Home Cemetery) in Forest Park, Illinois. On June 26, 1893, Illinois governor John Altgeld pardoned three of Lingg's co-defendants - Oscar Neebe, Michael Schwab, and Samuel Fielden - and stated that they were innocent of the crime. In the course of the pardon Altgeld suggested that Lingg and the four executed men were also innocent, but they were not covered by the pardon.

A feature film about the Haymarket Affair is in development.

== See also ==
- Dyer Lum, individualist anarchist and sympathizer who assisted Lingg's suicide
