= Landecker Berg =

Mountain in Hesse, Germany

Coordinates: 50°50′25″N 9°53′20″E

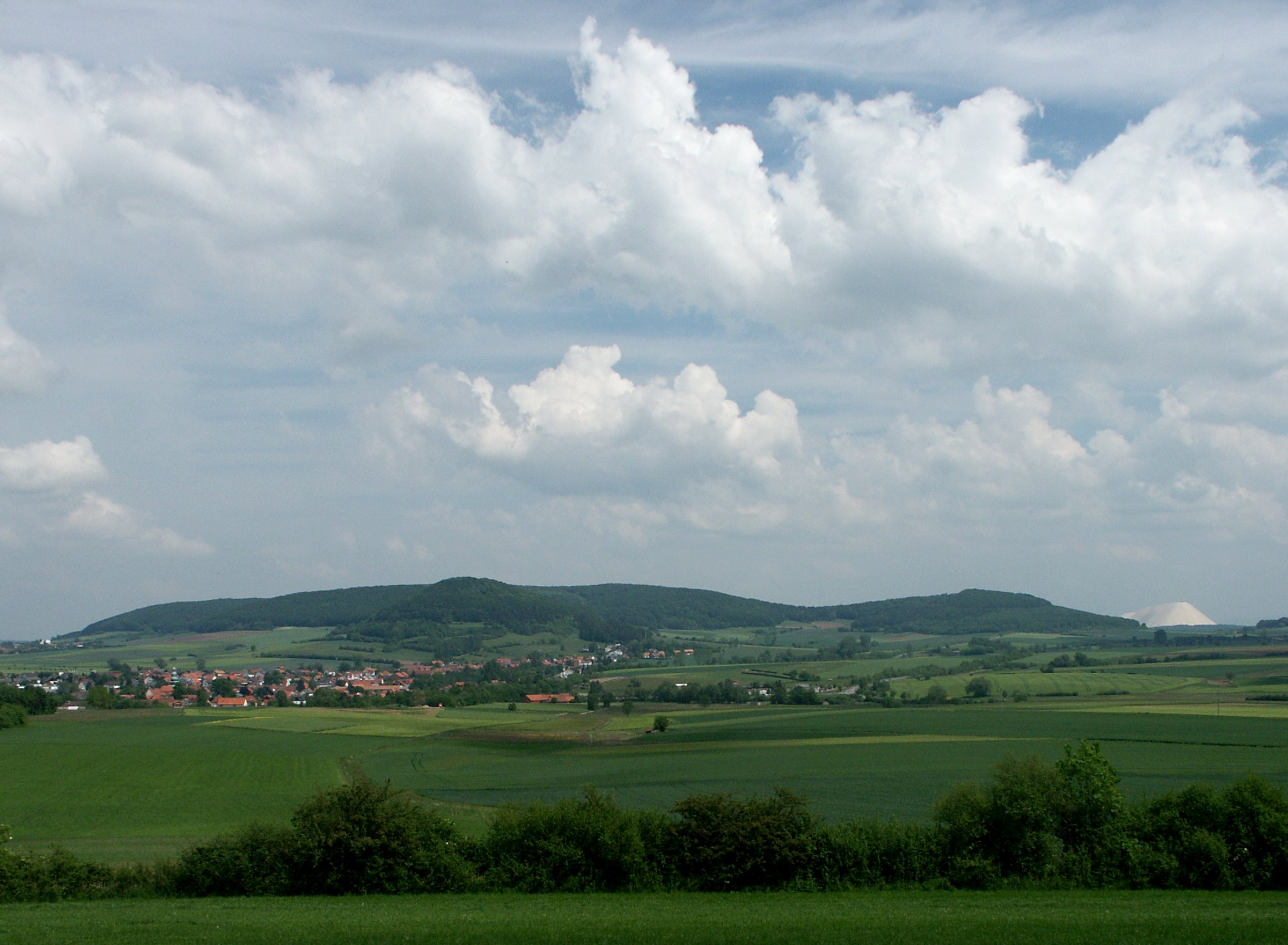
- View of Landecker Berg in Schenklengsfeld in the Rhön mountains

Highest point
- Elevation: 510.9 m (1,676 ft)

Geography
- Location: Hesse, Germany

Landecker Berg is a mountain of Hesse, Germany.

It is the birthplace of the German-American labor activist August Spies, born on December 10, 1855, in a ruined castle converted into a government building on the mountain.
