= Oscar Neebe =

American anarchist (1850–1916)

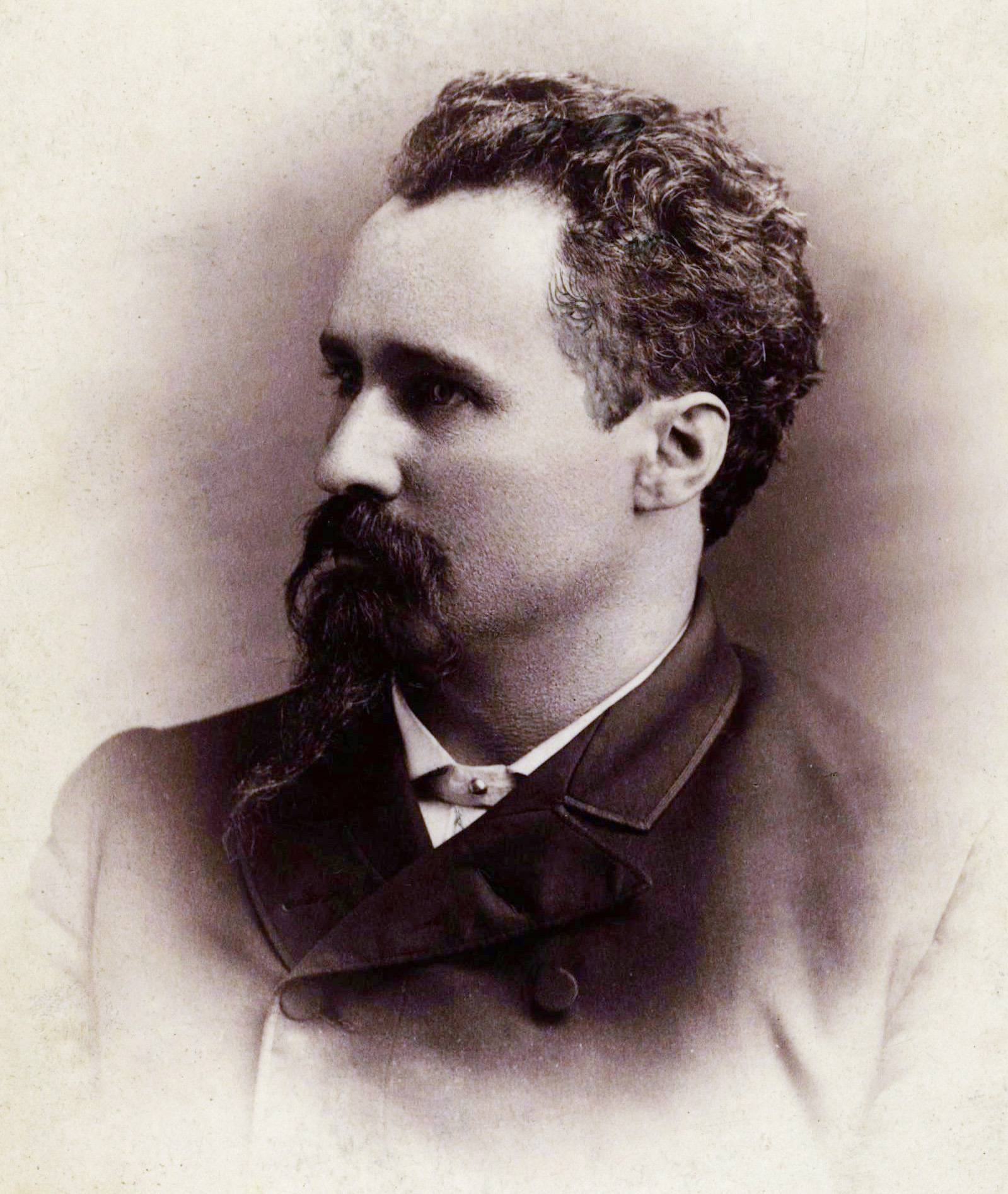
Oscar W. Neebe (1850–1916)

Oscar William Neebe I (July 12, 1850 – April 22, 1916) was an anarchist, labor activist and one of the defendants in the Haymarket bombing trial, and one of the eight activists remembered on May 1, International Workers' Day.

== Early life ==
He was born on July 12, 1850, in New York City to German immigrants of French Huguenot origin from Kassel, Germany. He had two brothers, Conrad Neebe, who moved to Boston and Louis Neebe, who moved to Chicago. The family went back to Hesse so the children could be educated in Germany. They returned to the United States in 1864. Neebe worked for a time manufacturing gold leaf and silver leaf in Brooklyn but quit because of his health.

In 1866, he moved to Chicago, where he had a hard time until he was finally hired as a waiter in a saloon. The saloon was frequented by workers from the nearby McCormick Harvesting Machine Company, and it was here that he learned of the worker's plight and how they were exploited. He also learned of the 8-hour working day movement. In 1868, he started working as a cook on the boats carrying iron ore across the Great Lakes. However, he soon resigned and returned to New York City.

There he became an apprentice tinsmith and later worked making milk cans and oil cans. He lived in tenement housing. In 1871, he heard his first speech by a communist party member.

In 1873 Neebe moved to Philadelphia, where he married Anna M. Monsees. They had three children. In 1877, Oscar moved his family back to Chicago. He worked in a manufacturing plant, but was fired for daring to stand up for his fellow workers. The same year he joined the communist party. Neebe was mostly unemployed during the next two years. In 1881, he and his brother Louis opened a yeast business.

It was on his visits to bakeries and breweries that Neebe became interested in the labor movement. He also became the office manager for the Arbeiter-Zeitung, a German-language anarchist newspaper edited by August Spies and Michael Schwab.

== Haymarket riot and trial ==
Neebe was not present at the Haymarket Square on the day of the meeting and subsequent bombing, and stated that he was not even aware it had happened until he was told about it the following day. When he heard that Spies and Schwab had been arrested in connection with the bombing, he took over management of the Arbeiter-Zeitung. He was himself arrested only a few days later because of his association with the defendants and the Arbeiter-Zeitung.

At trial, the evidence against Neebe was particularly weak, as even the State's Attorney reportedly admitted. The evidence presented against him was based on his political views and that he had attended socialist meetings, was associated with Arbeiter-Zeitung, and that a shotgun, a pistol and red flag were found in his home. One witness claimed that he had been seen distributing the famous "Revenge" Circular. Neebe insisted he had only handed him one that he found and hadn't even read it himself. Despite this, Neebe was sentenced to 15 years in prison. In his final address to the court, he declared:

"There is no evidence to show that I was connected with the bomb-throwing, or that I was near it, or anything of that kind. So I am only sorry, your honor—that is, if you can stop it or help it—I will ask you to do it—that is, to hang me, too; for I think it is more honorable to die suddenly than to be killed by inches. I have a family and children; and if they know their father is dead, they will bury him. They can go to the grave, and kneel down by the side of it; but they can't go to the penitentiary and see their father, who was convicted for a crime that he hasn't had anything to do with. That is all I have got to say. Your honor, I am sorry I am not to be hung with the rest of the men."

While serving his sentence, his wife, Meta, died in 1887. He was promised he could attend her funeral, but instead was allowed to view her remains privately at his home. On June 26, 1893, Illinois Governor John Peter Altgeld pardoned Neebe and two of his co-defendants, having concluded that they were innocent.

== Later years ==
Neebe remarried the year he was released. He had three more children with his new wife, Regina Hepp. Neebe, who had been involved with (and then expelled from) the Socialist Labor Party and active in the trade union movement prior to the Haymarket Affair, joined the Industrial Workers of the World soon after its founding in 1905. He was listed as one of their main speakers in Chicago for Labor Day 1906, and attended the union's 1907 Convention. He spent his final years quietly as a saloonkeeper, and died in Chicago on April 22, 1916, at the age of 65.

Neebe was buried at the Haymarket Martyrs' Monument in German Waldheim Cemetery in Forest Park, Illinois.

== See also ==
- List of wrongful convictions in the United States

== Works ==
- Oscar Neebe Autobiography
- The Accused the Accusers: The Famous Speeches of the Chicago Anarchists in Court: On October 7th, 8th, and 9th, 1886, Chicago, Illinois. Chicago: Socialistic Publishing Society, n.d. [1886].
