= Arbeiter-Zeitung (Chicago) =

German-language newspaper

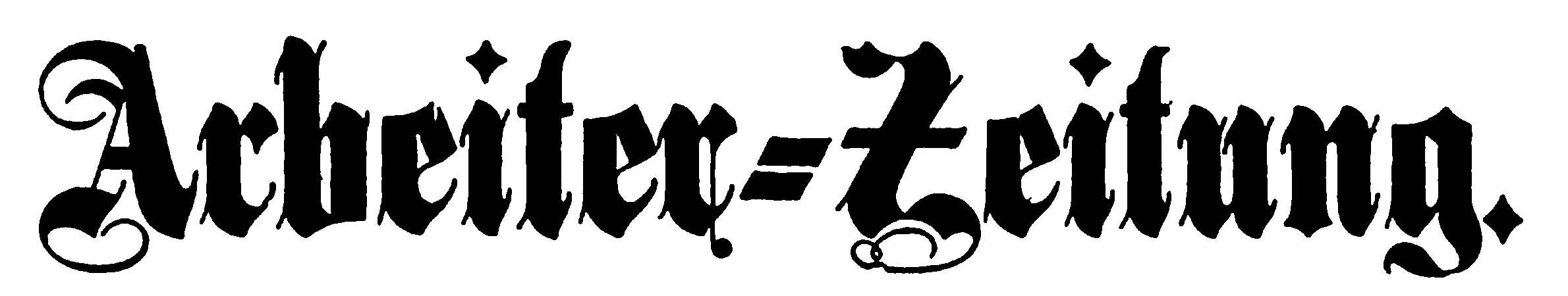

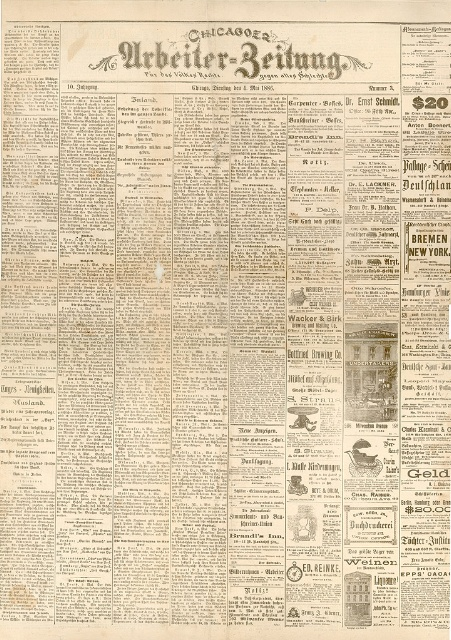
- The masthead for the May 4, 1886, edition of the Arbeiter-Zeitung, presented as evidence in the trial for the Haymarket affair
- Type: Daily German-language newspaper
- Founded: 1877
- Ceased publication: 1931
- Language: German
- Headquarters: Chicago
- Circulation: 3,500 (1881)

The Arbeiter-Zeitung, also known as the Chicagoer Arbeiter-Zeitung, was a German-language, radical newspaper started in Chicago, Illinois, in 1877 by veterans of the Great Railroad Strike of 1877. It continued publishing through 1931. It was the first working-class newspaper in Chicago to last for a significant period, and sustained itself primarily through reader funding. The reader-owners removed several editors over its run due to disagreements over editorial policies.

The Arbeiter-Zeitung was initially edited by German-American émigrés Paul Grottkau and August Spies. Grottkau travelled to Milwaukee, Wisconsin, in 1886 and changed the name of the local socialist weekly, then called Arminia, to the Milwaukee Arbeiter Zeitung. The paper was also made a tri-weekly. Influential American socialist Victor Berger became editor of the Milwaukee Arbeiter Zeitung in 1893 and changed the paper to the daily Wisconsin Worwaerts. The Chicago paper was left in the hands of Spies, who was officially named editor in 1884.

In the early months of 1886, membership in Chicago Internationals (militant unions) swelled to record levels while the Arbeiter-Zeitung and the anarchist publication The Alarm (edited by the Parsons) unleashed a steady stream of editorials railing against capitalism. Labor leaders focused on the eight-hour work day as the means to a better life for working people. The newspaper complained that as wealthy businessmen lived opulently, workers suffered, and unemployment rose. Even in companies where profits rose sharply, employers cut wages. Strikes became more common—and some led to violence.

As a result of the Haymarket Square bombing of May 4, 1886, police arrested and investigated staff members of the Arbeiter-Zeitung. Its offices were raided, and speeches and writings published in the paper were part of the evidence used to convict and hang the anarchists who were arrested in its wake. Its editor, August Spies, and a typesetter, Adolph Fischer, were executed after a widely publicized, six-week trial; business manager Oscar Neebe and chief editorial assistant Michael Schwab were sentenced to death, but later pardoned.

Prosecutors showed that, the night before the bombing, Fischer had proposed that the paper should publish the word ruhe ('peace')—a call for armed men to assemble. The word did appear, highlighted in the May 4 edition. A staff member testified ruhe was written in the hand of Spies.

At his sentencing, Spies denounced the police and prosecution witnesses. He also charged that one witness, Gustav Legner, could prove his alibi but was threatened by police and paid to leave Chicago. Legner later sued the Arbeiter-Zeitung for libel for repeating Spies' claim of bribery, denying he was told to leave town. Legner said he asked Spies before leaving the city if he should testify and was told he would not be needed. The Arbeiter-Zeitung agreed to print a retraction.

In the early 1900s Hippolyte Havel, a Czech anarchist from Austria-Hungary edited the newspaper. He had met Emma Goldman in London and returned with her from Europe. In Chicago, he lived in her household shared with Mary and Abe Isaak for a while. He later moved to New York, where he continued to edit anarchist papers.

The Sunday edition of the paper, Die Fäckel, was published from 1879 until 1924.

The library of the University of Cincinnati has several years' holdings of the Arbeiter-Zeitung on microfilm in its German-Americana Collection.

== See also ==
- German language newspapers in the United States
- Arbeiter-Zeitung (Vienna)
- Sozialistische Arbeiter-Zeitung
