= Forest Home Cemetery (Forest Park) =

Cemetery in Forest Park, Illinois, US

Coordinates: 41.8698°N 87.8198°W

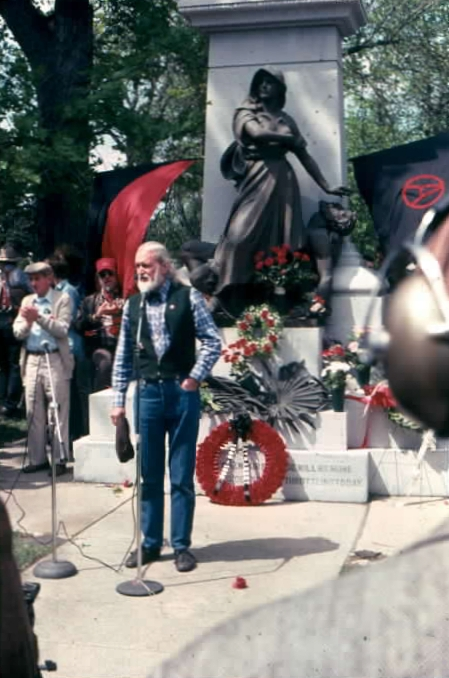
Ceremony at the Haymarket Martyrs' Monument in Forest Home Cemetery, Forest Park, Illinois, in May 1986, in which singer Utah Philips and others commemorated the 100th anniversary of the Haymarket Affair

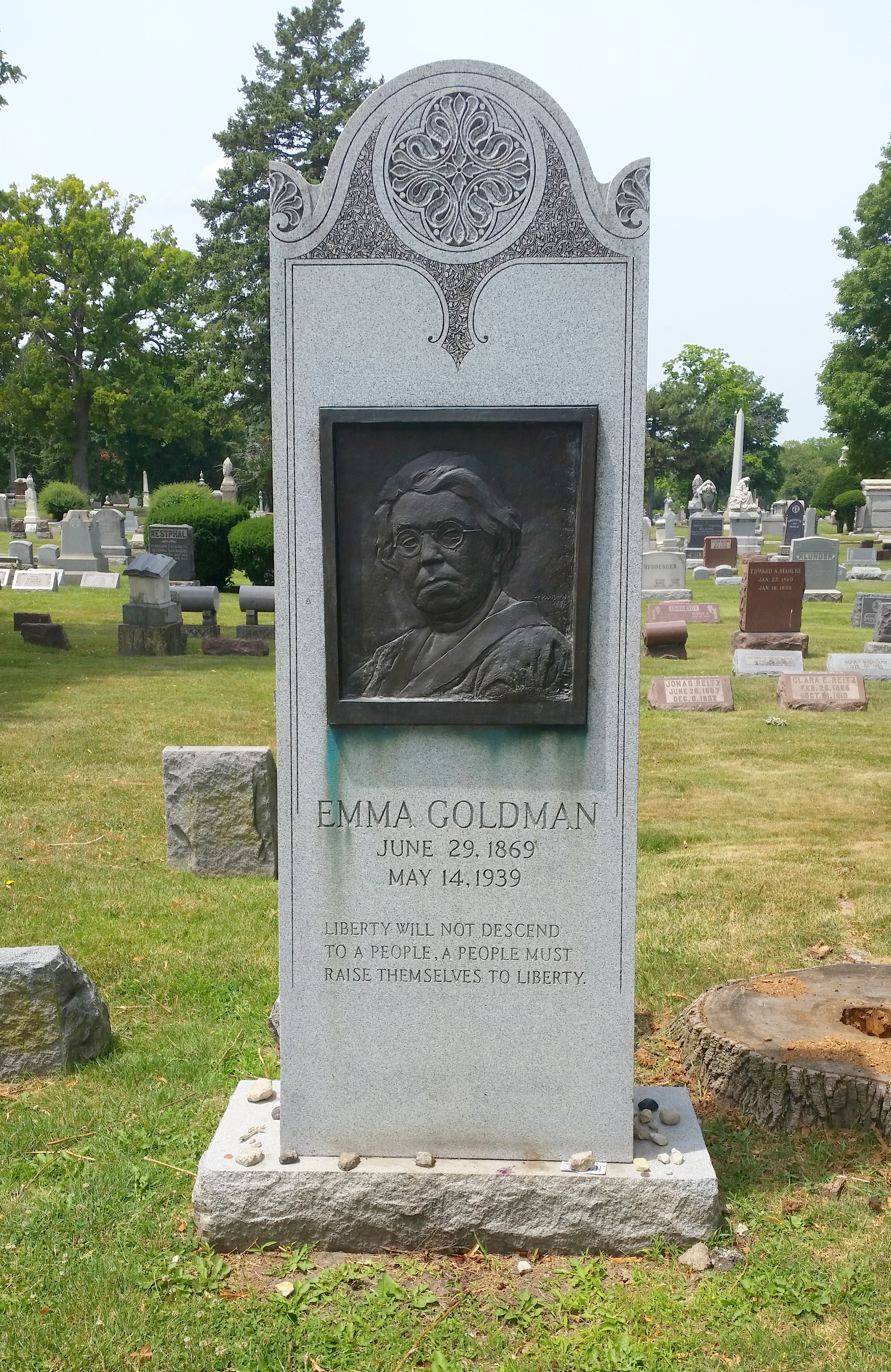
Emma Goldman's grave. Jo Davidson was the sculptor of the bronze bas relief image of Goldman. (The dates of birth and death on the stone are incorrect.)

Forest Home Cemetery is a cemetery located at 863 S. Des Plaines Ave, Forest Park, Illinois, United States. Located adjacent to the Eisenhower Expressway, it straddles the Des Plaines River in Cook County, just west of Chicago. The cemetery traces its history to two adjacent cemeteries, German Waldheim (1873) and Forest Home (1876), which merged in 1969.

The cemetery includes two listings on the National Register of Historic Places. The Haymarket Martyrs' Monument was named a National Historic Landmark in 1997. The gravesite of Joseph Carter Corbin, a pioneer in Black education and founder of the University of Arkansas at Pine Bluff, was added to the National Register in 2023.

== History ==
Forest Home Cemetery was the site of a Potawatomi village and burial ground until 1835. Two memorials at Forest Home are dedicated to Native Americans who lived in the region prior to white settlement.

Ferdinand Haase, founder of Forest Park, and other members of the Haase family are buried on what at one time also was a Haase family homestead. The cemetery was formally established and incorporated under the laws of the State of Illinois in 1876.

The German Waldheim Cemetery was organized by a group of German Masonic Lodges in 1873 with the first interment on May 9, 1873. The Waldheim Cemetery was established as a non-religion-specific cemetery, where Freemasons, Romani, and German-speaking immigrants to Chicago could be buried without regard for religious affiliation.

The two adjacent cemeteries merged on February 28, 1969, with the combined cemetery being called Forest Home (Waldheim means "forest home" in German). Jewish Waldheim Cemetery, located across Roosevelt Road, is a separate cemetery and is not affiliated with Forest Home.

== Haymarket Memorial ==
The "Haymarket martyrs," as the five defendants sentenced to death in the Haymarket affair came to be called among their sympathizers, were buried at Waldheim because since its establishment, it had a policy of not discriminating on the basis of race, ethnicity, or politics, in addition to being open to any religion. It was also the only Chicago-area cemetery that would accept their remains. After their burial, the cemetery became a place of pilgrimage for anarchists, leftists, and union members. In 1893, the Haymarket Martyrs' Monument, designed by sculptor Albert Weinert, was erected.

In homage to the Haymarket martyrs, other anarchists and socialists later chose to be buried at Waldheim, well into the 20th century, including:

- Slim Brundage
- Voltairine de Cleyre
- Eugene Dennis
- Joseph Dietzgen
- Raya Dunayevskaya
- Elizabeth Gurley Flynn
- William Z. Foster
- Emma Goldman
- Gus Hall
- Ammon Hennacy
- Lucy Parsons
- Ben Reitman
- Franklin Rosemont
- Boris Yelensky

== Other notable interments ==
The cemetery also includes the graves of:

- Harry Aleman (mobster, murderer)
- Billy Sunday (evangelist, prohibitionist, baseball player)
- Doris Humphrey (modern dance pioneer)
- Paul Harvey, (radio announcer)
- Belle Gunness (serial killer)
- Parents and grandparents of author Ernest Hemingway
- Joseph Carter Corbin (educator and founder of the University of Arkansas at Pine Bluff) and his wife, Mary Jane Corbin and sons, John Ward Corbin and William H. Corbin.
- Edward Uihlein (vice president of Schlitz Brewing Company, philanthropist)
- Bob Wicker (baseball player)
- Victims of the Iroquois Theatre Fire (1903)
- Victims of the Eastland Disaster (1915)

The cemetery is home to two memorials to Chicago-area Grand Army of the Republic posts. The memorial of Phil Sheridan Post 615, based in Oak Park, Illinois, is atop the gravesite of one of its former presidents, Wilbur Fisk Crummer. Chicago-based Columbia Post 706 has its memorial in the cemetery west of the Des Plaines River.

== See also ==
- Burials at Forest Home Cemetery (category)
- List of cemeteries in Cook County, Illinois
- Chicago Helicopter Airways Flight 698 crashed at the cemetery in 1960
