= Michael Schwab =

American anarchist (1853–1898)

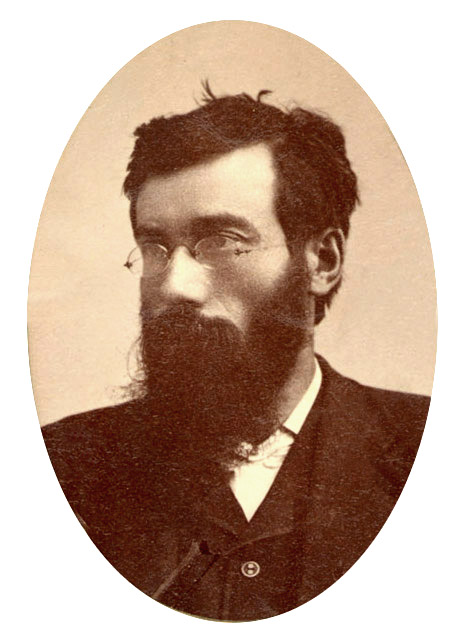
Michael Schwab, sentenced to death

Michael Schwab (August 9, 1853 – June 29, 1898) was a German-American labor organizer and one of the defendants in the Haymarket Square incident.

During his last years Schwab abandoned anarchist doctrine and embraced international socialism, speaking and writing in opposition to the notion of revolution by force.

Schwab had intestinal and pulmonary issues during his last years, for which he was hospitalized at the Alexian Brothers' Hospital in Chicago in November 1897. He remained there for the last seven months of his life, undergoing an operation in the middle of May 1898. Schwab died from his chronic internal ailment on June 29, 1898. The Social Turnverein of Chicago arranged his funeral and announced plans for his immediate cremation. He was cremated on July 6 and his widow received his ashes.

Schwab was married to the sister of Rudolph Schnaubelt (1863–1901), a Chicago anarchist believed by many to have actually thrown the bomb at Haymarket. Together the couple had three children.

== See also ==
- Arbeiter-Zeitung (Chicago)
