= List of anarchist periodicals =

== Current publications ==
The following is a chronological list of noteworthy anarchist periodicals that are still being published.

Dates of publication	Title	Format	Language	Base
1886–present	Freedom	Journal	English	London (UK)
1888–1919; 1930–1949; 1977–present	Tierra y Libertad	Newspaper	Spanish	Barcelona, Valencia and Madrid (Spain) Mexico City (Mexico)
1898–present	Brand	Magazine	Swedish	Stockholm (Sweden)
1907–present	Solidaridad Obrera	Newspaper	Spanish	Spain
1920–1922; 1945–present	Umanità Nova	Newspaper	Italian	Italy
1954–present	Le Monde Libertaire	Newspaper	French	Paris, France
1965–present	Fifth Estate	Magazine	English	Detroit, Michigan (US)
1969–present	The Match!	Magazine	English	Tucson, Arizona (US)
1970–present	Black Flag	Newspaper	English	United Kingdom
1970–present	Gateavisa	Newspaper	Norwegian	Oslo (Norway)
1972–present	Graswurzelrevolution	Magazine	German	Germany
1980–present	Anarchy: A Journal of Desire Armed	Magazine	English	Berkeley, California, originally Columbia, Missouri (US)
1981–present	Social Anarchism	Journal	English	Baltimore, Maryland (US)
1982–present	Rebel Worker	Magazine	English	Sydney, Australia
1983–present	Class War	Newspaper	English	London (UK)
1985–present	El Libertario	Newspaper	Spanish	Buenos Aires City (Argentina)
1986–present	Anarcho-Syndicalist Review	Magazine	English	United States
1988–present	Organise!	Magazine	English	Great Britain and Ireland
1991-present ?	SCAM	Zine	English	Argentina and United States
1993–present	Anarchist Studies	Magazine	English	London (UK)
1995–present	El Libertario	Newspaper	Spanish	Caracas (Venezuela)
1996–present	Perspectives on Anarchist Theory	Magazine	English	Washington, DC (US)
1998–present	resistance	Journal	English	London (UK)
2021–present	Liberté Ouvrière	Journal	English and French	Montreal, QC (Canada)
2023–present	Anarchist Union Journal	Journal	English	United States and Canada

== Defunct ==
The following is a chronological list of noteworthy anarchist and proto-anarchist periodicals that are now defunct.

Dates of publication	Title	Format	Language	Base
1833	The Peaceful Revolutionist	Newspaper	English	Cincinnati, Ohio (US)
1872-1878	Bulletin de la Fédération jurassienne	Newspaper	French	Sonvilier, Le Locle, and later La Chaux-de-Fonds (CH)
1872–1890; 1892–1893	The Word	Magazine	English	Princeton, Cambridge (US)
1877-1878	L'Avant-Garde	Newspaper	French	La Chaux-de-Fonds (CH)
1877-1878	Le Travailleur	Newspaper	French	Geneva (CH)
1879–1910	Freiheit	Newspaper	German	London (UK), New York City (US)
1879–1885	Le Révolté	Newspaper	French	Geneva (Switzerland)
1881–1896	La Tramontana	Newspaper	Catalan	Barcelona (Spain)
1881–1908	Liberty	Newspaper	English	Boston, Massachusetts (US)
1882	Le Droit social	Newspaper	French	Lyon, Rhône (FR) (first period of the Lyon anarchist press)
1882	L'Étendard révolutionnaire	Newspaper	French	Lyon, Rhône (FR) (first period of the Lyon anarchist press)
1883–1907	Lucifer the Lightbearer	Newspaper	English	Valley Falls, Kansas and Chicago, Illinois (US)
1883	La Vengeance anarchiste	Newspaper	French	Paris, Île-de-France (FR)
1883	La Lutte	Newspaper	French	Lyon, Rhône (FR) (first period of the Lyon anarchist press)
1883	Le Drapeau noir	Newspaper	French	Lyon, Rhône (FR) (first period of the Lyon anarchist press)
1883-1884	L'Émeute	Newspaper	French	Lyon, Rhône (FR) (first period of the Lyon anarchist press)
1884	Le Défi	Newspaper	French	Lyon, Rhône (FR) (first period of the Lyon anarchist press)
1884	L'Hydre anarchiste	Newspaper	French	Lyon, Rhône (FR) (first period of the Lyon anarchist press)
1884	L'Alarme	Newspaper	French	Lyon, Rhône (FR) (first period of the Lyon anarchist press)
1884	Le Droit anarchique	Newspaper	French	Lyon, Rhône (FR) (first period of the Lyon anarchist press)
1884–1888?	The Alarm	Newspaper	English	Chicago (US)
1886-1887	La Révolution Cosmopolite	Newspaper	French	Paris, Île-de-France (FR)
1889	Il Pugnale	Newspaper	Italian	Paris, Île-de-France (FR)
1889-1902	Le Père Peinard	Newspaper	French	Paris, Île-de-France (FR)
1890–1977	Fraye Arbeter Shtime	Newspaper	Yiddish	United States
1890–1897; 1903–1908	El Corsario	Journal	Spanish	A Coruña (Spain)
1891	Le Forçat	Newspaper	French	Paris, Île-de-France (FR)
1891–1894	l'Endehors	Newspaper	French	Paris, Île-de-France (FR)
1892–1915; 1920–1923	Arbeter Fraynd	Newspaper	Yiddish	London (UK)
1894–1896	Liberty	Newspaper	English	London (UK)
1895–1897	Le Christ Anarchiste	Newspaper	French	Toulon (FR)
1895–1904	The Firebrand, 1895–1897 Free Society, 1897–1904	Newspaper	English	Portland, Oregon (1995–1997), San Francisco, California (1997–2001), Chicago, Illinois (2001–2004) (US)
1896–1897	La Voz de la Mujer	Newspaper	Spanish	Rosario (Argentina)
1896–1932	Der Eigene	Journal	German	Berlin (Germany)
1897–1899	The Adult	Journal	English	London (UK)
1898–1905; 1923–1936	La Revista Blanca	Magazine	Spanish	Madrid and Barcelona (Spain)
1900–1940; 1947–1950; 1957–1960	Le Réveil anarchiste	Newspaper	French and Italian	Geneva (Switzerland)
1900–1903; 1905–1908	Germinal	Newspaper	Yiddish	London (UK)
1900–??	Regeneración	Newspaper	Spanish	Mexico and United States
1901-1912	La Battaglia	Newspaper	Italian	São Paulo (BRA)
1901-1904; 1909-1916; 1933-1935	A Lanterna	Newspaper	Portuguese	São Paulo (BRA)
1903–1918	Cronaca Sovversiva	Newspaper	Italian	New Jersey (US)
1905–1914	L'Anarchie	Newspaper	French	Paris (FR)
1907–1908	Tianyi bao	Magazine	Chinese	Tokyo (JP)
1907–1910	Xin Shiji (新世纪 = New Era, Nouveau Siècle), periodical of the Chinese students abroad in France	Newspaper	Chinese	Paris (FR)
1906–1917	Mother Earth	Magazine	English	United States
1907–1932	Die Aktion	Newspaper	German	Germany
1908-1915	A Voz do Trabalhador	Newspaper	Portuguese	Rio de Janeiro (BRA)
1911–1923	Bluestockings Journal	Magazine	Japanese	Japan
1911–1919	Golos Truda	Newspaper	Russian	New York City, Petrograd, Moscow
1912–1913; 1913–1916; 1921	Huiminglu (Cock Crow Journal, also titled with Pingminzhisheng, 'Voice of the Common People'); Minsheng (Voice of the People); Minsheng	Magazine	Chinese	Guangzhou, China; Portuguese Macau, later moved to Shanghai International Settlement; Guangzhou, China
1916–1917	The Blast	Magazine	English	San Francisco, California (US)
1917-1921	Der Ziegelbrenner	Magazine	German	Munich and Cologne (Germany)
1917-1951	A Plebe	Newspaper	Portuguese	São Paulo (BRA)
1918	Labor	Magazine	Chinese	Shanghai, China
1919-1925	Der Einzige	Magazine	German	Germany
1922–1939	L'EnDehors	Newspaper	French	Paris (France)
1922–1971	L'Adunata dei refrattari	Magazine	Italian	New York City (US)
1923–1928	De Moker	Magazine	Dutch	Netherlands
1927–1931	Road to Freedom	Newspaper	English	New York City (US)
1929–1937	Iniciales	Magazine	Spanish	Barcelona and Valencia (Spain)
1932–1939	Vanguard	Newspaper	English	New York City, New York (US)
1936–1939	Spain and the World	Newspaper	English	London (UK)
1937–1940	Jingzhe	Newspaper	Chinese	Chengdu
1939–1945	War Commentary	Newspaper	English	London (UK)
1940-1947	Now	Magazine	English	London (UK)
1942–1952	Why? An Anarchist Bulletin and Resistance	Magazine	English	New York City (US)
1945–1956	L'Unique	Journal	French	France
1960–1992	Solidarity	Magazine	English	London (UK)
1961–1970	Anarchy	Magazine	English	London (UK)
1961–1994	Our Generation	Journal	English	Montreal (Canada)
1966–1968	Black Mask	Journal	English	New York City, New York (US)
1975–1980	Libero International	Newspaper	English	Kobe (JP)
1977-1988	O Inimigo do Rei	Newspaper	Portuguese	Bahia state (BRA)
1981–1997	Ideas and Action	Magazine	English	United States
1981–2005	Processed World	Zine	English	San Francisco (US)
1984-2001	Schwarzer Faden	Magazine	German	Germany
1984–???	Green Anarchist	Zine	English	United Kingdom
1985-1991	J.D.s	Zine	English	Canada
1987–2003	The Raven: Anarchist Quarterly	Journal	English	London (UK)
1988–1991	The Arousal	Newspaper	English	Pakistan
1988-1991	Homocore	Zine	English	San Francisco (US)
1989–2013	Profane Existence	Zine	English	Minneapolis, Minnesota (US)
late 1980s ?	Chainsaw Records	Zine	English	Portland (US)
1994–2014	SchNEWS	Newspaper	English	Brighton (UK)
1996–2010	Direct Action	Magazine	English	Manchester (UK)
1997-2015	Total Liberty / Anarchist Voices magazine	Magazine	English	British Isles
2000–2008	Green Anarchy	Magazine	English	Eugene, Oregon (US)
2001–2010	Abolishing the Borders from Below	Zine	German	Berlin (Germany)
2003-2008	Rancid News	Zine	English	London (UK)
2005–2015	Rolling Thunder	Zine	English	United States
2010	Róstur	Newspaper	Icelandic	Iceland
