= Elizabeth Flynn Rodgers =

Irish-American labor leader

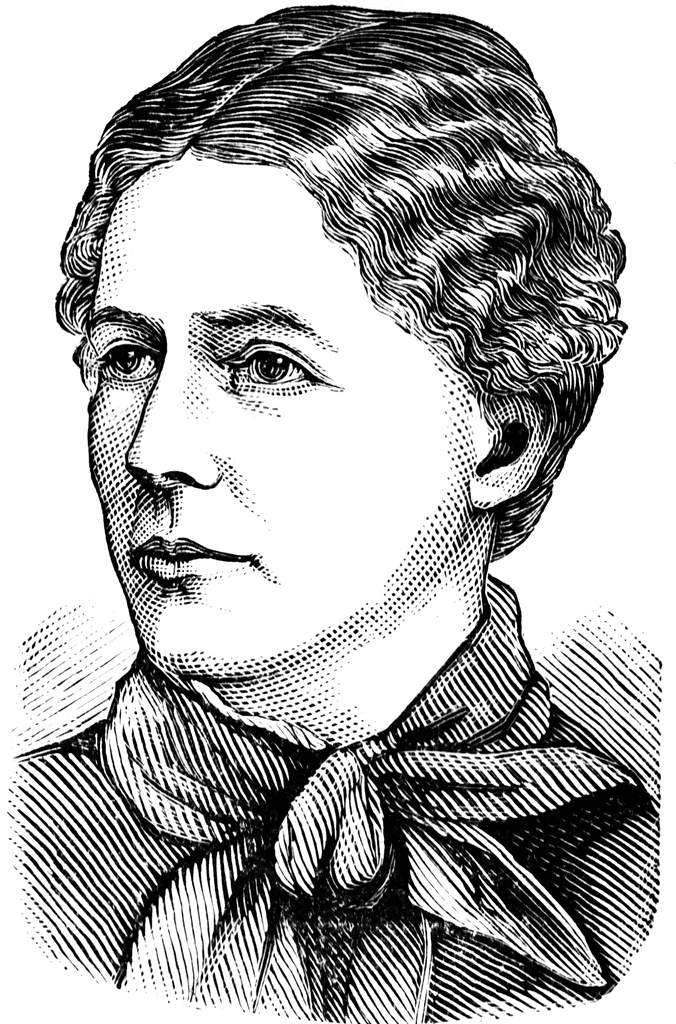
- Born: August 25, 1847; Woodford
- Died: August 27, 1939 (aged 92); Wauwatosa
- Resting place: Mount Olivet Cemetery
- Occupation: Labor leader

Elizabeth Flynn Rodgers (August 25, 1847 – August 27, 1939) was an Irish-American labor leader. One of the first women to hold an office in the Knights of Labor, Rodgers advocated for women's rights in the workplace while raising her ten children. In the 1870s, she led a small group of women to organize the Working Women's Union, the first labor union for women in Chicago. Later in life, she helped found a fraternal life insurance organization, the Women's Catholic Order of Foresters, and led the organization for over fifteen years.

== Early life ==
Elizabeth Flynn was born in Woodford, Ireland, on August 25, 1847. She was the daughter of Robert Flynn and Bridget (Campbell) Flynn. When Flynn was a child, her family moved to Canada, and she was raised and educated in London, Ontario.

As a young woman, she married George Rodgers, a socialist and union organizer. They both agitated for workers' rights and were blacklisted by companies, forcing them to move several times to find work. To support their growing family, Rodgers took in boarders while George sought work as an iron molder.

== Work in labor organizing ==
The family settled in Chicago in the early 1870s, and Rodgers increased her involvement in the labor movement alongside her husband. Despite comprising around 18% of the labor force, women were not initially welcome in the Knights of Labor. In response, in 1878, Rodgers led a small group of women to form the Working Women's Union (WWU), the first woman's union in Chicago. The WWU was made up primarily of non-wage earning women, seamstresses, and domestic servants, and its members included Lucy Parsons, Lizzie Swank, and Alzina Stevens. The union leadership worked to inform workers of their rights and joined the eight-hour day campaign movement.

In 1881, the Knights of Labor opened its membership to women. Rodgers was made a "Master Workman" (president) of District Assembly 24 in 1886, covering all of Chicago except the Stockyards. She was the first woman to hold that position in the Knights. Rodgers helped promote women's involvement in the Knights of Labor.

During her years of activism, Rodgers gave birth to ten children. She attended the Knights of Labor national convention in 1886 with her two-week-old baby, who The New York Times reported was the only non-delegate allowed in the meeting room. She was politically conservative, arguing that all Socialists were "good for is to agitate mischief". At the same time, she was a dedicated feminist; when her husband asked her to resign her post, she said "knowing my duty to my sex, I thought it was an opportunity to show our brothers how false that theory is that women are not good for anything." However, Rodgers declined a nomination for the post of general treasurer, saying she could not effectively serve in that role while caring for her children.

== Later life and death ==
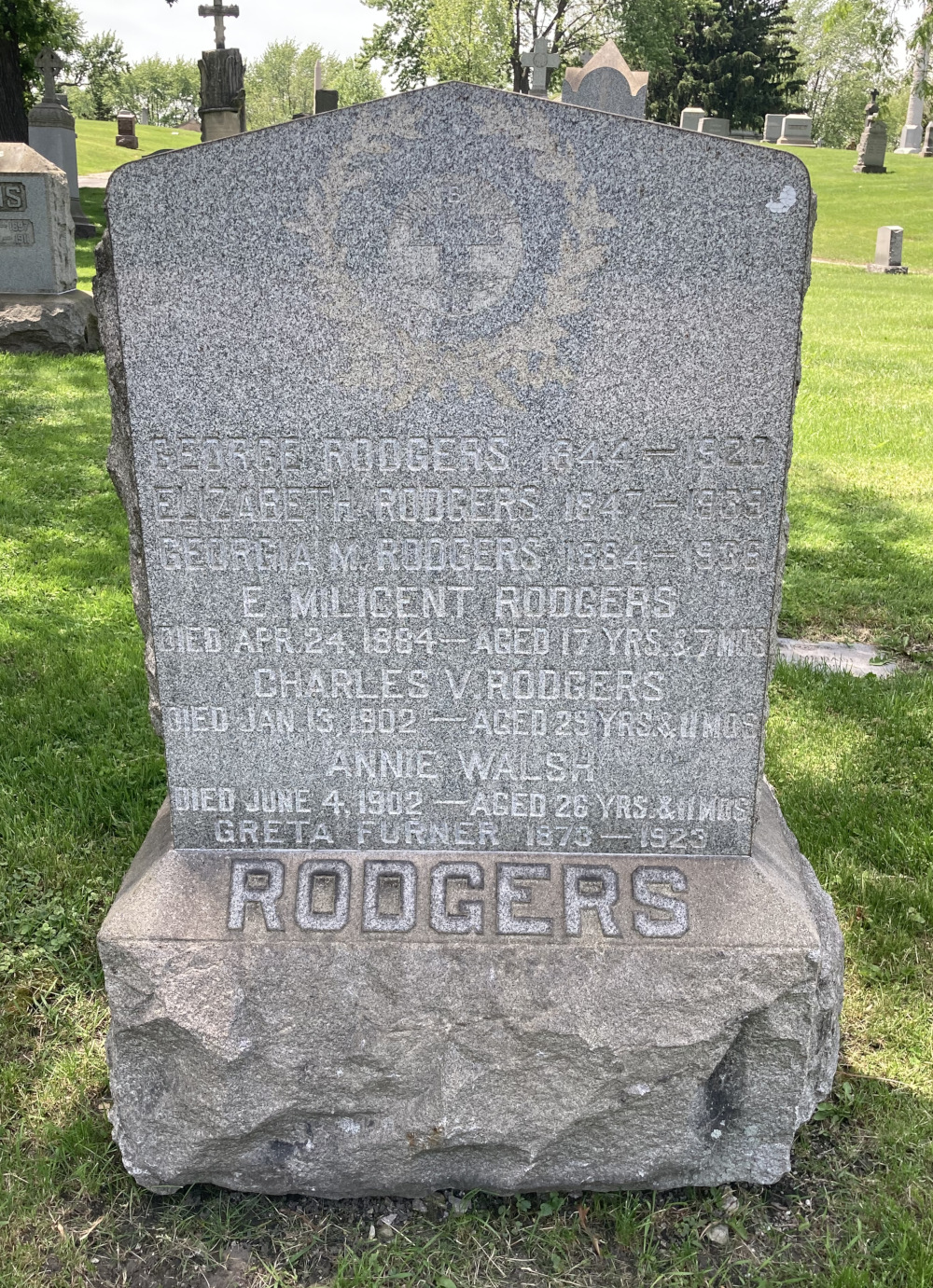
Rodgers' grave at Mount Olivet Cemetery

In 1887, as the Knights of Labor declined in membership and power, Rodgers left the organization and became a partner in Leavell and Rodgers Printers from 1889 to 1892.

She later pursued a career in insurance. Because the Catholic Order of Foresters did not permit women members, in 1891, she helped found the Women's Catholic Order of Foresters to allow female workers to be covered by life insurance. She also served as the organization's leader, High Chief Ranger, until 1908. The Women's Catholic Order of Foresters eventually became well-established across the United States, providing financial protection for Catholic families.

She died of a cerebral hemorrhage at the home of one of her daughters in Wauwatosa, Wisconsin, on August 27, 1939. She was buried at Mount Olivet Cemetery in Chicago.
