= Anarchism without adjectives =

Doctrine of anarchism without any qualifying labels

Anarchism without adjectives is a pluralist tendency of anarchism that opposes sectarianism and advocates for cooperation between different anarchist schools of thought. First formulated by the Spanish anarchists Ricardo Mella and Fernando Tarrida del Mármol, as a way to bridge the ideological divide between the collectivists and communist factions, it was later adopted by the Italian anarchist Errico Malatesta and the American anarchist Voltairine de Cleyre.

Anarchists without adjectives are suspicious of dogmatism and criticize prescriptions for a post-capitalist future, which they consider authoritarian. Instead they hold that a new society should be allowed to emerge spontaneously after a social revolution, which they believe could result in the experimental development of different economic forms in different locations. They thus tend to focus on taking action in the present, with contemporary forms outright rejecting utopianism.

== Background ==
After the founding of the Anti-authoritarian International, by 1876, debates between anti-authoritarians broke out over which economic system they would establish following a social revolution. Swiss anarchist leader James Guillaume spurred the debate with his proposition that, once a condition of post-scarcity was achieved, resources could be brought under common ownership and distributed "from each according to ability, to each according to need".

French and Italian members of the International advocated for a system of communist anarchism, in which the state and capitalism would be replaced by voluntary associations which would make goods and services freely available to all who needed them. On the other side, the Spanish section advocated for collectivist anarchism, which would distribute resources "to each according to contribution". At the 1877 Verviers Conference, James Guillaume attempted to overcome the split by arguing that "each group be free to determine its own solutions".

Guillaume's position was adopted by a number of Spanish anarchists, who advocated for the tolerance of different, coexisting anarchist schools of thought. In 1886, Catalan anarchists around the periodical Acracia began attempting to settle the communist-collectivist split by propagating a kind of "non-denominational" anarchism. Despite opposition from anarchist communists around the Tierra y Libertad paper, these anarchists began referring to themselves as "socialist anarchists" and used terms such as "indifferent anarchism" (Spanish: anarquismo a secas) in order to overcome the divide.

In 1888, the anti-sectarian campaign was adopted by a circle of anarchist intellectuals led by Antoni Pellicer, who formulated a perspective that rejected any qualifying labels for anarchism. This perspective was developed further by the political theorists Fernando Tarrida del Mármol and Ricardo Mella, who articulated an "unhyphenated form of anarchism" which they termed "anarchism without adjectives" (Spanish: Anarquismo sin adjetivos).

== Formulation ==
=== By Tarrida ===
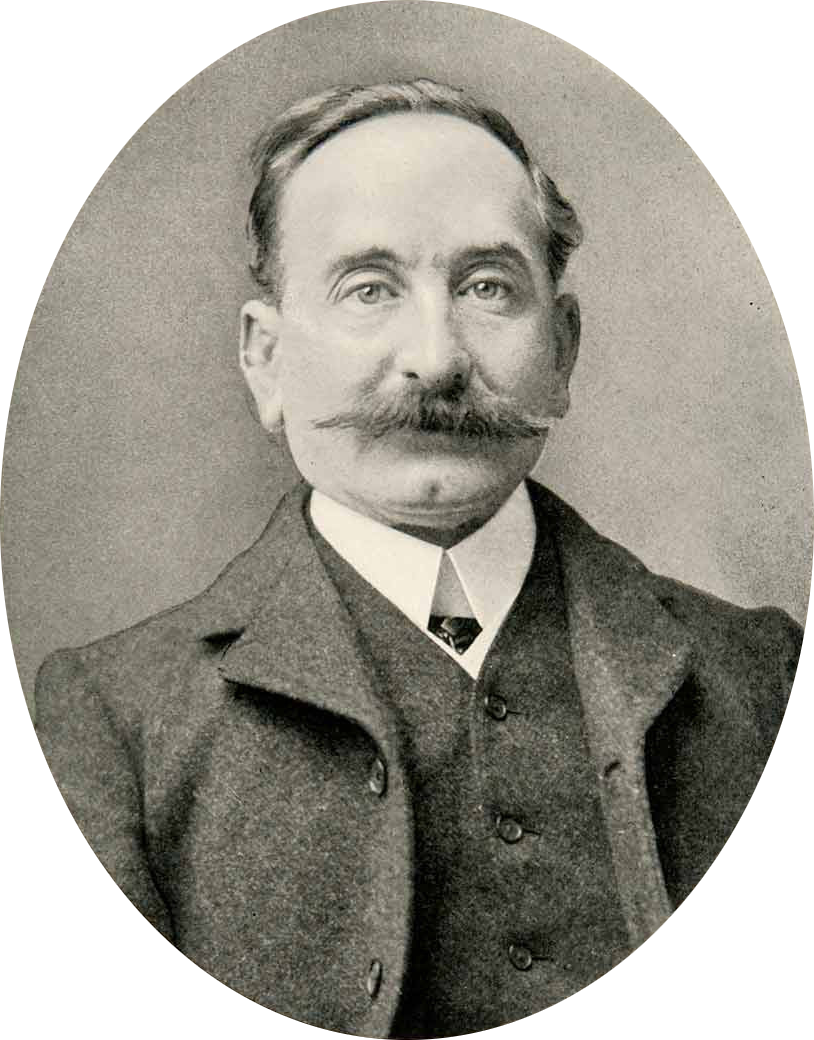
Fernando Tarrida del Mármol, the Spanish collectivist who coined the phrase "anarchism without adjectives"

A pupil of Anselmo Lorenzo, Tarrida had initially been attracted to collectivist anarchism, through the federalism of Pierre-Joseph Proudhon and Francesc Pi i Margall. By 1889, he had become a prolific anarchist speaker and writer for Acracia, winning support from many of Barcelona's workers, who delegated him to the International Workers Congresses of Paris. Drawing from his background in mathematics, Tarrida considered anarchism to be a universal philosophy with scientifically validated principles. Although himself a collectivist, he rejected rigid doctrine and refused to engage in the debate between the collectivists and communists, instead upholding Pellicer's formula for an anarchism that included a diversity of economic systems. From this position, he first developed his theory of "anarchism without adjectives".

Tarrida first used the term at a November 1889 meeting in Barcelona, when he called for anarchists to reject of all forms of dogma in order to conform closer with the principles of "nature, science and justice". The communist-collectivist feud, which dominated the anarchist discourse of the time, had encouraged Tarrida to issue an appeal for an ecumenical approach to anarchism, calling for tolerance between different anarchist tendencies in order to focus on the cause of revolutionary anarchism. He concluded that if anarchists were to be consistent with their anti-dogmatic tendencies, which upheld freedom of thought, they ought not to impose their own economic programmes on others. Nevertheless, the feud persisted, with French communists denouncing the Spanish collectivists as authoritarian and scrutinising Tarrida's proposal for an "anarchism without adjectives".

The following year, in the pages of the French communist newspaper Le Révolté, Tarrida replied that the pursuit of anarchy and the abolition of the State ought to be emphasized as the common foundation of anarchism. He held the economic question to be of "secondary importance", rejecting any rigid systematic theory and upholding the complementary potential of different anarchist economic propositions. The French communists, he argued, had become too ideologically rigid and puritanical, which had isolated them from other anarchist groups and rendered them ineffective as a force against the bourgeoisie. He concluded by encouraging them to drop their utopian tendencies to preconceive an immutable future anarchist society, so that they could better adapt to the changing social and economic conditions of the present. He also criticized the French communists for attempting to impose a "foreign style of anarchism" on Spanish collectivists, whose organizationalist tendencies had arisen from different material conditions and had proven an effective response to those conditions. Although Tarrida rejected the communists' indiscriminate anti-organizational stance, he was also opposed to rigidity within Spanish collectivism. For example, he accepted the dissolution of the Federation of Workers of the Spanish Region (FTRE) when it grew too bureaucratic to effectively achieve its original aims.

=== By Mella ===
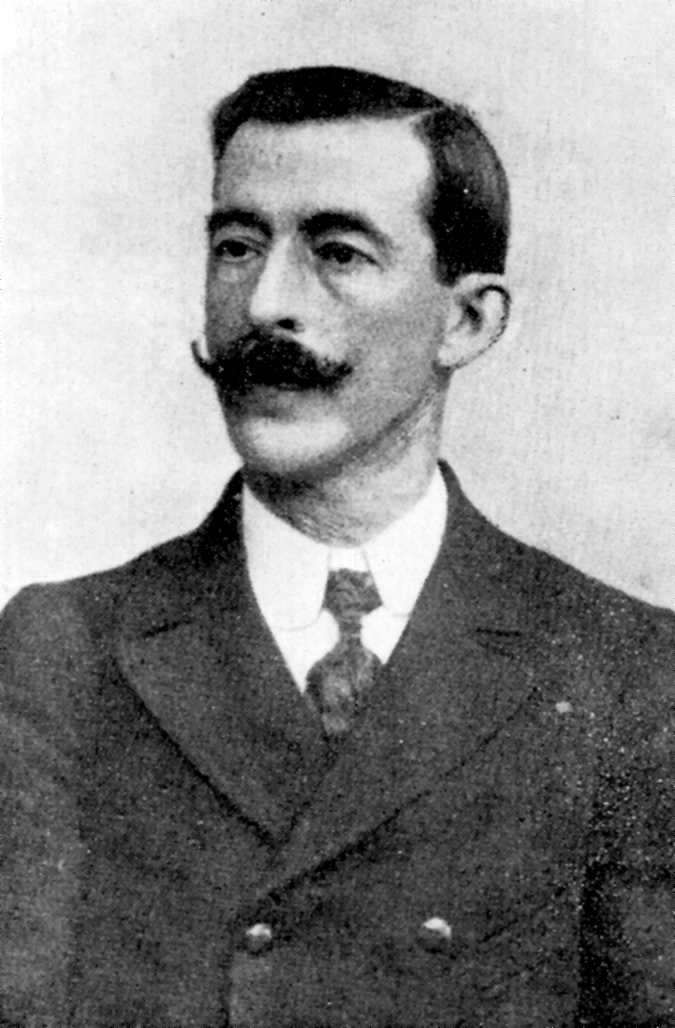
Ricardo Mella, another of the principle advocates of "anarchism without adjectives" as a means to resolve the collectivist-communist schism

A different approach to "anarchism without adjectives" was taken up by the prolific anarchist theorist Ricardo Mella. In contrast to Tarrida, who recommended that different anarchist systems be synthesized, Mella called for free experimentation to determine the best system for a given circumstance. Mella believed that the great divide within anarchism was not between communism and collectivism, but between tolerance and intransigence, the latter of which created divisions over the supremacy of different forms of dogma. When Mella began writing for Acracia, he initially called for tolerance between anarchist tendencies as a way to prevent communist ideas from becoming predominant in Spain. In his article "La reacción y la revolución", Mella argued against dogmatic economic prescriptions for a future anarchist society, declaring that a revolutionary movement could only arise from a diversity of perspectives that could "proceed according to whatever traditions and customs best suited the circumstances at hand".

Although Mella remained a staunch collectivist and anti-communist, he nevertheless opposed the internecine split between the two factions, attempting to keep the debate between them healthy by continuing his advocacy of non-denominational anarchism. As time went on, he became more tolerant of communism, considering it to be possible for it to coexist alongside other economic systems. He even went on to defend anarchist communists from attacks by the Italian criminologist Cesare Lombroso and translated the work of Peter Kropotkin, although he remained uncomfortable fully endorsing communist views for the rest of his life.

In 1889, Mella published the apotheosis of his development of anarchism without adjectives: his utopian novella La Nueva Utopía, which examined the possible social and economic forms of a future anarchist society. In the book, Mella depicts a society that had undergone a social revolution, resulting in the complete satisfaction of their needs and a harmonious cooperation between its inhabitants. Such an economic and social reorganization of society had been achieved after multiple centuries of experimentation and hard work, driven by scientific and technological progress, which had eliminated both toil and environmental pollution.

== Growth and adoption ==
=== In Europe ===
Throughout the 1890s, Tarrida and Mella continued their campaign for the adoption of a non-sectarian form of anarchism, eventually achieving some success. Many other anarchists, including Anselmo Lorenzo and Joan Montseny, began calling for an end to the dogmatic schism between communists and collectivists, with the adjectives themselves even taking on negative connotations among those who had tired of the split. Inspired by Tarrida and Mella, many other European anarchists began to eschew hyphenated labels and refer solely to anarchy as their end goal, rejecting prescriptions for a future society as inherently authoritarian. Anarchism without adjectives was taken up by Élisée Reclus and Max Nettlau, the latter of whom called for a non-sectarian anarchism that accounted for both communism and individualism, without universalizing either, leaving room for experimentation in different possibilities of economic organization.

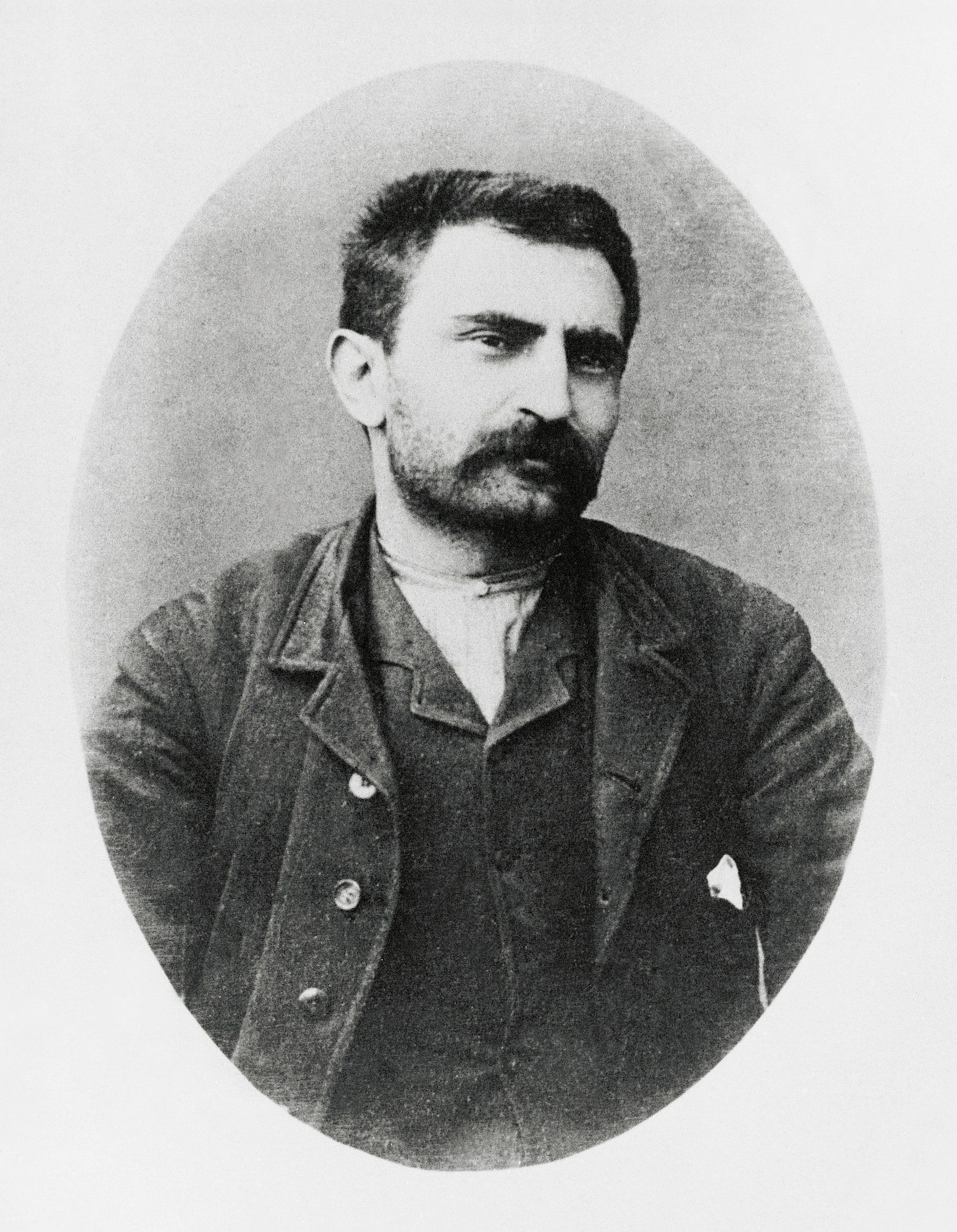
Errico Malatesta, an Italian anarchist socialist who advocated for anarchists of different schools of thought to cooperate within a single plural organization

The position was also adopted by the Italian communist Errico Malatesta, who likewise argued against dogmatism within the anarchist movement, declaring: "Let us do away with all exclusivism of schools of thinking." Malatesta warned that "one must beware, at the risk of certain disaster, of supposing that one's system is the only, and infallible, one [...] and that its success must be assured at all costs, by means other than those which depend on persuasion, which spring from the evidence of facts." Malatesta posited that as anarchism centres spontaneity, it would be wrong for anarchists to impose economic prescriptions. He concluded that different anarchist tendencies should therefore unite within a single organization, which centred a shared anarchist method. Malatesta also began referring to himself as an "anarchist socialist", in order to promote inclusivity of different anarchist schools. In the pages of Le Révolté, Malatesta declared that "[i]t is not right for us, to say the least, to fall into strife over mere hypotheses".

By the turn of the 20th century, anarchism without adjectives had spread beyond Europe to the Americas, where many anarchists were increasingly migrating. In Buenos Aires, Antoni Pellicer argued that Argentine workers ought to reject dogmatism and embrace anarchism without adjectives. It also found its way to the United States, where American anarchists were brought over to the idea by the arguments of Tarrida.

=== In the United States ===
In the United States, there was also an intense debate between individualist anarchists around Benjamin Tucker and the anarchist communists around Johann Most, who dismissed each other's ideas as un-anarchistic. Troubled by the "bitter debates" between anarchists from divergent schools of economic thought, those who did not see a need to confine themselves to one particular school of thought called for more tolerance among anarchists, with some of them explicitly terming it "anarchism without adjectives".

Starting in the 1880s, many American anarchists began to prioritize their commonly held anti-statism over their differing economic methods, which they saw as of secondary importance and something to be left until the future. In 1893, William and Lizzie Holmes organized an international anarchist conference in Chicago, where they attempted to formulate a common programme for anarchists to unite behind. They were joined by Voltairine de Cleyre, Honoré Jackson, C. L. James, Lucy Parsons and William Henry van Ornum, but the conference was boycotted by Benjamin Tucker and Johann Most, who were still locked in an ideological conflict. Over the subsequent years, the Holmes couple and their circle continued attempting to reconcile the different anarchist factions, even going as far as to advocate for an anti-authoritarian united front with Georgists, socialists and nationalists. In 1895, the Jewish anarchist J. A. Maryson began calling for a "pure and simple" anarchism that upheld freedom of opinion, arguing that diversity was an essential component of freedom.

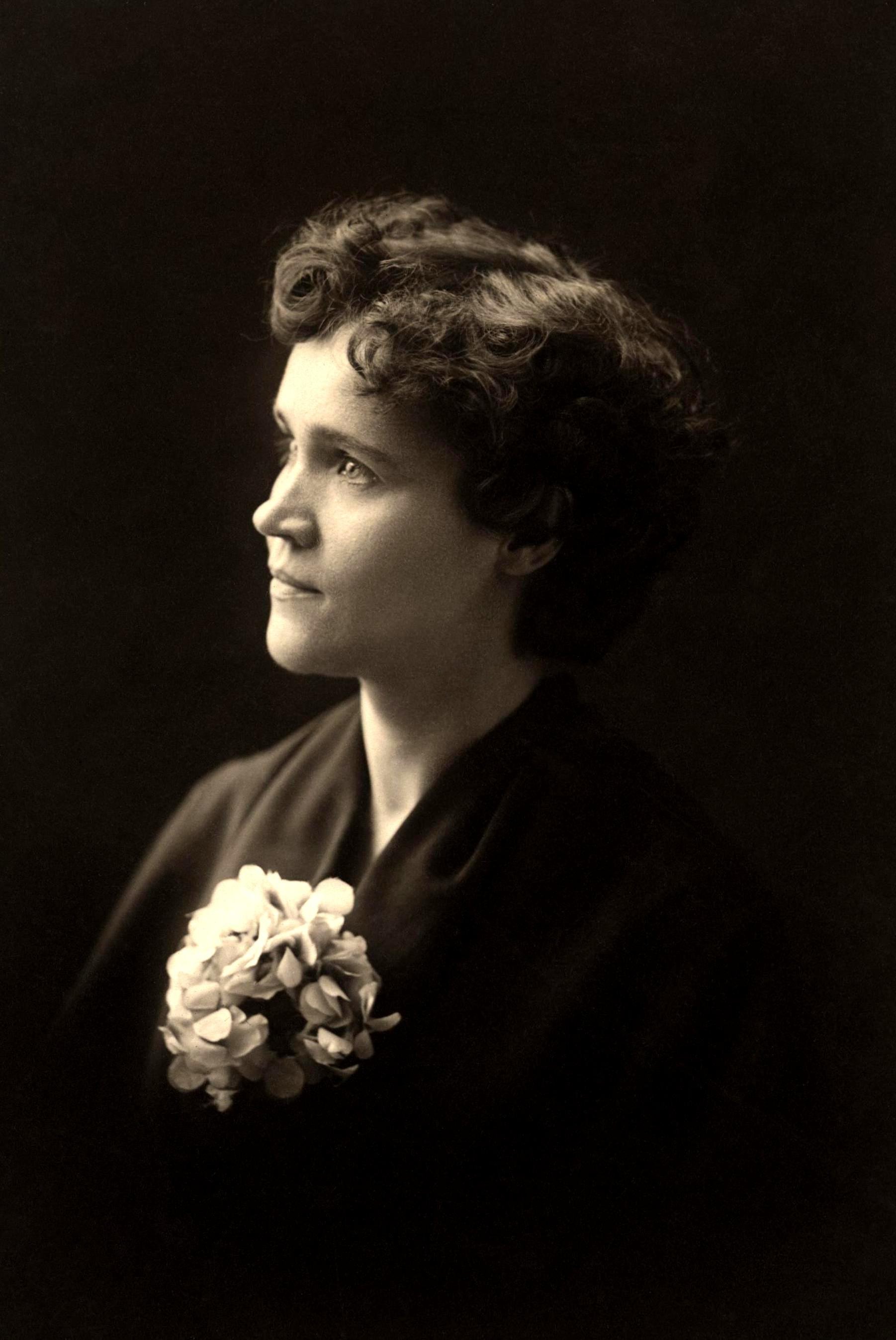
Voltairine de Cleyre, an American anarchist whose advocacy of anarchism without adjectives has inspired sections of contemporary anarchism

By the 1900s, the most visible American exponent of anarchism without adjectives was Voltairine de Cleyre, who adopted the term from Tarrida, and likewise advocated for cooperation between different anarchist philosophies and strategies. She criticized economic dogmatism, believing that after the state was abolished, different localities would be free to experiment in different economic forms of anarchism, ranging from mutualism to communism.

During the last years of her life, de Cleyre argued passionately against anarchist sectarianism, declaring her desire to rid the anarchist movement of "those outrageous excommunications which belong properly to the Church of Rome, and which serve no purpose but to bring us into deserved contempt with outsiders." Skeptical of "high-sounding theories", which she considered to be indicative of intellectual elitism, de Cleyre preferred to support action in the present rather than indulge in debates over the future. She believed that a future free society could not be forecast, due to the uncertainty of how society might evolve, and thus upheld all experiments in the direction of greater freedom as intrinsically good.

As she saw shortcomings in each anarchist school of thought, arguing for the best elements of each to be synthesized into a more pragmatic philosophy, historian Paul Avrich argued that de Cleyre "cannot be fitted into any single anarchist category". Until the end of her life, she insisted on labelling herself simply as an "anarchist", even as she personally moved from American individualism towards the anarchist communism advocated by Emma Goldman. Herself inspired by Max Stirner's individualist anarchism, Goldman also came to reject visionary thinking of "blueprints for the future", instead declaring that anarchist methods must be adapted depending on the circumstances of different places and times.

Anarchism without adjectives was later taken up by Luigi Galleani and the Galleanisti, who went so far as to reject formal organizational structures, claiming the end point of any organization was to move towards conservatism and eventually become reactionary. Other Italian-American anarchists, who were not followers of Galleani, also came to consider themselves anarchists without adjectives, rejecting specific currents and individual leaders.

== Contemporary developments ==
Eventually, the term "anarchism without adjectives" largely fell out of use, although its anti-sectarian principles were still implicitly upheld by some contemporary anarchists, following the development of diverse new social movements. Research by Dana M. Williams found that North American anarchists were more likely to reject the labels of "red" or "green anarchist", in favour of simply identifying as "anarchist", "anti-authoritarian" or some form of "anarchist without adjectives".

Voltairine de Cleyre's contributions to anarchism without adjectives have been particularly influential on the development of contemporary anarchism, which has often neglected prescriptive models for alternatives to globalization and neoliberalism. De Cleyre's conception of anarchism without adjectives was adopted by the anarchist historian Peter Marshall, who argued against false binaries that separate economic systems or dichotomize the individual against the community. The anarchist communist Wayne Price has also proposed that a post-capitalist transition would be carried out in an "experimental, pluralist, and decentralized society", which would utilize different solutions to the specific issues that affect them. Post-anarchism, while attaching an adjective to anarchism, has also argued for a polythetic classification of different anarchist schools of thought, proposing an "anarchism with many possible adjectives".

== See also ==
- Anarchist synthesis

== Bibliography ==
- Avrich, Paul (1978). "Anarchism without Adjectives". An American Anarchist: The Life of Voltairine de Cleyre. Princeton University Press. pp. 144–170. ISBN 0-691-04657-3. LCCN 78-51153.
- Avrich, Paul (1995). Anarchist Voices: An Oral History of Anarchism in America. Princeton University Press. ISBN 0-691-03412-5. OCLC 30476588.
- Campbell, Michelle M. (2013). "Voltairine de Cleyre and the Anarchist Canon". Anarchist Developments in Cultural Studies (1): 64–81. ISSN 1923-5615.
- Carson, Kevin (2017). "Anarchism and Markets". In Jun, Nathan (ed.). Brill's Companion to Anarchism and Philosophy. Leiden: Brill. pp. 81–119. doi:10.1163/9789004356894_005. ISBN 978-90-04-35689-4.
- Esenwein, George Richard (1989). "Anarquismo sin adjectivos". Anarchist Ideology and the Working-class Movement in Spain, 1868–1898. University of California Press. pp. 134–154. ISBN 978-0520063983.
- Graham, Robert (2018). "Anarchism and the First International". In Adams, Matthew S.; Levy, Carl (eds.). The Palgrave Handbook of Anarchism. London: Palgrave Macmillan. pp. 325–342. doi:10.1007/978-3-319-75620-2_19. ISBN 978-3319756196. S2CID 158605651.
- Heroux, Erick (2010). "PostAnarchia Repertoire". Anarchist Developments in Cultural Studies. 2010 (1): 19–30. ISSN 1923-5615.
- Marshall, Peter H. (2008) [1992]. Demanding the Impossible: A History of Anarchism. London: Harper Perennial. ISBN 978-0-00-686245-1. OCLC 218212571.
- Nettlau, Max (1996). A Short History of Anarchism. Freedom Press. pp. 195–201. ISBN 978-0900384899. OCLC 37529250.
- Sartwell, Crispin (2017). "Anarchism and Nineteenth-Century American Political Thought". In Jun, Nathan (ed.). Brill's Companion to Anarchism and Philosophy. Leiden: Brill. pp. 454–483. doi:10.1163/9789004356894. ISBN 978-90-04-35689-4. S2CID 171479284.
- Shannon, Deric (2018). "Anti-Capitalism and Libertarian Political Economy". In Adams, Matthew S.; Levy, Carl (eds.). The Palgrave Handbook of Anarchism. London: Palgrave Macmillan. pp. 91–106. doi:10.1007/978-3-319-75620-2_5. ISBN 978-3319756196. S2CID 242094330.
- Turcato, Davide (2018). "Anarchist Communism". In Adams, Matthew S.; Levy, Carl (eds.). The Palgrave Handbook of Anarchism. London: Palgrave Macmillan. pp. 237–248. doi:10.1007/978-3-319-75620-2_13. ISBN 978-3319756196. S2CID 242094330.
- Williams, Dana M. (2009). "Red vs. green: regional variation of anarchist ideology in the United States". Journal of Political Ideologies. 14 (2): 189–210. doi:10.1080/13569310902925816. S2CID 33888366.
