= Lucy Parsons =

American labor organizer (c.1851–1942)

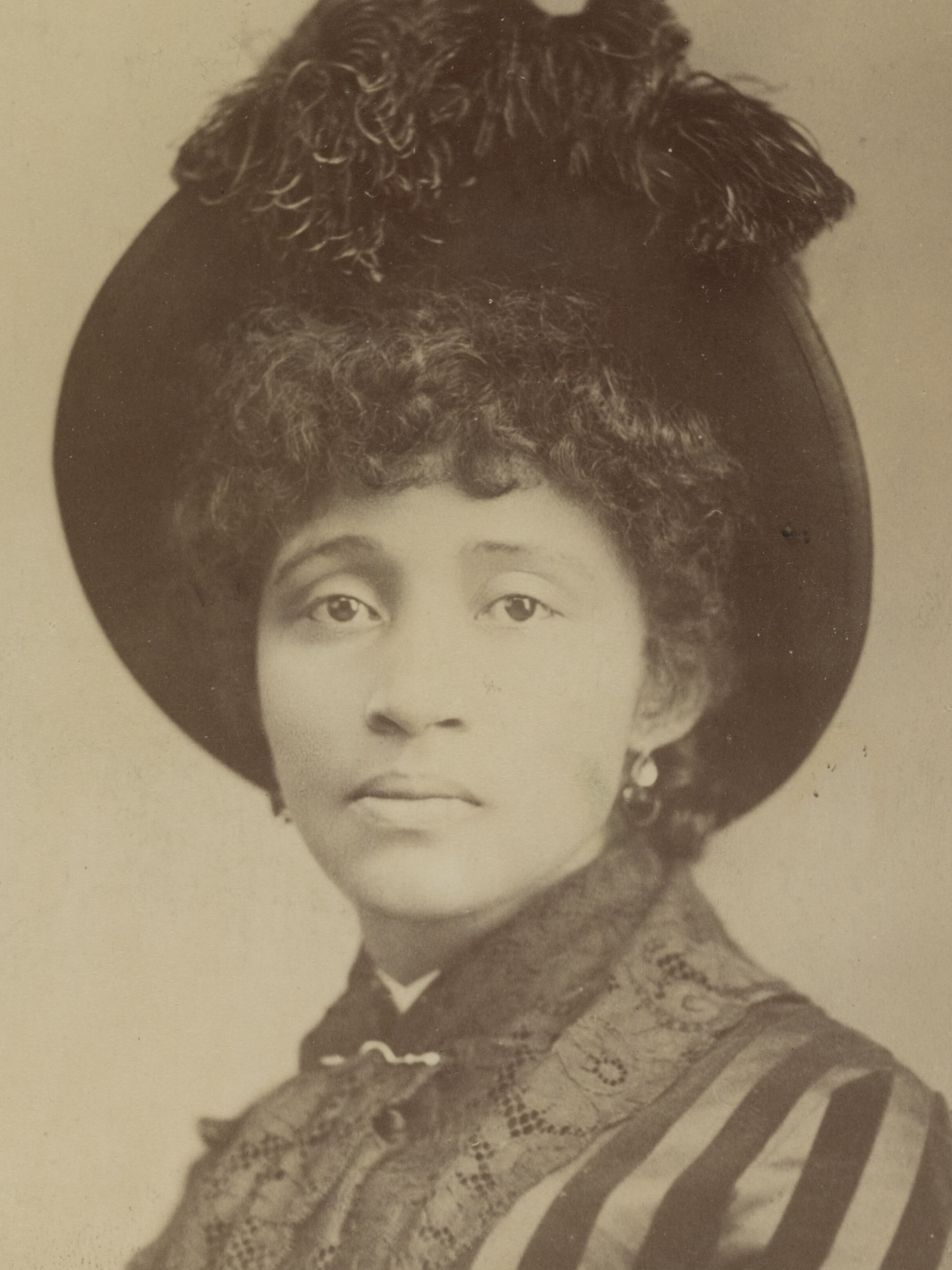
- Parsons in 1886
- Born: c. 1851; Texas or Virginia, US
- Died: March 7, 1942 (aged c. 91); Chicago, Illinois, US
- Other names: Carter; Diaz; Gonzalez; Hull
- Occupations: Labor organizer; Author; Speaker; Newspaper editor
- Years active: 1870s–1940s
- Movement: Social anarchism; Anarcho-communism
- Partners: Oliver Benton; Albert Parsons; Martin Lacher; George Markstall
- Children: 2 or 3

Lucy E. Parsons (c. 1851 – March 7, 1942) was an American social anarchist and later anarcho-communist, well known throughout her long life for her fiery speeches and writings. She was a founding member of the Industrial Workers of the World. There are different versions of Parsons' early life: she herself said she was of mixed Mexican and Native American ancestry; historians believe she was born to an African-American slave, possibly in Virginia, then perhaps married a black freedman in Texas. She met the activist Albert Parsons in Waco, Texas, and claimed to have married him although no records have been found. They moved to Chicago together in late 1873 and her ideology was shaped by the harsh repression of workers in the Chicago railroad strike of 1877. She argued for labor organization and class struggle, writing polemical texts and speaking at events. She joined the Workingmen's Party of the United States and later the Knights of Labor, and she set up the Chicago Working Women's Union with her friend Lizzie Swank and other women.

Parsons had two children and worked in Chicago as a seamstress, later opening her own shop. After her husband was executed in 1887 following his conviction for being a ringleader in the Haymarket affair, she became internationally famous as an anarchist speaker, touring frequently across the United States and visiting England. She wrote articles and edited radical newspapers. She was helped financially by the Pioneer Aid and Support Association and wrote the biography The Life of Albert R. Parsons with her young lover Martin Lacher. In the decades following the 1917 Russian Revolution, Parsons moved towards communism. The Chicago police regarded her as a dangerous political figure and attempted many times to stop her from speaking publicly. She continued her activism as she grew older, clashing with the anarchist Emma Goldman over their differing attitudes to free love and supporting challenges to miscarriages of justice in the cases of Angelo Herndon, Tom Mooney, and the Scottsboro Boys. She died in a house fire on March 7, 1942. Her partner George Markstall returned to find the building on fire and was unable to rescue her; he died the following day. She was buried in the German Waldheim Cemetery, where the Haymarket Martyrs' Monument stands. After her death, Parsons was primarily referenced as the wife of Albert Parsons, until recent scholarship and two book-length biographies have commemorated her own achievements. The Chicago Park District named a park on Belmont Avenue after her in 2004.

== Early life ==
Little is known for certain about Parsons' early life. (Note: Historians disagree regarding Parsons' ethnicity, since no records have been found to give a definitive version. They also disagree on her year of birth, giving the following dates: 1849 (Ashbaugh); 1851 (Jones, Kinna); "1853?" (Perry); 1853 (Shone). Her death certificate says 1859.) The historian Caroline Ashbaugh states in her biography of Parsons that she was born the daughter of a slave in 1849 and was possibly called Lucy Gathings; through her life Parsons also used the surnames Carter, Diaz, Gonzalez and Hull. There is confusion over Parsons' middle name; while historians such as Philip S. Foner give it as Eldine, both the birth certificate of her daughter and her own death certificate supply the name Ella. Parsons herself told different versions of her life history. She denied being of African heritage and said that she had Mexican and Native American parents, alternating between which one was which. When later events made her famous, national newspapers tried to investigate her Texas heritage but were unable to do so. One story she told was that she was born in Texas to Marie del Gather (who was of Spanish-Mexican ancestry) and John Waller who was Muscogee. Her entry in the American National Biography suggests she may have been daughter to Pedro Diáz González and his wife Marie. Contemporary reporters speculated about her background.

In her biography of Parsons, the social historian Jacqueline Jones states that she was born a slave in Virginia and in 1863 at the age of 12 was brought to McLennan County, Texas, by her owner Thomas J. Taliaferro along with her mother and brother. On this account she was called Lucia; she then moved to Waco, Texas, where people were reinventing their identities as they moved on from their past lives as slaves or Confederate soldiers. She began living with (and possibly married) a black freedman called Oliver Benton, formerly known as Oliver Gathings because slaves were given the surnames of their owners. He was around 35 or 36 and she was about 16 or 17 years old. Benton paid $1.50 per month for her education at a local black school and they may have had a child together who died at a young age. Ashbaugh suggests that Parsons was (like Benton) a former slave of the Gathings brothers, since Philip Gathings had a daughter named Lucy in 1849 and Parsons may have been named after her. While slave records do not preserve names, the Gathings brothers did each own two slave girls in 1860 who would have been around Parsons' age.

Whilst in Waco, Lucy met Albert Parsons. He was a white man who had fought in the American Civil War on the losing Confederate side then after the war had become a Radical Republican agitating for black civil rights; he was shot in the leg for helping black people to register to vote. It is doubtful they were ever married since no records have been found and there were at the time anti-miscegenation laws. They both claimed that they married in Austin in 1872 and she told the Dictionary of American Biography for Albert's entry that they were married on June 10, 1871. The historian Lucie C. Price was unable to find any records either of the marriage certificate or of the official whom Parsons said had recorded the marriage. Ashbaugh asserts they would have found it difficult to form an interracial marriage, yet the couple lived together as husband and wife, with Lucy taking the last name Parsons.

== Chicago ==
Lucy and Albert Parsons moved to Chicago at the end of 1873. The industrial city was growing rapidly. The couple lived in poor working-class slum tenements around Larrabee Street and North Avenue on the North Side. Albert Parsons worked as a compositor for newspapers and Lucy Parsons earned money as a seamstress. The couple became involved in the Social-Democratic Workingmen's Party of North America, later the Workingmen's Party of the United States. Parsons also demonstrated her willingness to stand up for her rights by twice taking white people to court in 1875, over an unpaid bill and a neighbor disturbance, respectively.

When the Chicago railroad strike of 1877 occurred as part of the Great Upheaval, Albert Parsons and fellow socialists Philip Van Patten and George Schilling spoke to a crowd of 25,000 people. He was then fired from his job at the Chicago Times and blacklisted; he had a gun put to his head by two unknown men when he went to the Chicago Tribune to ask for work. Lucy Parsons was forced to get a job to support her family and started a shop selling suits and dresses. She expanded the business into Parsons & Co., Manufacturers of Ladies' and Children's Clothing, opening a workspace at 306 Mohawk Street and employing her now blacklisted partner.

Parsons' first writings to be published were letters to the editor of The Socialist concerning the hunger and poverty of the working class. She began to lecture after the birth of her son, Albert Parsons Jr., in September 1879 (on the birth certificate she wrote her maiden name as Carter and Virginia as her place of birth). Parsons' political perspective was evolving, and she determined that her personal problems were insignificant since only social movements could achieve change. She was more militant than her partner, campaigning against voting at a time when she did not have the right to do it herself. Her observations of the 1877 strike had taught her that workers were powerful when united. She developed her social anarchist approach, in which she condoned political violence, urged self-defense against racial violence and called for class struggle against religion. Alongside women such as Elizabeth Chambers Morgan, Elizabeth Flynn Rodgers, Alzina Stevens and Lizzie Swank she helped to set up the Chicago Working Women's Union (WWU) and attended meetings while pregnant, at a time when child-bearing women were expected to stay at home. Swank became a good friend of Parsons and as soon as the Knights of Labor decided to admit women, they both joined up. The WWU encouraged women to unionize and promoted the eight-hour day.

On April 20, 1881, Parsons gave birth to her second child, Lulu Eda, who was to die of lymphedema at the age of eight. In 1883, the insurrectionary anarchist Johann Most visited Chicago and met the Parsons family. In November, Albert Parsons founded the American Group of Chicago as the local wing of the International Working People's Association (IWPA). Lucy attended meetings, sometimes in her own home, developing her left-wing politics. When the IWPA published the radical newspaper The Alarm in 1884, she was one of the main contributors, theorising that violence was inevitable in class struggle and that trade unions were the engine of the revolution. She wrote texts which included "Our civilization. Is it worth saving?", "The factory child. Their wrongs portrayed and their rescue demanded" and "The negro. Let him leave politics to the politician and prayers to the preacher". Her article "To tramps, the unemployed, the disinherited and miserable" was reprinted from The Alarm and sold more than 10,000 copies between May and November 1885. The same year, Parsons published "Dynamite! The only voice the oppressors of the people can understand" in the Denver Labor Enquirer, inspired by Most's promotion of propaganda of the deed. On April 28, 1885, Parsons and Lizzie Holmes (née Swank) led an IWPA march to protest outside a banquet at the Board of Trade Building, which was newly constructed at a cost of $2 million. During this time period, Parsons and her partner would often address crowds of 1,000 to 5,000 people on Sundays at the shore of Lake Michigan. Labor organizer Mother Jones attended and thought the speeches advocated too much violence.

== Haymarket affair ==
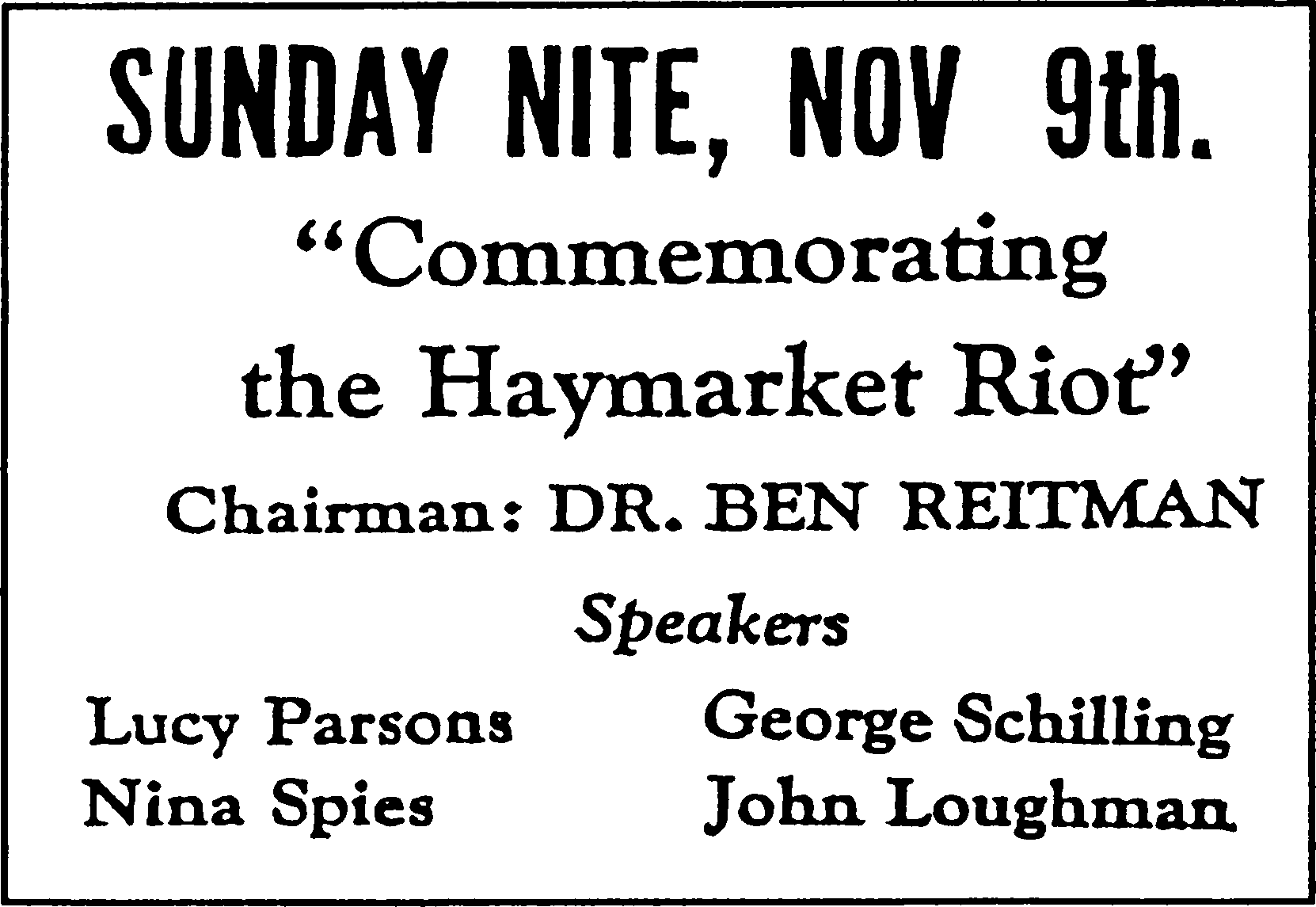
Poster for a 1930s event commemorating the Haymarket affair, with Parsons speaking alongside John Loughlan, George Schilling and Nina Spies

On Saturday May 1, 1886, 300,000 workers went on strike across the US. In Chicago, the Parsons family led a peaceful demonstration of 80,000 people down Michigan Avenue, demanding the eight-hour day. Two days later, Chicago Police and private security guards known as Pinkertons attacked striking workers at the McCormick Reaper factory, shooting at least one person dead. On May 4, Lucy Parsons organized a meeting to support striking sewing women and asked Albert Parsons to join her; on the same night, at the nearby Haymarket Square 176 police officers had ordered a demonstration to disperse when a bomb was thrown from the crowd. In what became known later as the Haymarket affair, the police opened fire, shooting at least seven workers dead, while one police officer died and six others succumbed to their injuries later; it is likely that in the chaos the officers were killed by police bullets. The Parsons family was at Zepf's Hall nearby and heard the blast; (Note: Jones suggests that this was a story agreed upon by Lucy and Albert Parsons to help his case at trial.) Albert fled the city, first staying with Lizzie and William Holmes in Geneva, Illinois, then moving to Waukesha, Wisconsin where he worked as a laborer and resided with Daniel Hoan.

On May 5, the day after the bombing, Lucy Parsons was in the office of the Arbeiter-Zeitung when it was raided by police officers without a search warrant. They arrested the entire staff including Parsons, whom an officer called "a black bitch"; she was released without charge since the police were hoping she would lead them to her partner. Over the next six months she was briefly detained several times. Other mass arrests and unlawful searches were made and Julius S. Grinnell, the Illinois Attorney General who would go on to prosecute the case, said "Make the raids first then look up the law afterwards". Lucy Parsons commented in the Denver Labor Enquirer the raids were extensive. A Grand Jury announced charges against 31 men on May 27, including murder charges against ten, the most fervent advocates of propaganda by the deed (including Lucy Parsons and Lizzie Holmes) had not been charged.

The attitude of the US labor movement towards those accused was mixed, with some militants voicing support and others concerned by the loss of life at the square. While Albert was in hiding, he wrote to Lucy Parsons asking her to talk to the lawyer William P. Black and discuss the conditions of his surrender. Black encouraged her to bring him to court, believing there was little chance of conviction. His chief aide William A. Foster disagreed, thinking it best that Parsons remained free. On the first day of trial, Albert Parsons appeared after spending some hours with Lucy and surrendered to Judge Joseph Gary. The mainstream media campaign against anarchists was intense, with the Chicago Tribune calling for executions and Texas newspapers revisiting the presumed scandal of Parsons leaving her marriage with Oliver Benton for Albert. The Waco Day headlined a story "Beast Parsons: the sneaking snarl from some moral morass in which he hides; miscegenationist, murderer, moral outlaw, for whom the gallows waits". In response, Parsons visited her partner in jail with a journalist from the Tribune and he said he had been romantically attached to Benton's wife but that she was a different person to Lucy.

Lucy Parsons attended every day of the trial and was there when her partner, George Engel, Samuel Fielden, Adolph Fischer, Louis Lingg, Michael Schwab and August Spies were sentenced to death. Afterwards, she made a seven-week lecture tour in order to raise funds for the defendants; she addressed more than 200,000 people in places such as Cincinnati, New York and Philadelphia. In New Haven, Connecticut, she said "You may have expected me to belch forth great flames of dynamite and stand before you with bombs in my hands. If you are disappointed, you have only the capitalist press to thank for it". She spoke with the socialist Thomas J. Morgan at a rally in Sheffield, Indiana, which was just across the state line from Illinois, so that the Chicago police were unable to stop the event. In Columbus, Ohio, she was prevented from speaking and sent by the mayor to Franklin County Jail. When not lecturing, Parsons would visit her partner in jail, taking the children with her. She stopped her tailoring shop and the family was forced to move out of their Indiana Street apartment to another one on Milwaukee Avenue. After his death sentence was announced, Albert Parsons wrote to his wife "I have one request to make of you: Commit no rash act to yourself when I am gone, but take up the great cause of Socialism where I am compelled to lay it down." An Amnesty Association was founded and took action to save Albert Parsons and the six other men on death row; Lucy Parsons spent her time fundraising and collecting signatures on the street, and the campaign to commute the sentences was supported even by those such as Melville Elijah Stone, editor of the Chicago Daily News, who had previously condemned the anarchists.

On Thursday November 10, the Governor of Illinois Richard J. Oglesby announced that Parsons and three others would be executed the next day. The next morning, Lucy Parsons took the children to see him for the last time, accompanied by Lizzie Holmes. She was prevented from entering the jail by a police cordon and when she attempted to cross it, the group was arrested and taken to the Chicago Avenue police station where they were strip-searched for explosives and detained until 15:00. The casket containing the corpse of Albert Parsons was taken to Lucy Parsons' shop, where over 10,000 people came to pay respects in one day. A total of between 10,000 and 15,000 people attended the funeral on Sunday, November 13; Parsons walked behind the casket. Twenty years later, she edited and published The famous speeches of the eight Chicago anarchists in court which sold more than 10,000 copies in 18 months.

== Continued activism ==
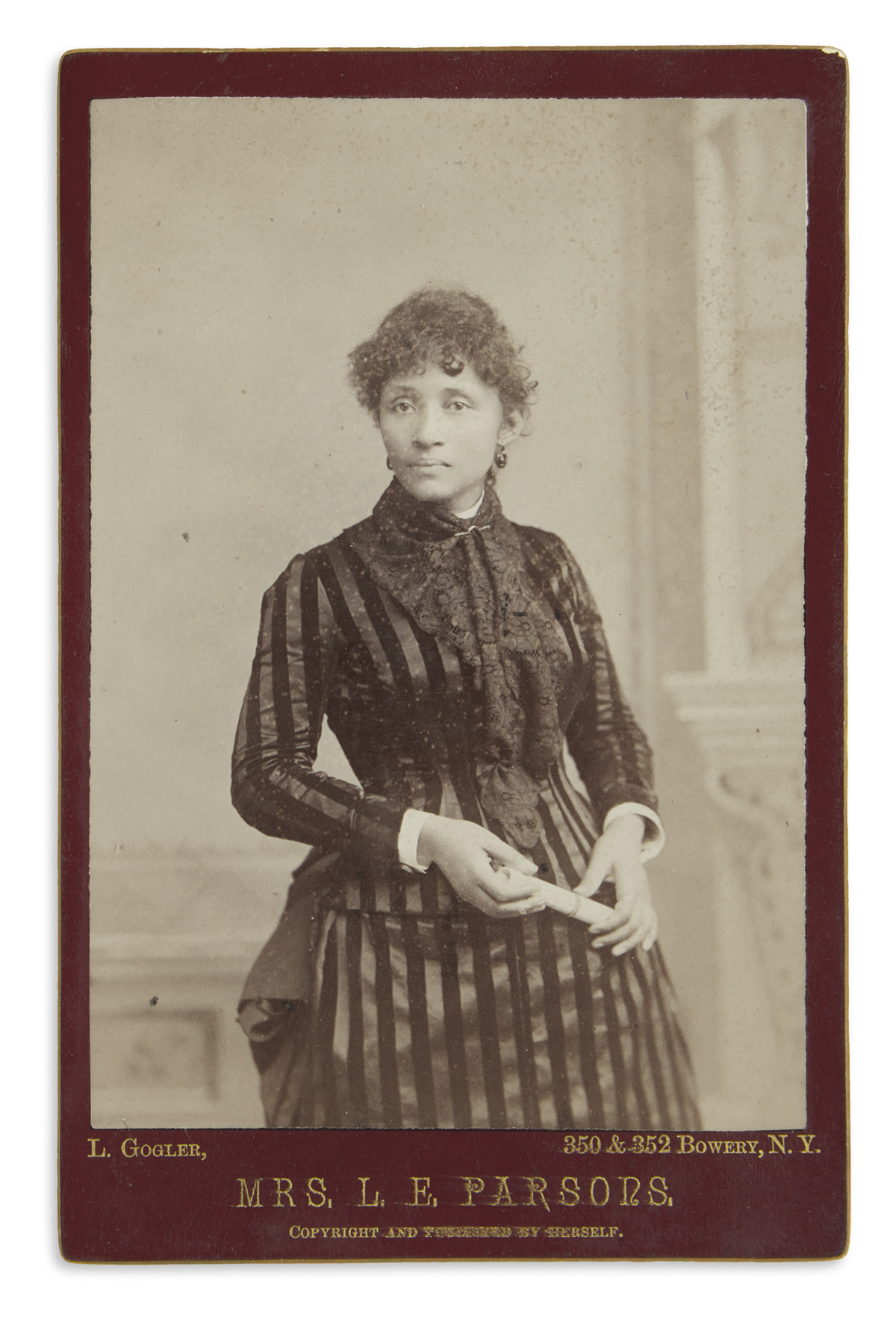
A photograph of Parsons taken in 1886

Following the funeral of her partner, Parsons continued her political activism. The Pioneer Aid and Support Association gave her a stipend of $12 per week and in March 1888 she toured the East Coast making speeches. During the 1887 Chicago mayoral election, Parsons supported the United Labor Party candidate against the eventual victor, Republican John A. Roche. Roche framed the contest as a battle between the US flag and the flags of anarchism and communism, later attempting to ban the use of red flags at left-wing meetings. Parsons began to work on the biography which she later published as The Life of Albert R. Parsons. She was helped by Martin Lacher, a young German who lived with her from 1889 onwards and later became her lover. In October 1888, she travelled to London, where she met anarchists Peter Kropotkin and William Morris and visited the Tower of London and Westminster Abbey with Jane Morris. She addressed the Socialist League and disagreed with Annie Besant, a leader of the matchgirls' strike, over the issue of violence. When she arrived back in New York City by boat, a reporter interviewed her and then claimed that she was getting married to the German democratic socialist Eduard Bernstein. Parsons' anarchist contemporaries such as Justus Schwab condemned the story and she denied it.

After Parsons returned to Chicago in 1889, the newly renamed Albert R. Parsons Assembly of the Knights of Labor publicized a forthcoming lecture by her entitled Review of the Labor Movement in Europe. Chicago police chief George W. Hubbard resolved to stop the event and on the day itself, Lacher and another man were arrested as they protested for Parsons' right to speak. Hubbard announced that "she simply can't speak in Chicago" and repeatedly stopped events occurring. The same year, Parsons published The Life of Albert R. Parsons with a foreword by George Schilling. In November 1890, Johann Most, Parsons and Hugh O. Pentecost were prevented from speaking in Newark, New Jersey when the police closed the hall. Parsons then attempted to speak on the street: she was arrested and charged with incitement to riot. She edited Freedom an anarchist-communist monthly newspaper from 1891 onwards and built a house at 999 Hammond Avenue, later North Troy Street (Note: While Jones writes North Troy Avenue, other sources such as the New York Times and Avrich use North Troy Street.) in Avondale. She was helped financially by the Pioneer Aid and Support Association, but some members of the group began to resent her need for funds, alleging that she was still claiming a stipend to support her daughter, who had died. Her relationship with Lacher was controversial since he remained married to someone else. Despite this the couple had begun to be seen together publicly until their relationship ended and they went to court. Parsons accused Lacher of attacking her household belongings with an axe. He admitted destroying the furniture but argued it was his and was fined $25 plus costs for disorderly conduct. He also alleged that he had written the majority of the Life of Albert R. Parsons. Parsons used her position as editor of Freedom to attack Lacher, claiming he had stolen money from a local group and was pursuing a vendetta against her.

As Parsons grew older, there were events to mark the anniversary of the Haymarket affair and the police continued to stop her addressing these and other meetings. When the anarchist Alexander Berkman attempted to assassinate the industrialist Henry Clay Frick in 1892, Parsons wrote in Freedom "For our part we have only the greatest admiration for a hero like Berkman" and she supported her friends Henry Bauer and Carl Nold who were arrested on conspiracy charges despite not being involved. Berkman was handed a sentence of 22 years and Nold and Bauer each received five years. In 1893, Parsons negotiated with the mayor that she could speak on the condition that she did not denounce him, then took the stage and immediately said the mayor was no better than a czar. In August 1896, her house burned down and her stock of books was damaged, although she later sold fire-damaged copies of Anarchism: Its Philosophy and Scientific Basis and The Life of Albert R. Parsons.

Parsons was attracted to the activism of the Social Democracy of America, led by Eugene V. Debs, and met Emma Goldman through the group in 1897. While Goldman promoted free love, emancipation for women and the freedom of the individual, Parsons (despite having extra-marital sex in her private life) publicly endorsed monogamy, marriage and motherhood, and she still believed in the primacy of the struggle of the working class as a whole. At the time Goldman, Parsons and Louise Michel were amongst a small cohort of women who were internationally famous as anarchists and labor activists. When Oscar Rotter wrote about free love and the destruction of property relations in the anarchist newspaper Free Society, Parsons responded angrily in support of monogamy and this led to a long-lasting feud with Goldman, who complained that Parsons was living off her executed partner's legacy. Parsons opposed both the Spanish–American War and the Philippine–American War; after her son Albert Jr. attempted to enlist, she had him committed to the Northern Illinois State Mental Hospital in 1899; he remained there for the rest of his life, dying in 1919 of tuberculosis.

== 1900s ==
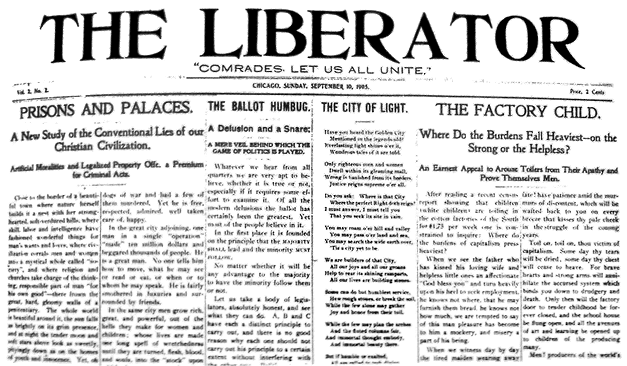
Front page of the September 10, 1905, edition of The Liberator

By 1900, Parsons was the Chicago correspondent for Free Society which had its printing press destroyed by the police following the assassination of President William McKinley. The same year, Parsons was visited by the anarchist Errico Malatesta and also made a speech alongside trade unionist Jay Fox at a picnic on Memorial Day. In 1905, Parsons set up the Industrial Workers of the World (IWW) with Eugene V. Debs, Bill Haywood and Mother Jones. She toured the US making speeches and selling pamphlets, at the same time editing the radical newspapers The Liberator and The Alarm. She was often prevented from speaking by the police, particularly in Chicago, yet she continued to lecture until the 1920s. In 1912, she hosted a meeting which set up the Syndicalist League of North America. It was led by William Z. Foster, who was staying with Parsons at the time. After Parsons spoke at a January 1915 hunger march in Chicago which ended in 1,500 unemployed people fighting with the police near Hull House on Halsted Street, she was arrested alongside Father Irwin St. John Tucker and 19 other people.

Following the Russian Revolution in 1917, Parsons moved towards communism. She later wrote to Carl Nold that the communists were "the only bunch who are making a vigorous protest against the present horrible conditions!" and lamented that "anarchism is a dead issue in American life today". She became involved with the International Labor Defense and in 1930, she spoke to thousands of people at the May Day (International Workers' Day) event at Ashland Auditorium in Chicago, making a speech that was reprinted in Hearings Before a Special Committee to Investigate Communist Activities in the US. In a continuance of their rivalry, Emma Goldman criticized her for jumping from one revolutionary cause to the next. Parsons finally joined the Communist Party in 1939.

Parsons suffered an attack of pleurisy in 1932, recovering enough to visit the Chicago World's Fair the following year. She was despondent about the US anarchist movement, discussing its perceived decline with friends such as Nord, yet she continued her activism, supporting challenges to miscarriage of justice in the cases regarding Angelo Herndon, Tom Mooney and the Scottsboro Boys. She went blind, received a pension and lived in poverty in Avondale at North Troy Street with a library of around 3,000 books which featured the work of French socialists, Victor Hugo, Jack London, Marx and Engels, Rousseau, Leo Tolstoy and Voltaire.

== Death ==
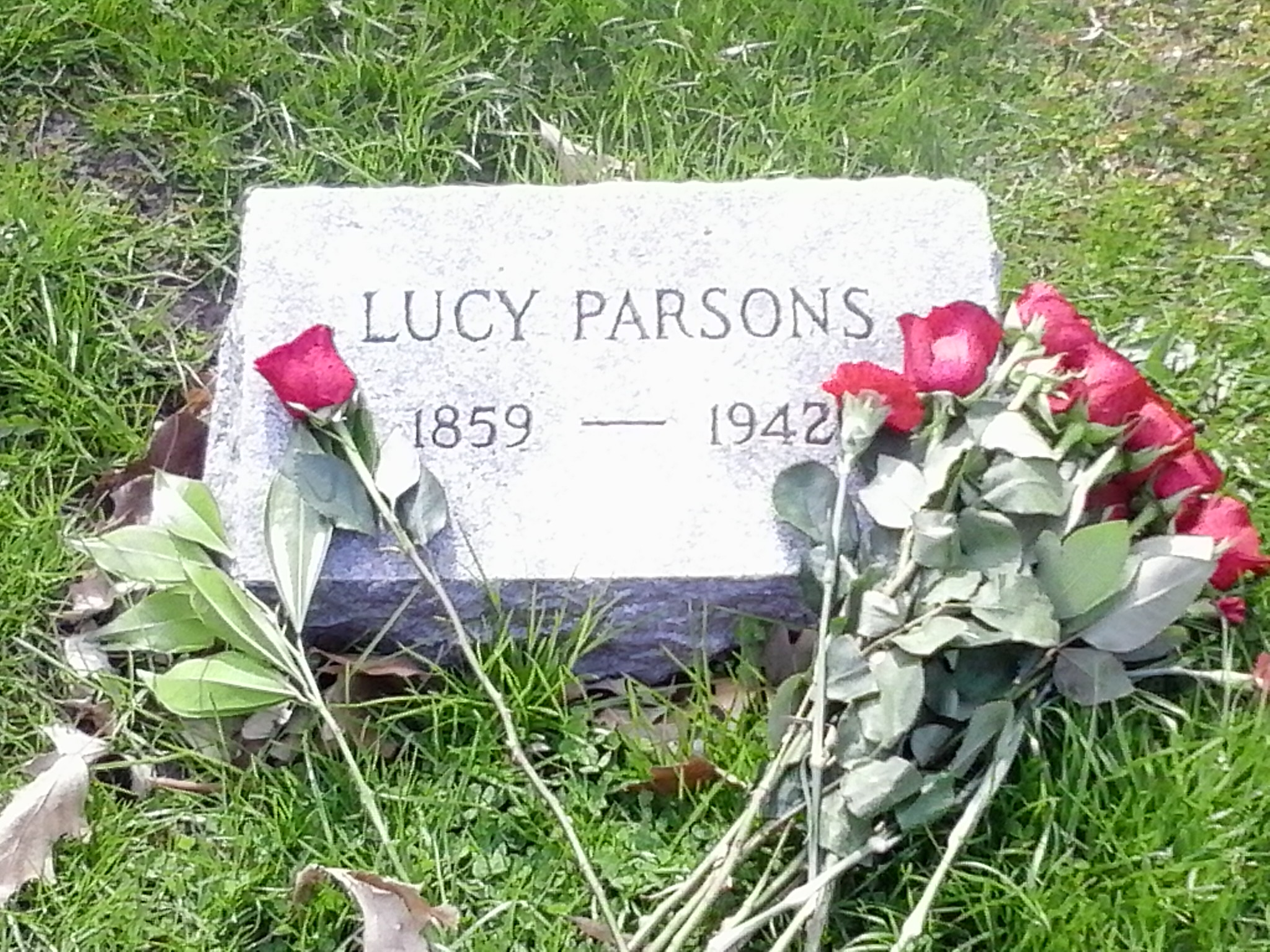
The grave of Parsons at the German Waldheim Cemetery in Forest Park, Illinois

On her last May Day in 1941, Parsons accompanied the Farm Equipment Workers' Organizing Committee as guest of honor. At the age of around 91, she died in a house fire on March 7, 1942. (Note: Ashbaugh writes that the fire was caused by a wood stove; the March 8, 1942, edition of the St. Petersburg Times reported neighbors saying it was caused by a basement water heater lit by Markstall before he went for a walk.) Her long-term partner George Markstall returned to find the building on fire and was unable to rescue her; he died of his injuries the next day. Parsons had spoken to Ben Reitman about her funeral and drawn up a will in 1938, leaving the house to Markstall and upon his death to the Pioneer Aid and Support Association. Her will was declared invalid, and the building was sold for $800 in 1943. The fire had destroyed part of her library, but many books remained undamaged; when a friend went to the house to save the books, he discovered that only burnt copies remained. He asked the police where the library had gone and was told the Federal Bureau of Investigation (FBI) had taken it. The FBI denied any knowledge of the books and when Reitman asked the head of the Chicago Red Squad, he was told the FBI had them; the books were not recovered. Years later, a signed copy of William Morris' The Signs of Change with the dedication "To Lucy E. Parsons, from William Morris, Nov. 15th 1888" was put up for sale, bearing stamps from the Library of Congress and the FBI.

A memorial service for Parsons and Markstall was attended by 300 people on March 12. Reitman spoke, calling her "the last of the dinosaurs, that brave group of Chicago Anarchists." Parsons was buried in the German Waldheim Cemetery in Forest Park, Illinois, next to the Haymarket Martyrs Monument where her husband is buried. Voltairine de Cleyre, Emma Goldman, and many other activists are also buried there.

== Legacy ==
Parsons' fellow activist Elizabeth Gurley Flynn remembered her as a passionate speaker and revolutionary. The philosopher Ruth Kinna noted in her 2020 book Great Anarchists that Parsons has historically been referred to primarily as the wife of Albert Parsons, yet she was in fact a "talented writer, orator and organizer in her own right". Until Ashbaugh's 1976 biography, Parsons was often only mentioned in footnotes: more recently coverage of her career has increased. She has been claimed by various left-wing groups as a figurehead and a self-managed social center in Boston was named after her.

Historians such as Gale Ahrens, Mary Condé and Robin Kelley have criticised Parsons' lack of interest in the struggles of African Americans, with her stance reflecting a belief in the need for the working class generally to rise up against its employers, rather than appealing to the need for racial equality. One explanation is that since she denied her own black heritage, she focused more on class struggle. As a result, she did not work with the contemporaneous black Chicago activist Ida Wells-Barnett, nor the National Association of Colored Women and the National Association for the Advancement of Colored People. Historians have also focused on the question of Parsons' specific political affiliations, while at the time labels were more fluid and Albert Parsons wrote: "We are called by some Communists, or Socialists, or Anarchists. We accept all three of the terms."

A historical marker dedicated to Parsons and her husband was erected in 1997 by the City of Chicago at the location of their home, 1908 North Mohawk Street, in the Old Town neighborhood. The Chicago Park District named a small area on Belmont Avenue the "Lucy Ella Gonzales Parsons" park in 2004, a decision which was opposed by the Fraternal Order of Police. In 2022, a new housing development in Logan Square, Chicago with 100 percent affordable units was named the Lucy Gonzalez Parsons Apartments.

== Selected works ==
- Parsons, Lucy E. (2004). Ahrens, Gale (ed.). Lucy Parsons: Freedom, equality and solidarity – writings and speeches, 1878–1937. Chicago: Charles H. Kerr. ISBN 978-0882863009.
- Parsons, Lucy E., ed. (1910). The famous speeches of the eight Chicago anarchists in court: When asked if they had anything to say why sentence of death should not be passed upon them - October 7, 8, and 9, 1886. Chicago: Lucy E. Parsons. OCLC 21042544.
- Parsons, Lucy; Parsons, Albert R. (1889). Life of Albert R. Parsons, with brief history of the labor movement in America. Chicago: L.E. Parsons. OCLC 1048339877.
