= De Moker =

Dutch anarchist newspaper

- Named after: The sledgehammer
- Predecessor: Alarm
- Formation: 1923; 103 years ago
- Founders: Herman Schuurman; Anton Constandse; Emily van Bilderbeek
- Dissolved: 1928; 98 years ago
- Origins: Anarchism
- Members: 500 (1920s)
- Official language: Dutch
- Main organ: De Moker

De Moker (English; The Sledgehammer) was a Dutch anarchist group that edited a newspaper under the same name. The newspaper appeared between the end of 1923 and the summer of 1928, with 3000–4000 copies printed an issue. It was subtitled Opruiend Blad Voor Jonge Arbeiders (Agitation Newspaper for Young Workers).

Due to the editors' anti-state and anti-militarist views, they often had problems with the police, as when Rinus van de Brink was imprisoned for 2 months for an October 1924 article against military service. The opinions expressed in the paper were also critical of the pacifist wing of the antimilitarist movement, the current of the anarchist movement associated with Domela Nieuwenhuis, labor unions, and the Soviet Union.

De Moker was co-founded by members of the circle that had formed around the earlier Dutch anarchist newspaper, Alarm, including Herman Schuurman, Anton Constandse, and Emily van Bilderbeek. The group was informal, consisting of about 500 youth organized in affinity groups carrying out autonomous activity and meeting three times a year. Many participants were also members of the Social-Anarchistiche Jeugd Organisaties (Social Anarchist Youth Organizations) and the Internationale Anti-Militaristische Vereniging (International Anti-Militarist Union). With Alarm and Arthur Lehning's work, De Moker reinvigorated anarchist thought in the 1920s and 1930s.

After the group's end, many participants remained active in the anarchist, antimilitarist, and Freethinkers movements. Many of them participated in the partisan resistance against the Nazi occupation during the Second World War, hiding Jews or carrying out acts of sabotage. Some of them, such as Jo de Haas, were executed by the Nazis, while others survived and remained active in the following decades.

== See also ==
- List of anarchist periodicals
