= Anton Constandse =

Dutch author and journalist

Anton L. Constandse
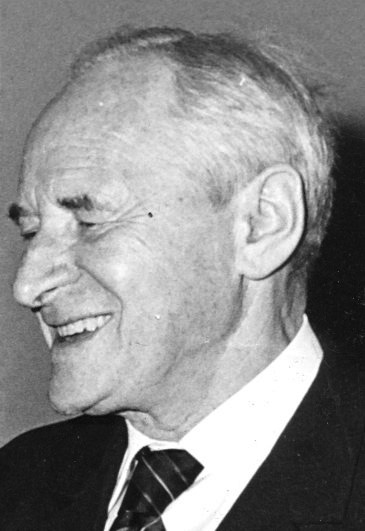
- Born: September 13, 1899; Brouwershaven
- Died: March 23, 1985 (aged 85); The Hague
- Other names: Dr. A. Elsée, G. Hamer, Pol de Beer, F.C.O., C.G.G., G.L.
- Education: University of Amsterdam
- Occupations: Journalist, author

Anton Levien Constandse (September 13, 1899 – March 23, 1985) was a Dutch anarchist author and journalist.

== Biography ==
The son of a Baptist hotelier, Constandse completed the normal school between 1914 and 1918 and in this period came into contact with the teetotalers' movement. In response to World War I, he developed anti-militarist ideas. He joined the Social-Anarchist Youth Organisation (Dutch Sociaal-Anarchistische Jeugd Organisatie, SAJO) in 1919. Within this organisation, he chose the side of the individualist faction when factional struggles erupted, denouncing even trade organizations as counterrevolutionary. Instead of taking a job as a teacher, Constandse devoted himself to spreading anarchist ideas. He published two anarchist monthlies, Alarm (1922–1926) and Opstand ("Revolt", 1926–1928), which together with Herman Schuurman's De Moker and Arthur Lehning's Grondslagen renewed the theoretical basis of Dutch anarchism. Constandse's 1927 call for mutiny in De Vrije Socialist ("the free socialist"), following the sending of HNLMS Sumatra to Shanghai, led to a conviction for sedition and a prison sentence of two months.

During the 1930, Constandse focused on combating fascism. The rise of Adolf Hitler in Germany led Constandse to drop his antimilitarist ideas. He considered the Spanish Civil War a last chance for anarchist revolution and abandoned revolutionary anarchism after the war had been lost by the Republican forces, instead laying down a Reichian theory of fascism's success as stemming from the proletariat's desire for a strict father figure. Having married, he also successfully studied for a position as a French teacher, but was barred from such a position by a 1933 law that prohibited schools from hiring members of leftist organisations.

On 7 October 1940, the German occupation force had Constandse arrested and sent to the concentration camps; he was at Buchenwald for thirteen months, followed by a string of smaller concentration camps including Kamp Sint-Michielsgestel, ending with Kamp Vught. In September 1944 this camp was evicted, and Constandse was freed. He spent the "hunger winter" of 1944 in The Hague.

After the war, Constandse was hired as a journalist by Algemeen Handelsblad editor D.J. von Balluseck, whom he had met in captivity. He came to lead the newspaper's foreign desk, espousing views that ran counter to the Cold War ideology of the time, criticizing both Soviet and US policies as detrimental to world peace. A 1956 editorial in which Constandse argued against Western intervention in the Hungarian Uprising, for fear that it would lead to nuclear war, even caused a scuffle at the paper's news desk. Constandse remained on the Handelsblad's editorial board until retiring in 1964. During the same period, he edited the Dutch Society for Sexual Reform's magazine.

After retirement, he continued writing for De Groene Amsterdammer and Vrij Nederland, as well as making radio programs for the VPRO and lecturing on Spanish and Latin American history at the University of Amsterdam. In the cultural upheavals of the 1960s, Constandse became an example to many of the rebellious new generation, and he reformulated his anarchist ideals as a reformist cultural movement rather than a politically revolutionary ideology. From 1973 he also edited the anarchist magazine De AS.

== See also ==
- Anarchism in the Netherlands
