= Oscar Rotter =

Oscar Rotter (born 21 July, 1865), also with the German spelling Oskar Rotter, was a German-born New York physician and proponent of free love and contraception. Rotter's books included The Sexes and Love in Freedom and Jealousy, the Foe of Freedom, and he published articles on free love, rebutting the views of Lucy Parsons. Rotter was also a driving force in the medico-economic movement, an early effort to address the economic pressures on the medical profession and pharmaceutical industry.

== Life and career ==
Rotter was born in Landeck, Silesia, Germany. He was educated at the Royal St. Matthias Gymnasium in Breslau. After immigrating to the United States, he graduated from New York University Medical College in 1891 and earned a doctor of medicine degree.

He was secretary of the Federation of the Medical Economic Leagues; chairman of the committee on Economic Research in Yorkville Medical Society; associate editor of The Medical Economist; and local medical examiner for the Tribe of Ben-Hur. His memberships in professional organizations included the Yorkville Medical Society, Yorkville Physicians Economic League, Association for Culture and the Sunrise Club. Rotter was also named honorary member of the New York County Pharmaceutical Society.

He is probably the Oscar Rotter who was executive surgeon for the East Side Clinic for Children, 325 E. 84th Street in New York.

== Writings ==
- "The Economic Problem as It Affects the Medical Profession" was a paper Rotter presented at a meeting of the New York County Pharmaceutical Society in 1912. Rotter outlined and distinguished the rights of physicians and pharmacists as they related to each other. During the discussion that followed, one participant maintained that "druggists should not give customers information what ailments the prescriptions are for when so asked." The paper was also published in The Medico-Pharmaceutical Critic and Guide (January 1912), pp. 22–26 online.
- An Attempt to Cope with the Economic Problem within the Practice of Medicine
- "Some Remarks on the Medico-Economic Movement"
- "The Medico-Economic Movement: Its Recent Organization and Activity," American Medicine 19 (1913) 316–318 online.
- "The Medico-Economic Movement in Greater New York," Southern California Practitioner 29 (1914), p. 65 online.
- "Causes, History and Achievement of the Medico-Economic Movement"
- "The Mutual Economic Relationship between Physician and Pharmacist," The Practical Druggist (March 1912), pp. 56, 58, full text online.
- "Means of Preventing Conception," Medical World 15 (1897), pp. 151–152 online.
- The Sexes and Love in Freedom
- Jealousy, the Foe of Freedom
