= Fernando Tarrida del Mármol =

Cuban–Catalan mathematician and anarchist (1861–1915)

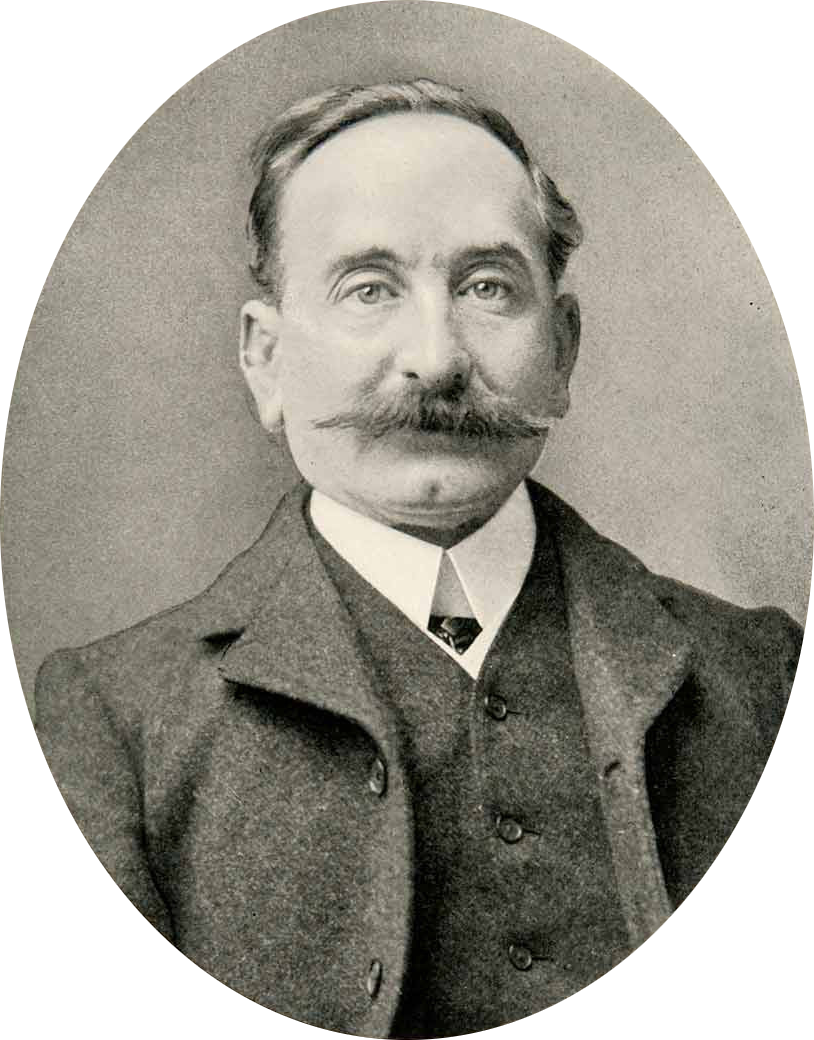
- Fernando Tarrida del Mármol
- Born: 2 August 1861; Havana, Cuba, Spanish Empire
- Died: 14 March 1915 (aged 53); London, England
- Education: University of Barcelona
- Occupation: Mathematician
- Era: Restoration
- Known for: Anarchism without adjectives
- Movement: Anarchism in Spain

Fernando Tarrida del Mármol (2 August 1861 – 14 March 1915) was a mathematics professor born in Cuba and raised in Catalonia best known for proposing "anarchism without adjectives", the idea that anarchists should set aside their debates over the most preferable economic systems and acknowledge their commonality in ultimate aims.

== Early life and career ==
Fernando Tarrida del Mármol was born in 1861 in Cuba, son to Juan Tarrida, a merchant from Sitges, and Margarita Mármol, sister to the future Cuban insurgent leader Donato Mármol. His father became a prominent businessman in Santiago de Cuba, being the founder of the Spanish Circle in that city in January 1869. Following the death of Margarita, Juan Tarrida moved back to Spain in 1873, establishing shoe and boot manufacturing plant in the Catalan town of Sitges. Tarrida received a degree in mathematics from the Pau lycée, in southern France. His classmate and later French prime minister Louis Barthou converted him to republicanism. Tarrida moved to the University of Barcelona for a degree in civil engineering, and became a professor of mathematics at Barcelona's Polytechnic.

Despite his family's wealth, he identified more closely with Barcelona's working class and visited their clubs to discuss politics and quality of life. The workers appreciated his charisma and sincerity. By the mid-1880s—Tarrida's twenties—he was a collectivist anarchist who identified with the federalism of Pierre-Joseph Proudhon and Francesc Pi i Margall. Tarrida viewed anarchism beyond political philosophy as an all-encompassing philosophy, or the process by which humanity integrates and develops. He often referred to anarchism in mathematical formula as both the language to clarify his thoughts and to scientifically prove the philosophy's tenets. Tarrida gave public lectures and wrote about anarchism for libertarian journals, and developed a friendship with the Spanish anarchist Anselmo Lorenzo. Barcelona workers chose Tarrida as their delegate to the International Socialist Congress in Paris, 1889.

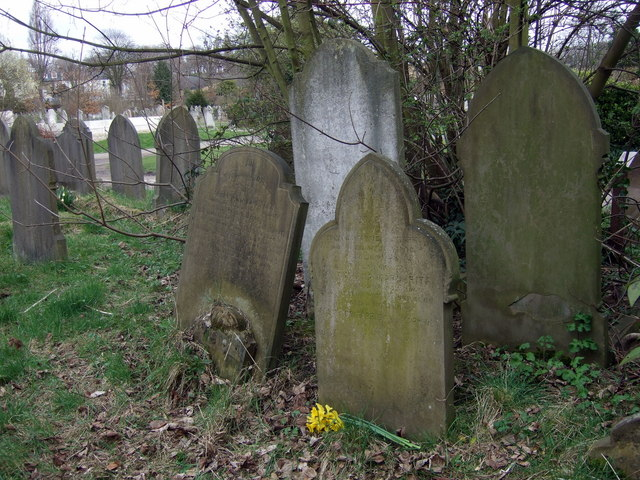
Fernando Tarrida del Mármol gravestone, Ladywell Cemetery London UK

Tarrida first proposed the idea of "anarchism without adjectives" during a public speech in November 1889. Anarchists often debated their ideal economic conditions, and "anarchism without adjectives" appealed anarchists to abandon these divisions, accommodate other factions, follow the basic principles of anarchism, and instead work together towards their unified cause. He argued that anarchists share opposition to dogma and should therefore let each other freely choose their choice of economic system. Put another way, anarchism was "the axiom" and their economic model was "secondary". Tarrida gave this speech at the Bellas Artes palace as a representative of an affinity group in commemoration of the Chicago Haymarket affair two years prior. Tarrida, himself, did not publicly engage in the factionism between collectivism and communism, though his earlier works adopted a collectivist position. In 1890, the French anarcho-communist journal Le Révolté charged the Spanish anarchist movement as overly collectivist and prone to authoritarian organization. The journal challenged Tarrida to defend his position, and in an open letter, he affirmed their differences in tactics but agreement in ultimate goal. He defended the Spanish anarchist model of forming alliances between groups, and criticized the French anarchists' puritanical rigidity as ineffectual against the centralized bourgeoisie in the absence of coordinated action. Tarrida also noted the difference between the development of Spanish and French anarchism. While the French called the Spanish workers' associations authoritarian, Tarrida wrote that these organizations were responsible for building the anarchist tradition in Spain and contributed to their workers' natural rejection of communist worker models.

Tarrida was held during the 1896 Montjuïc trial, in which the Spanish government oversaw the torture of Spanish anarchists and laborers. Deported at its conclusion, Tarrida wrote Les inquisiteurs d'Espagne (Montjuich, Cuba, Philippines), which was influential in spreading news of the Montjuïc events and Spanish association with barbarism widely.
