= Abolishing the Borders from Below =

- Type: Political philosophy
- Format: Bimonthly magazine
- Founded: 2001
- Ceased publication: 2010
- Political alignment: Anarchism
- Language: English
- Headquarters: Berlin
- Website: Official website

Abolishing The Borders From Below was an anarchist magazine published by a Berlin-based collective from 2001 until 2010. It was formed by a handful of Central and Eastern European and ex-Soviet migrant anarchists and political and counter-cultural anti-authoritarians.

The bi-monthly magazine was filled with articles from correspondents around Central and Eastern Europe and consisted of information about different political and cultural processes and activities in the region seen, commented on and analysed from an anarchist perspective.

It was printed regularly and distributed around the globe by Central and Eastern Europe contributors and by Active Distribution, from South Africa to the Philippines. The magazine folded in 2010.
