= Lu Jianbo =

Chinese professor and anarchist

- 盧劍波
- Born: Lu Tingjie (盧廷傑); July 3, 1904; Jiangjin, Hejiang County, Luzhou, Sichuan Province, Qing Empire
- Died: December 8, 1991 (aged 87)
- Education: Shanghai National University
- Spouse: Deng Tianyu

Lu Tingjie (simplified Chinese: 卢廷杰; traditional Chinese: 盧廷傑; pinyin: Lú Tíngjié; 3 July 1904 – 8 December 1991), better known as Lu Jianbo (simplified Chinese: 卢剑波; traditional Chinese: 盧劍波; pinyin: Lú Jiànbō), was a Chinese anarchist, Esperantist, and professor of history at Sichuan University.

== Biography ==
On July 3, 1904, Lu was born in Jiangjin, Hejiang County, Luzhou, Sichuan Province. He attended Sichuan Hejiang Middle School and later became the head of the Student Union of the school. Influenced by the May Fourth Movement and the New Culture Movement, Lu was introduced to anarchism and Esperanto during his middle school years. Inspired by a young teacher at the school, Lu Jianbo learned about the October Revolution and wanted to study in Soviet Russia. 1921, Lu Jianbo took three silver dollars from his family and went to Chongqing to see Chen Xiaomei at the Chongqing United County High School, but was told that he could no longer go north.

In 1922, Lu Jianbo transferred to the Chuannan Normal School in Lu County, and in May, he attempted to use the Chuannan Circuit Military and Police School Movement to run a publication to promote anarchism. He got discovered and was arrested and sentenced to death with immediate effect on the charge of conspiring to incite mutiny. On the way to the execution, Wang Zuanxu reported the case to Sichuan warlord Yang Sen, who stopped the sentence and sentenced him to confinement for education. Yang Sen sent a message to Lu Jianbo, saying: "You are so young, but you have such courage; if you 'change your ways', you will certainly build a successful career for the country in the future". Lu Zuofu, the director of the Department of Education and the president of the Chuannan Daily Newspaper, released Lu Jianbo from prison on bail. After his release, he was admitted to the First High School of Jiangsu Province, and during the same period, he founded publications such as People's Vanguard (民锋) and Black Waves (黑澜), and met with Ba Jin for the first time. In 1925, Lu Jianbo came to Shanghai and was admitted to the Shanghai National University in 1926, where he organized the People's Vanguard Society, the Federation of Young Chinese Anarcho-communists, and the Society for the Study of Syndicalism during his school years, graduating in 1928. Lu had to leave Shanghai that same year because he criticized the cooperation between Chinese anarchists and the Kuomintang.

In 1931, Lu returned to Sichuan to recuperate, and then taught there for a long time. Shortly thereafter, Lu Jianbo, Wu Xianwu, and Zhang Liangqing organized and launched the Chengdu Esperanto Society, of which Lu was the president, and edited publications such as Chongjing and Jingzhe. In 1944, Lu began to give lectures at Sichuan University, and in 1960 he was elected chairman of the trade union of the university, and later became a professor of the history department of Sichuan University.

He died on December 8, 1991.

== Personal life ==
He and Deng Tianyu became partners in the 1920s, but the pair never formally married, partly because they both subscribed to Emma Goldman's theories.
