= De AS =

Dutch anarchist publication

De Anarcho-Socialist
- Type: Quartlerly
- Editor: Anton Constandse
- Founded: 1972
- Ceased publication: 2020
- Language: Dutch
- Country: Holland

De AS (Anarcho-Socialist) (also called De AS) was a Dutch anarchist quarterly, published by De AS Foundation in Moerkapelle. The first issue appeared in December 1972.

De AS appears in the form of special issues and once per year in the form of a Yearbook Anarchism. Sometimes, these two appear together, as is the case with number 156 (Winter 2006). Sometimes there are also double numbers. The themes followed by the 13th Yearbook Anarchism concern uprooting of Europe. The aim of De AS is to develop an anarchist vision regarding the social environment (from politics to art) as well a critique of the point of view of anarchism.

From 1973 to 1983, Anton Levien Constandse served as an editor for the magazine. As of May 2009, Marius de Geus, Jaap van der Laan, Wim de Lobel and Hans Ramaer edited the magazine.
