= Archives Bakounine =

Series of Mikhail Bakunin's complete works (published 1961–1982)

- Editor: Arthur Lehning
- Subject: Anthology
- Publisher: Brill
- Publication date: 1961–1982

Archives Bakounine is a seven-volume series of Mikhail Bakunin's complete works, edited by Arthur Lehning and published between 1961 and 1982.

== Contents ==
- Volume 1, part 1: Michel Bakounine et l'Italie (1871–1872): La polémique avec Mazzini, 1961
- Volume 1, part 2: Michel Bakounine et l'Italie (1871–1872): La Première Internationale en Italie et le Conflit avec Marx, 1963
- Volume 2: Michel Bakounine et les Conflits dans L'Internationale, 1872, 1965
- Volume 3: Étatisme et Anarchie, 1967
- Volume 4: Michel Bakounine et ses relations avec Sergej Nečaev (1870–1872), 1971
- Volume 5: Michel Bakounine et ses relations slaves, 1870–1875, 1974
- Volume 6: Michel Bakounine sur la guerre franco-allemande et la Révolution sociale en France, 1870–1871, 1977
- Volume 7: L'Empire knouto-germanique et la Révolution sociale, 1870–1871, 1982
