= George A. Schilling =

George A. Schilling (1850 in Baden - 1936) was a prominent American union leader and Georgist in the late nineteenth century. He was also active in Anarchist circles. From 1865 to the 1890s, Schilling worked in Chicago for the Arbeiter Zeitung, a German-language newspaper with socialist (and later, anarchist) leanings. He made his mark in the Chicago labor movement as a member of the cooper's union and a leader of the Knights of Labor. In 1886, he was a prominent supporter of the Labor Party in Illinois. In 1886, the Labor Party endorsed John Altgeld for a judgeship, which Altgeld won.

In 1892, Schilling endorsed Altgeld in a successful race for Governor of Illinois. In 1893, he was appointed by Governor Altgeld as secretary on the State Board of Labor Commissioners, and in 1903 he was appointed by Altgeld to the Chicago Board of Local Improvements.

In 1919 Schilling was a signatory to the call to establish the Committee of 48, a liberal political organization which sought to establish a third party in America between the ideological poles of reaction on the one hand and revolution on the other.
