= The Alarm (newspaper) =

Nameplate of The Alarm, Chicago anarchist newspaper issued from 1884 to 1886 under the editorship of Albert Parsons. After having been suppressed by law enforcement authorities, the paper reemerged briefly in 1887 and 1888 with Dyer D. Lum manning the editorial chair.

The Alarm was an anarchist newspaper published in the American city of Chicago during the 1880s. The weekly was the most prominent English-language anarchist periodical of its day. The paper was famously edited by Albert Parsons, who was controversially tried and executed in response to the Haymarket affair of 1886.

== Publication history ==
=== Establishment ===
Albert Parsons, editor of The Alarm, was among those executed in retaliation for a fatal anarchist bombing in Chicago on May 4, 1886.

The first issue of The Alarm appeared on October 4, 1884 in Chicago, Illinois as the weekly voice of the International Working People's Association (IWPA). At the time of its launch The Alarm was one of eight newspapers in the United States to declare their allegiance to the anarchist IWPA — and the only paper published in English.

Editor of the paper was the Southern-born Albert R. Parsons, formerly the assistant editor of the English-language weekly of the Socialist Labor Party of America, The Socialist. Parsons had first come north from Texas in 1873 to take a job as a printer for the Chicago Inter-Ocean before moving to a more steady job in a similar capacity working for the Chicago Times.

A pioneer member of the American Typographical Union (most likely a synonym for the International Typographical Union) as well as the Knights of Labor, the gifted orator Parsons soon emerged as among the leading English-speaking radical trade unionist in the city of Chicago, a position even more firmly established with the launch of The Alarm.

=== Development ===
Of the eight newspapers affiliated nationwide with the IWPA, five were published in Chicago alone. Joining The Alarm as Chicago-based IWPA publications were the German-language daily Arbeiter-Zeitung (Workers' Newspaper) and weeklies Der Vorbote (The Harbinger) and Der Fackel (The Torch), as well as the Czech-language weekly Budoucnost (The Future). The paper claimed a circulation of 3,000 during the first part of 1886 — a figure well exceeded by its non-English compatriots. By way of comparison, the Arbeiter-Zeitung maintained a circulation of between 5,000 and 6,000 in the same period, while the Vorbote ranged between 7,000 and 8,000. Der Fackel was the largest publication yet, with an 1886 circulation topping the 12,000 mark.

While The Alarm was Albert Parsons' paper, he was assisted in its production by Lizzie M. Holmes, who wrote variously under the pseudonym "May Huntley," as well as under her maiden name, "Lizzie M. Swank." Other contributors of written material included his activist wife Lucy Parsons, C.S. Griffin, and Dyer D. Lum.

The paper's finances were tenuous throughout its existence. Financing came in the form of a publishing society which sold benefactors "shares" of the paper in addition to a stream of fundraisers, including picnics and benefit evenings.

=== Ideology ===
The Alarm styled itself as the official English-language voice of the International Working People's Association and very frequently reprinted the political platform of the IWPA in its pages. The paper inceasingly railed against private ownership of productive capital and the system of wage labor — depicted as the root cause of a wide range of social maladies. The paper consistently argued that the state was a mechanism for the perpetuation of this unjust social order as well as an instrument for the suppression of individual political liberty.

Parsons and his co-thinkers proclaimed as their task the destruction of private property in the means of production. If this were to be eliminated, it was argued, social ills such as poverty, crime, and war would fall away in tandem with the collapse of the old economic order.

Physical force would be necessary to bring about this destruction of the old order, in the view of Parsons and The Alarm. Propaganda of the deed would inspire a revolutionary upsurge of the impoverished majority against their opulent masters, the anarchists believed. The Alarm advised:

"Workingmen of America, learn the manufacture and use of dynamite. It will be your most powerful weapon; a weapon of the weak against the strong.... Then use it unstintingly, unsparingly. The battle for bread is the battle for life.... Death and destruction to the system and its upholders, which plunders and enslaves the men, women, and children of toil."

The Alarm's advocacy of the use of explosives as a tool for social change was not limited to abstract discussion. Practical advice in the manufacture and use of dynamite, nitroglycerine, and explosive devices, including such articles as a piece on bomb-making entitled "The Weapon of the Social Revolutionist Placed Within the Reach of All," and another on the creation of dynamite in home laboratories, "A Practical Lesson on Popular Chemistry: The Manufacture of Dynamite Made Easy."

This political orientation and practical advocacy would make the paper itself a target in the aftermath of a fatal bombing in Chicago on May 4, 1886, remembered to history as the "Haymarket affair."

=== Suppression ===
The Alarm was suppressed on May 4, 1886, a period during which Albert Parsons was still in hiding prior to his voluntary surrender to the Chicago police for trial in the Haymarket affair. The last edition of the paper to see print under Parsons' editorship was dated April 24 of that year.

=== Re-launch and demise ===
On November 5, 1887, just one week before Parson's execution by hanging in connection with the Haymarket bombing, political activist and editorial contributor Dyer D. Lum relaunched The Alarm, beginning the numbering system fresh as "Volume 1, Number 1." Lum managed to continue the paper without interruption until April 22, 1888, at which time publication was temporarily suspended. A restart was made on June 16, 1888, but the effort proved short-lived and The Alarm was terminated in February 1889.

=== Legacy ===
The Alarm is available to scholars and activists on microfilm, with the master negative being held by the Abraham Lincoln Presidential Library in Springfield, Illinois.

== Articles ==
- Lucy E. Parsons, "A Word to Tramps," The Alarm, vol. 1, no. 1 (Oct. 4, 1884), pg. 1.
- Albert R. Parsons, "Equal Rights," The Alarm [Chicago], vol. 1, no. 7 (Nov. 15, 1884), pg. 2.
