= Arthur Lehning =

Dutch anarchist writer (1899–2000)

- Born: Paul Arthur Müller-Lehning; 23 October 1899; Utrecht, Netherlands
- Died: 1 January 2000 (aged 100); Lys-Saint-Georges, French Fifth Republic
- Occupation: Writer
- Movement: Anarchism
- Awards: Bijzondere prijs; Gouden Ganzenveer; P. C. Hooft Award

Paul Arthur Müller-Lehning (23 October 1899 – 1 January 2000) was a Dutch author, historian and anarchist.

== Biography ==
Arthur Lehning was born in the Dutch city of Utrecht on 23 October 1899. He studied in Berlin, where he was first introduced to anarchism and became involved in prisoner support activism, aiding anarchist political prisoners in the nascent Soviet Union. In 1922, he joined the International Anti-Militarist Bureau (IAMB) and the International Workers' Association (IWA), within which he advanced the proposal of using a general strike as a means to end wars. In 1927, he joined the press service of the International Anti-Militarist Commission, which resulted from a collaboration between the IAMB and IWA. He also published the i10 art magazine, which drew contributions from numerous prominent artists.

Lehning was appointed as secretary of the IWA in 1932 and served in this post until 1935. The following year, he travelled to Spain to witness the Spanish Revolution of 1936. At the outbreak of World War II, he oversaw the transfer of the archives of the International Institute of Social History (IISG) from Amsterdam to Oxford, where they remained until the liberation of the Netherlands in 1945. Over the 1960s and 1970s, he edited the collected works of Mikhail Bakunin.

Lehnin died in France on 1 January 2000.

== See also ==
- Archives Bakounine
- Anarchism in the Netherlands
- Anton Constandse

== Bibliography ==
- Enckell, Marianne (12 August 2020) [25 March 2014]. "LEHNING Arthur [Müller Lehning]". Dictionnaire des anarchistes (in French).
- Heath, Nick (22 September 2004). "Lehning, Arthur, 1899–2000". Libcom.org.
- Huber, Stephanie (March 2024). "Arthur Müller-Lehning". The Modern Art Index Project. Metropolitan Museum of Art. doi:10.57011/USRL3080.
