= Schwarzer Faden =

Quarterly anarchist magazine

- Categories: Anarchist magazine
- Frequency: Quarterly
- First issue: May 1980
- Final issue: July 2004
- Language: German
- ISSN: 0722-8988

Schwarzer Faden was a quarterly anarchist magazine published between 1980 and 2004.
