= Jingzhe (newspaper) =

1930s Chinese newspaper published in Chengdu

Jingzhe (traditional Chinese: 驚蟄, translated to English as both Spring Festival and Awakening from Hibernation) was a Chinese newspaper, published in Chengdu in the late 1930s. It was one of the last public expressions of the anarchism in China, one of several journals published by Chinese anarchists during the period but the only such to have a clear anarchist identity and position. Anarchism in China was previously a minor but influential ideology during the last years of the Qing dynasty, both in South China and among the Overseas Chinese, but with the eruption of the Chinese Civil War the anarchist movement declined heavily. It was frequently suppressed by the Chinese Communist Party and the Kuomintang.

The newspaper – which shared its name with another anarchist publication, based in Guangzhou during the early 1920s – was founded in 1937, after the Second Sino-Japanese War reached a state of total warfare following years of conflict. It was formed by Lu Jianbo and other anarchist intellectuals in the region of Sichuan, as the Empire of Japan forced the Kuomintang government of Chiang Kai-shek and its forces to move deeper and deeper into China. With this, the city of Chengdu was turned into an important industrial, cultural and above all military centre, facing frequent bombardment from the Imperial Japanese Army Air Service.

Unlike many other contemporary anarchists, who often rejected war on class-based grounds, Jingzhe instead chose to involve itself in the "War of Resistance", supporting it as a war against oppression and advocating popular mobilization on the side of the anti-Japanese forces. This went as far as "rehabilitating" Peter Kropotkin in an October 1938 issue. Kropotkin, a prominent anarchist theorist, had been accused by many others of betraying the working class and his anarchist principles by signing the Manifesto of the Sixteen, taking a pro-war, pro-Allied position in World War I. The newspaper extensively covered the Spanish Civil War, ongoing at the time, providing news and translations of texts by Spanish anarchists. Among the contributors was the prolific writer Ba Jin, who – reconciled with Lu Jianbo after a previous fallout – wrote an article about Buenaventura Durruti, a prominent Spanish anarchist killed in 1936. He also argued in the newspaper in favour of a popular front along the Spanish line, uniting socialists, communists, anarchists and anti-fascists in the struggle against the Japanese invasion.

With the intensity of the war heightening, and World War II breaking out, Jingzhe eventually went out of publication in 1940.

== See also ==
- Second United Front
- Spanish Revolution
- Wang Jingwei
