= Alzina Stevens =

American journalist (1849–1900)

Alzina Parsons Stevens
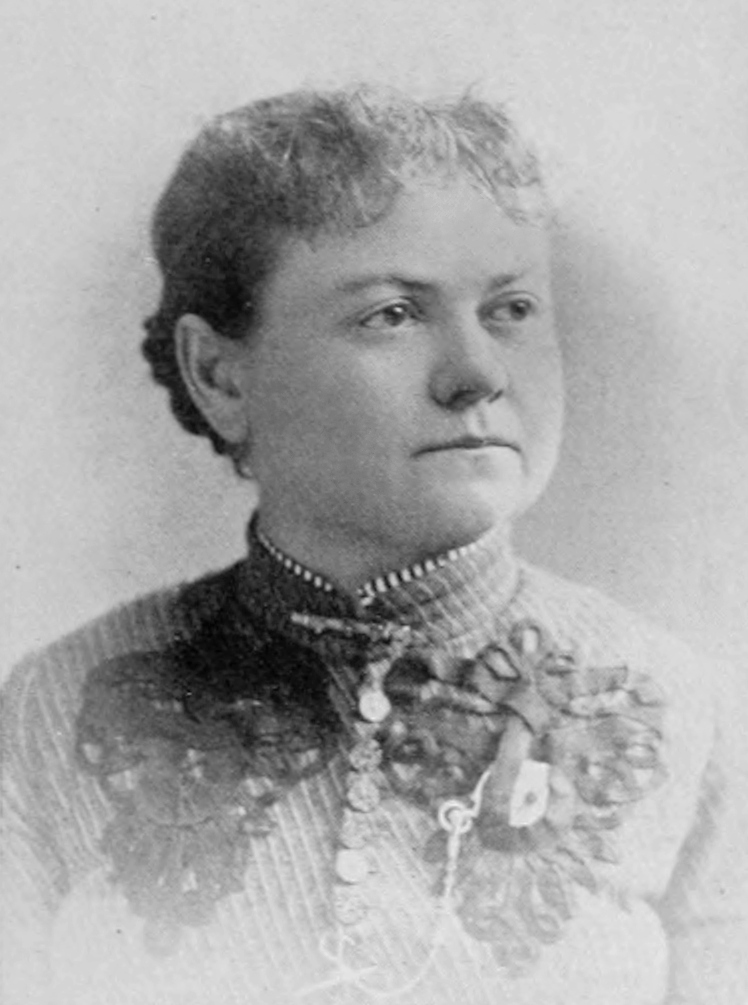
- "A Woman of the Century"
- Born: Alzina Parsons; May 27, 1849; Parsonsfield, Maine, U.S.
- Died: June 3, 1900 (aged 51)
- Occupations: labor leader, social reformer, editor
- Spouse: Mr. Stevens (m. 1876)
- Writing career
- Language: English

Alzina Stevens (May 27, 1849 – June 3, 1900) was an American labor leader, social reformer, and editor, active in Hull House in Chicago. She was one of the representative women in the order of the Knights of Labor and an ardent advocate of equal suffrage. She served on the editorial staff of the Toledo Bee and was half owner and editor of the Vanguard, an organ of the People's Party. Although her marriage to Mr. Stevens in 1876 or 1877, ended in divorce soon after, she kept her husband's surname.

== Early years and education ==
Alzina Ann Parsons was born in Parsonsfield, Maine May 27, 1849. Her parents were Enoch Parsons and Louise Page. The father was a soldier in the War of 1812, while her two brothers served in the American Civil War in the 7th New Hampshire Volunteer Infantry. Her grandfather was Colonel Thomas Parsons, who commanded a Massachusetts regiment in the Continental Army during the American Revolutionary War.

At the age of 13, she began self-support as a weaver in a cotton factory, where she lost her right index finger in an accident. Stevens saw her missing finger as a constant reminder of the need to improve working conditions and regulate child labour. She attended high school in Somersworth, New Hampshire.

== Career ==
In 1867, Stevens moved to Chicago and found work in the printing trade, serving as a typesetter, compositor, proofreader, correspondent, and editor.

Stevens became active in the trade unions, notably as one of the leaders of the Knights of Labor in Chicago. In 1877, she organized the Working Woman's Union, No. 1, of Chicago, and was its first president. Removing from that city to Toledo, Ohio, she threw herself into the movement there and was soon one of the leading forces of the Knights of Labor. She was again instrumental in organizing a woman's society, the Joan of Arc Assembly Knights of Labor, and was its first master workman and a delegate from that body to the district assembly. In the district, she was zealous and energetic, serving as a member of the executive board, organizer, judge, and for a number of years, recording and financial secretary. In 1890, she was elected district master workman, becoming the chief officer of a district of 22 local assemblies of knights. She represented the district in the general assemblies of the order in the conventions held in Atlanta, Georgia, Denver, Colorado, Indianapolis, Indiana, and Toledo, Ohio.

In 1892, Stevens became a resident of Hull House where she joined other social reformers such as Jane Addams, Ellen Gates Starr, and Sophonisba Breckinridge at the settlement. Stevens became one of the few women involved at Hull House who had first-hand experience of working-class life. She represented the labor organizations of northwestern Ohio in the National Industrial Conference in St. Louis, Missouri, in February 1892, and in the Omaha, Nebraska convention of the People's Party, July 1892.

For several years, Stevens held a position on the editorial staff of the Toledo Bee. By 1893, she was half owner and editor of the Vanguard, an organ of the People's Party, published in Chicago in the interests of economic and industrial reforms through political action. She was appointed to the Women's Auxiliary Committee of the 1893 World's Columbian Exposition Labor Congress. In that year, she became Florence Kelley's assistant as the state's factory inspector, and together the two women helped John Peter Altgeld to pass and enforce legislation that controlled child labor in Illinois. This included a law limiting women and children to a maximum eight-hour day. This success was short-lived and in 1895, the Illinois Manufacturers' Association had the law repealed. In 1896, Stevens became the first probation officer of the then-recently established Cook County Juvenile Court committee.

Stevens wrote on child labor in Child Slavery in America a chapter entitled "The child, the factory, and the state" (The Arena, vol. 10, June 1894), while an assistant factory inspector for Illinois. It was written from the standpoint that systematic wage labor on the part of children is an unmitigated evil as it is in childhood that all the habits are formed which are to determine what a man or woman will be disposed to do, or will be able to do when grown. A child reared into an adult without participating in productive work is more often spoiled than benefited by the exemption. The discussion was more of a judicious and instructive study than hyper-fervid diatribes. The real question she probed was how early in life productive labor becomes essential to the best growth of body, mind, and ability.
