= Lizzie Holmes =

American anarchist journalist (1850–1926)

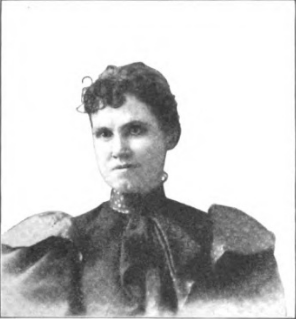
- Born: Elizabeth May Hunt; December 21, 1850; Iowa, U.S.
- Died: August 8, 1926 (aged 75); Santa Fe, New Mexico, U.S.
- Other name: "Lizzie"
- Occupations: writer; editor; union organizer
- Spouses: Hiram J. Swank (m. 1867; died 1872); William Holmes (m. 1885)
- Children: 2
- Writing career
- Pen name: "May Huntley"
- Language: English
- Subject: labor movement

Lizzie Holmes (née, Hunt; after first marriage, Swank; after second marriage, Holmes; pen name, May Huntley; December 21, 1850 – August 8, 1926) was an American anarchist, writer, and organizer of Chicago's working women during the late 19th century in the United States. She was a key figure in Chicago's labor movement in the years just preceding the Haymarket affair, during which she worked with and played a leading role in a range of unions including the Knights of Labor and the International Working People's Association. Prior to becoming a labor organizer, she worked as a school teacher and music instructor in Ohio.

In addition to her work as a labor organizer, Holmes served as a writer and editor in various radical and anarchist newspapers. She worked as the assistant editor of The Alarm, and she published articles in Lucifer, the Light-Bearer, Freedom, and Free Society. In contrast to some of her anarchist contemporaries, she was also willing to publish in more conservative outlets, which led to her publishing a string of articles in the American Federation of Labor affiliated journal American Federationist. Holmes published articles on a diverse array of topics, including free love, marriage, gender inequality, and economic injustice. Holmes also published multiple works of fiction, including a full-length novel entitled Hagar Lyndon; or, A Woman's Rebellion.

Along with her close friend and collaborator Lucy Parsons, Holmes fought for and demonstrated the validity of gender equality within the anarchist and broader labor movement. Holmes has been recognized as an early pioneer of anarchist feminism, and an influence on more prominent thinkers like Emma Goldman.

After the Haymarket affair, Holmes testified in court on behalf of her friend Albert Parsons. Following his execution and the subsequent crackdown on left-wing organizing in Chicago, many outlets Holmes had previously helped edit became defunct, including The Alarm. Holmes was under constant pressure from law enforcement following the Haymarket affair, serving a short time in jail with Lucy Parsons for agitation and anarchist organizing. Holmes and her husband left Chicago for the western United States, eventually settling in New Mexico, where she spent the last years of her life. Holmes continued to write for both radical and mainstream labor newspapers and magazines until 1908, when she retreated into a private life.

== Early life ==
Elizabeth (nickname, "Lizzie") May Hunt was born in Iowa on December 21, 1850. She was the daughter of Jonathan Hunt (1822–1900) and the radical feminist Hannah Jackson Hunt (1825–1903), an occasional contributor to the free love journal Lucifer, the Light-Bearer. When Lizzie Hunt was four years old, her family moved to a "free love" commune in Berlin Heights, Ohio, which is where she spent her remaining childhood years. Holmes received a relatively early and advanced education, which allowed her to start teaching in a one-room schoolhouse in Ohio by the time she was fifteen. At the age of 17, Holmes married her first husband, Hiram J. Swank. Holmes continued teaching despite her marriage, insisting at an early age on some form of economic independence. Lizzie gave birth to two children by Swank, a son in 1868, and a daughter in 1873. The Swank family remained in Ohio for 12 years before Lizzie left for Chicago in 1879, inspired to get involved in the labor movement after reading about the Great Railroad Strike of 1877.

According to Holmes, Hiram Swank died after five years of marriage, and Holmes left for Chicago accompanied only by her mother, her two brothers, and her children. The census records at the time do not confirm Swank's death, and it is possible that Holmes left Swank in Ohio and constructed a new public persona as a widow in Chicago. In either case, Swank does not play a role in the remainder of Lizzie's life.

== Organizing in Chicago ==
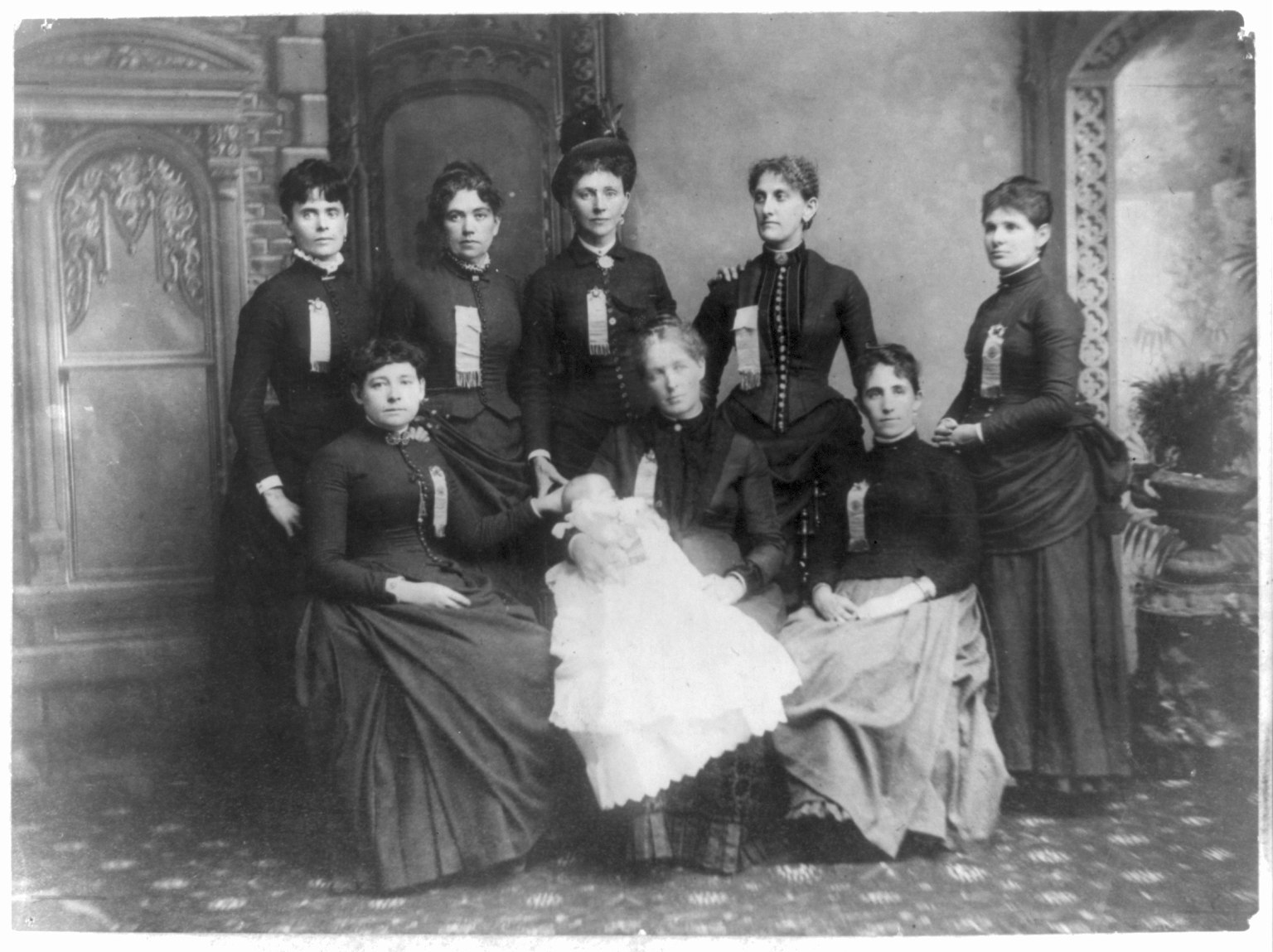
Women delegates to the 1886 Convention of the Knights of Labor

Upon her arrival in Chicago, Holmes began working as a seamstress in a cloak factory. She expressed some frustration at her inability to find work as a music teacher, but she ultimately viewed her seamstress job as formative for her politics, explaining in a later interview with the Chicago Times that she had a "desire to know the [working class] intimately" and that she learned "all the struggles, the efforts of genteel poverty, the pitiful pride with which working girls hide their destitution and drudgery from the world." After little more than a year in Chicago, Lizzie joined the Working Women's Union, which at the time was an arm of the Socialist Labor Party of America. The Working Women's Union at the time was launching a campaign for an eight-hour work day, and Holmes became heavily involved in the effort. She was subsequently fired from her work as a seamstress due to her efforts to unionize her workplace, but Holmes remained undeterred in her affiliation with the union. She gave multiple public addresses at union meetings, and the popularity of her speeches eventually landed her a job as the union secretary. During her time as secretary, the Working Women's Union became an affiliate of the Knights of Labor, which at the time was among the most popular labor unions in the United States. Holmes played a prominent role in organizing garment industry workers in Chicago throughout her time as secretary, and by 1886, Holmes and her affiliated women activists had organized three different Knights of Labor assemblies representing garment industry workers. As secretary with the WWU, Holmes also met other prominent activists, including Lucy Parsons and Lizzie's eventual husband, the British anarchist William Holmes. Parsons introduced Lizzie Holmes to both socialism and anarchism, with Holmes quickly understanding the socialist critique of capitalism based on her time in the garment industry. Parsons also introduced Holmes to more radical organizations, and Holmes joined the anarchists in the International Working People's Association in 1885.

Holmes's affiliation with the radical labor movement in Chicago also gave her multiple opportunities to write articles, which she took up in addition to her organizing work. Holmes became a prolific writer of both non-fiction articles and works of fiction throughout the 1880s, publishing stories and educational material in a variety of radical newspapers and magazines. Holmes wrote multiple articles decrying the horrific labor conditions she experienced in the garment factories, and her stories were picked up by newspapers like the Anti-Monopolist, Labor Enquirer, and Nonconformist.

Holmes eventually served as the assistant editor of The Alarm, the newspaper of the International Working People's Association. Her editing work took some time away from labor organizing, but Holmes still found time to march with the seamstresses. On April 28, 1885, Lizzie Holmes and Lucy Parsons led a march on the newly build Chicago Board of Trade building, solidifying their reputation as leaders in the Chicago anarchist and labor movement. Their prominence constantly drew the ire of the authorities, who painted both Parsons and Holmes as dangerous terrorists.

In November 1885, Lizzie married fellow anarchist William Holmes. Upon their marriage, they both moved out of Chicago and into Geneva, Illinois. Lizzie Holmes re-established herself as a school teacher in Geneva, but neither she nor William gave up on anarchist organizing. Both of them regularly returned to Chicago to organize with Albert and Lucy Parsons, including in the days directly preceding the Haymarket affair.

== Haymarket and its aftermath ==
Lizzie Holmes returned to Chicago the day before the Haymarket affair. On May 3, 1886, Lizzie led a march of several hundred sewing women, demanding an eight-hour workday. The march was covered by the Chicago Tribune, who described the marching women as having "worn faces and threadbare clothing, bearing evidence of a struggle for an uncomfortable existence." After the march, Lizzie briefly returned to Geneva, but she received a telegraph from Lucy Parsons instructing her to return to Chicago for the rally scheduled for May 4. The following morning, Holmes returned to Chicago and attended the anarchist rally that evening. The rally was suppressed by the Chicago police, and in the midst of the ensuing chaos, a bomb was thrown into the crowd. The bomb killed eleven people and injured dozens, in an event that quickly became infamous across the United States. Holmes and Lucy Parsons were uninjured by the bomb, but they quickly suspected that Albert Parsons would be among those blamed for the bombing. On the morning of May 5, Lucy and Lizzie went to the offices of the Alarm to find the Chicago police ransacking the building. Alarm was formally censured by the Chicago Police Department, and Holmes and Parsons were arrested in connection with inciting the bombing. They were quickly released due to lack of evidence, but Lucy grew more suspicious that they were going to charge her husband with a serious crime.

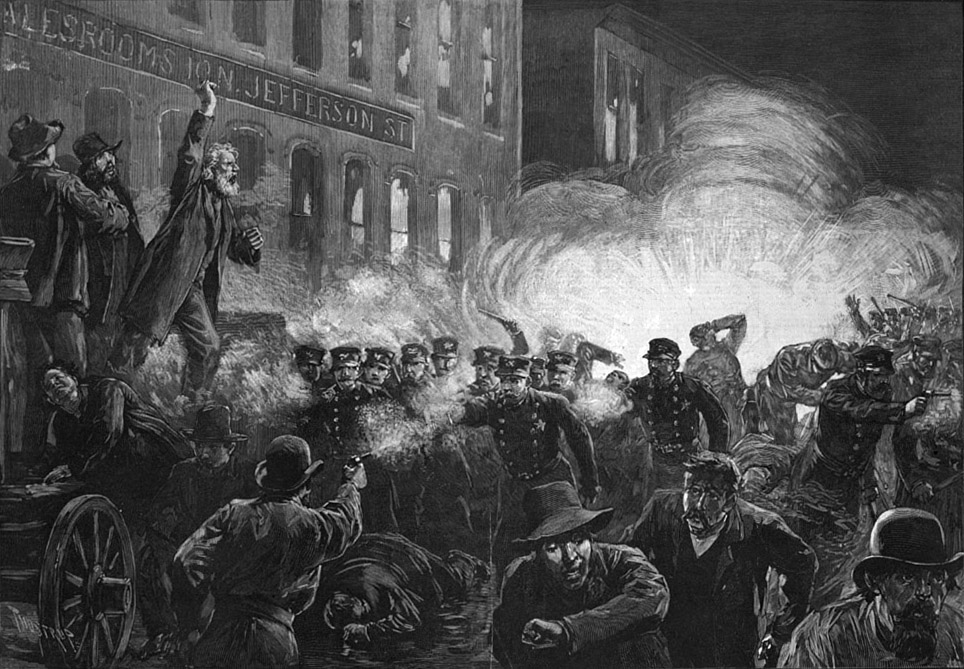
An illustration of the Haymarket Riot in Harper's Magazine

Albert Parsons had escaped the morning after the bombing, spending a short time with William Holmes in Geneva, later traveling to Wisconsin to evade the Chicago authorities. After his friends were arrested, however, Albert Parsons returned to Chicago and turned himself in to the authorities. During the trial of the Haymarket anarchists, Lizzie Holmes testified on behalf of Albert Parsons, claiming that he couldn't have possibly thrown the bomb due to him being with her in a café at the time the bomb was thrown. Holmes also claimed that anarchism was inherently non-violent, testifying that the "theory of anarchy is opposed to all idea of force." In spite of her testimony, Parsons was sentenced to death by hanging.

Many of the anarchist organizations and institutions previously built up by Lizzie Holmes came under both legal and public scrutiny following the Haymarket Affair, as public opinion turned against anarchism. The Alarm came back, with Lizzie as editor, but under the shadow of Haymarket, it never achieved the same level of attention or interest. Lizzie Holmes was investigated by the authorities on multiple occasions, and under the threat of legal duress, she moved away from the level of radical organizing that had occupied so much of her life in previous years. Holmes and her husband moved to Colorado in 1889, eventually settling in New Mexico in the mid-1890s.

Despite these circumstances, Holmes still found time to write for various newspapers and magazines. During the early years of the 1890s, Holmes wrote a novel entitled Hagar Lyndon; or, A Woman's Rebellion, which she published serially in Lucifer, the Light-Bearer in 1893. Holmes would also write for other radical newspapers, including the newly formed Free Society, which she contributed to with her husband. Holmes would eventually write a series of short stories for the American Federation of Labor, in a move criticized by some other anarchists as too accommodating, as the American Federation of Labor was far more conservative than many anarchist labor unions. Holmes did not shy away from radical politics in the stories she wrote for the American Federationist, however, and in subsequent years, the stories have been praised by labor scholars as interesting encapsulations of the labor movement that Holmes inhabited.

== Later years and death ==
Holmes continued to write for various radical newspapers until 1908, after which she quietly left public life. Holmes and her husband lived in Albuquerque, New Mexico during the bulk of her late years, until they moved to Santa Fe in 1926. That same year, on August 8, Lizzie Holmes died in her home at the age of 75. Two years later, in 1928, her husband William Holmes followed her at the age of 78.

== Legacy ==
Holmes was instrumental in building the labor movement in Chicago, and many of the ideas that she advocated for only came to fruition following her death. Holmes was a constant figure in the fight for the eight-hour workday, a demand that would become federal law in the United States in 1938 under Franklin Roosevelt's New Deal.

Within the anarchist movement itself, Lizzie Holmes never reached the level of recognition achieved by names like Emma Goldman and Voltarine de Cleyre, but she has been recognized as an early influence on much of their work. Her willingness to talk about gender inequality in stark terms, as well as her fierce devotion to women's liberation, has led to some scholars like Jessica Moran calling her an early anarchist feminist. Contemporary labor scholars have also begun to re-examine her fiction as a source for late 19th century labor history, with scholars like Ruth Percy and Blaine McKinley mining her short stories for nuggets of truth regarding the labor movement and its relationship to the conditions of the working class in the United States.

== Selected works ==
- "Woman's future position in the world", 1899
- "Ladies' Self-Improvement Club at Leighton", 1904
- "In the Land of the Free", 1904
- "Slumming – A Story", 1904
- "Our Tyrants", 1904
- "The True Incentive", 1904
- "A Choice of Despotisms", 1904
- "The Labor of the Children", 1904
- "Women Workers of Chicago, How the pioneer work was done by a band of self-sacrificing women who paved the way for the powerful unions of the present day", 1905
