= Rob Kirkpatrick =

American writer

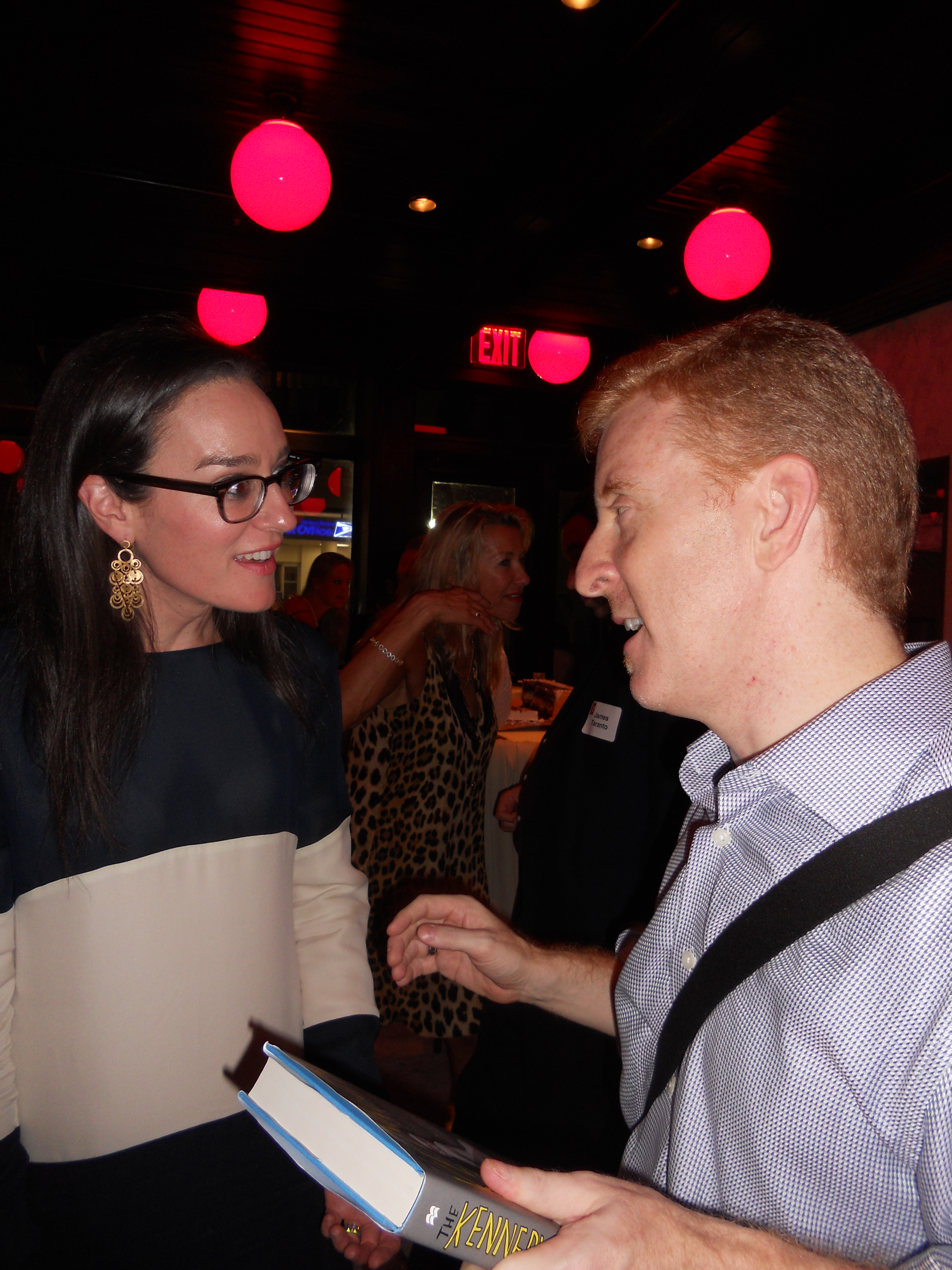

Rob Kirkpatrick is an American literary agent, editor, and author. He has published the books of many well-known authors, primarily in the field of nonfiction. He is the author of the narrative history 1969: The Year Everything Changed.

== Early life ==
Rob Kirkpatrick was born and raised in upstate New York. His father was the Town Supervisor for Newburgh (town), New York and coined the town's official motto "Crossroads of the Northeast." Kirkpatrick attended Wallkill Senior High School, graduated from Rutgers University, and received his Doctor of Philosophy from Binghamton University.

== Career ==
Kirkpatrick has worked as a commissioning editor in the book publishing industry. While acquiring titles for Thomas Dunne Books, Kirkpatrick edited The Peasant Prince, Alex Storozynski's biography of Tadeusz Kościuszko, published in 2009. He also edited Nathaniel Frank's Unfriendly Fire. Janet R. Maslin of The New York Times praised the book as, "A sharp, vigorously framed analysis argued so discerningly, so substantively and so well."

In 2012, Kirkpatrick edited and published The Wrecking Crew: The Inside Story of Rock and Roll's Best-Kept Secret by Kent Hartman, which won both the Oregon Book Award for General Nonfiction and the Audie Award for History. Maslin praised the book, writing "It makes good music sound better."

In 2013, he published Bill Rodgers' memoir Marathon Man: My 26.2-Mile Journey from Unknown Grad Student to the Top of the Running World. 2014 Boston Marathon winner Meb Keflezighi credited Bill Rodgers' book with helping him plan his strategy for the race.

In 2014, Kirkpatrick published Charles Falco's memoir Vagos, Mongols, and Outlaws, which would serve as the basis for the TV series Gangland Undercover. Kirkpatrick also published the memoir from musician Viv Albertine, Clothes, Clothes, Clothes. Music, Music, Music. Boys, Boys, Boys. Rolling Stone ranked it as one of the 10 Best Music Books of 2014, and Rough Trade named it the #1 Book of the Year. In 2019, the New York Times named Albertine's book one of "The 50 Best Memoirs of the Past 50 Years."

In 2015, it was announced Kirkpatrick had moved to an imprint of HarperCollins. He was the editor for 50 Years, 50 Moments, co-written by Jerry Rice and Randy O. Marshall.

In 2015, Kirkpatrick joined The Stuart Agency as a literary agent. In his first few deals as an agent, he has represented authors Bob Tewksbury, Chael Sonnen, Steven Novella from The Skeptics' Guide to the Universe, and Olivia Hussey.

In 2018, Kirkpatrick formed his own agency, Kirkpatrick Literary. In April 2019, Kirkpatrick brokered his first deal with his new agency in selling the rights to David Wright's forthcoming memoir, to be co-authored by Anthony DiComo, to Dutton, an imprint of Penguin Random House. The industry web site Publishers Marketplace named the sale its "Deal of the Day."

=== Writing ===
Kirkpatrick is the author of Cecil Travis of the Washington Senators: The War-Torn Career of an All-Star Shortstop (2005), Magic in the Night: The Words and Music of Bruce Springsteen (2006), and 1969: The Year Everything Changed (2009).

1969 was published in 2009 for the 40th anniversary of that year and was featured in a two-page story by Craig Wilson (columnist) in USA Today. The book received positive reviews from the History (U.S. TV channel) Magazine, which called it "A compelling account of the historic year" and Library Journal, which said, "In this compelling account, Kirkpatrick treats the tumultuous events of 1969 with the skills of a journalist, a historian, a sociologist, and a sportswriter and manages to insert moments of lightness and triviality into his grand tour."

2009 also saw the publication of trade paperback versions for his books on Travis and Springsteen. Following its paperback publication, Magic in the Night was praised by PopMatters as "A treasure trove for serious Springsteen fans," and The Irish Times said "It is always salutary to be reminded that no matter how much you think you know something, there is always someone who knows more. And when it comes to Bruce Springsteen...Rob Kirkpatrick knows more, a lot more."

Kirkpatrick has written about film, music, sports, and cultural issues for such online sites as The Huffington Post and PopMatters. In his most responded-to piece, he addressed comments on race and sports by ESPN commentators Rob Parker (sports journalist) and also Jalen Rose, whose comments Kirkpatrick placed within a larger social narrative of Uncle Tom-ism and the acting white slur.

Other works include "Epiphany at Coogan's Bluff" in the Slow Trains Literary Journal (2007), The Quotable Sixties (as editor), Lyons, (2006), and "Thirteen Ways of Looking at a Knuckleball" in Aethlon: The Journal of Sport Literature (East Tennessee State University Press, 2005).

== Personal life ==
In June 2013, Kirkpatrick married author and editor Toni Margarita Plummer at a ceremony in Garrison, New York.

== Filmography ==
- Gangland Undercover, History (U.S. TV channel) miniseries (2015), executive producer.
- Sex in '69: The Sexual Revolution in America, History (U.S. TV channel) documentary (2009), appears as himself.
