= 1969: The Year Everything Changed =

2009 book by Rob Kirkpatrick

- Author: Rob Kirkpatrick
- Language: English
- Subject: Narrative history
- Publisher: Skyhorse Publishing
- Publication date: 2009; reprinted in 2019

1969: The Year Everything Changed is a narrative history book written by American author Rob Kirkpatrick, originally published in 2009.

== Synopsis ==
Divided into four parts that correspond with the four seasons of the year, the book chronicles the history of 1969 in American society and culture. The author delves into such events as the New York Jets' historic Super Bowl victory, Richard Nixon's inauguration, the birth of punk music and the first Led Zeppelin tour, the publication of The Godfather and release of Easy Rider, the Santa Barbara oil spill and the Cuyahoga River fire, the Battle of Hamburger Hill, the People's Park and Stonewall riots, the Apollo 11 Moon landing, the Chappaquiddick incident, the Woodstock Festival, the Manson Family and Zodiac Killer murders, the Miracle Mets' championship season, the peace movement and the birth of the Weathermen, the Days of Rage, the Occupation of Alcatraz, the murder of Fred Hampton, and the Altamont Free Concert.

== Critical and public reception ==
1969 received positive reviews upon its publication. In a two-page article in USA Today on January 26, Craig Wilson commented, "The subtitle of his new book, 1969: The Year Everything Changed, may sound hyperbolic, but Kirkpatrick makes a good case that it was a year of 'landmark achievements, cataclysmic episodes and generation-defining events.'" Booklist called it "A riveting look at a pivotal year," and in an e-newsletter to subscribers, The History Channel Magazine described it as "a compelling account of the historic year." Library Journal praised the writing, saying, "Kirkpatrick treats the tumultuous events of 1969 with the skills of a journalist, a historian, a sociologist, and a sportswriter and manages to insert moments of lightness and triviality into his grand tour. He writes as easily about jazz-pop as about the rise of the American Indian Movement," and added, "Nostalgic for some, revelatory for others, this is a worthy addition to the literature of the 1960s."

According to the industry web site Publishers Marketplace, the book made the Amazon eBook General bestseller list in November 2009. It was reissued as a "50th Anniversary Edition" with a new introductory chapter in 2019.

== Popular citations ==
In the Acknowledgments to her 2019 #1 New York Times-bestselling novel Summer of '69, author Elin Hilderbrand credits Kirkpatrick's book with playing an important role in her research as she tried to "portray the spirit" of Nantucket and Martha's Vineyard in 1969: "I read many, many books, the most helpful of which were Nantucket Only Yesterday: An Island View of the Twentieth Century, by Nantucket legend Robert Mooney, and Rob Kirkpatrick's 1969: The Year Everything Changed." 1969 also is included in the Bibliography for the New York Times bestseller The Vietnam War: An Intimate History, the companion book by Geoffrey C. Ward and Ken Burns for The Vietnam War (TV series).
