= 1969 (disambiguation) =

1969 was a common year starting on Wednesday of the Gregorian calendar.

1969 may also refer to:

- 1969, the number
- "1969", a song from The Stooges' 1969 album, The Stooges
- 1969 (Gábor Szabó album), 1969
- 1969 (Julie Driscoll album), 1971
- 1969: The Velvet Underground Live, a 1974 live album by The Velvet Underground
- 1969 (film), a 1988 drama film
- "1969", a song from Keith Stegall's 1996 album, Passages
- "1969" (Stargate SG-1), a second-season episode of the TV series Stargate SG-1
- "1969", a song from Boards of Canada's 2002 album, Geogaddi
- 1969: The Year Everything Changed, a 2009 narrative history book by Rob Kirkpatrick
- 1969 (Myka 9 album), 2009
- 1969 (Pink Martini and Saori Yuki album), 2011
- 1969 (EP), an EP by Steel Train
- 1969 (TV series), a docuseries on ABC
