= Gangland Undercover =

Canadian-American drama television series

- Genre: Drama
- Created by: Stephen Kemp
- Based on: Vagos, Mongols, and Outlaws: My Infiltration of America's Deadliest Biker Gangs by Charles Falco with Kerrie Droban
- Written by: Noel Baker; Stephen Kemp
- Directed by: Stephen Kemp (series dir.)
- Starring: Damon Runyan; Ari Cohen; Paulino Nunes; James Cade; Melanie Scrofano; Don Francks; Ian Matthews
- Opening theme: Russ Mackay "We Will Not Go Quietly" by Sixx: A.M. (Season 2)
- Composers: Russ Mackay; Allan Pynn; Paul Pitre
- Countries of origin: Canada; United States
- Original language: English
- No. of seasons: 2
- No. of episodes: 14

Production
- Executive producers: Stephen Kemp; Sherri Rufh; Santo Cornacchia Tanga; Spencer Medof; Elaine Frontain Bryant; Julian Hobbs; Stephen Mintz; Charles Tremayne; Brendan Deneen and Rob Kirkpatrick for Macmillan Entertainment
- Producer: Santo Cornacchia Tanga
- Production location: Ontario, Canada
- Cinematography: Gary Clarke
- Editors: Rob Chandler; Jason Gatt; Mark Holtze; Tom Fulford; Nathan Mandin; Susan Maggi; Buff Smith
- Running time: 45 minutes
- Production companies: Shaw Media; McMillan Entertainment; A&E Television Networks (Season 2); Cineflix (Biker 2) Inc. (S2); Corus Entertainment (S2); Canal D (Season 2)

Original release
- Network: History (CA); History (U.S.)
- Release: February 24, 2015 – May 20, 2017

Gangland Undercover is a Canadian-American fact-based drama television series written and created by executive producer Stephen Kemp and co-writer Noel Baker. It was inspired by the story of Charles Falco a former ATF confidential informant (CI) who infiltrated an outlaw motorcycle club. The series is based on the memoir Vagos, Mongols, and Outlaws: My Infiltration of America's Deadliest Biker Gangs written by Charles Falco with Kerrie Droban. It premiered on Tuesday, February 24, 2015, on the History Channel at 10/9c. In Canada, Season 2 premiered on September 26, 2016. In the U.S., only the first episode of season 2 aired on December 8, 2016, on A&E. According to the trailer, "the new season" (Season 2) premiered on March 2, 2017. History US has cancelled Gangland Undercover just eight episodes into Season 2.

== Premise ==
A description at the beginning of the first episode stated: "This program is based on Charles Falco's account of events that took place between 2003 and 2006, when he infiltrated one of America's most notorious biker gangs. Names, locations and key details have been changed to protect the identities of those involved."

Opening Introduction (narrated by Charles Falco – voice disguised):

When I first took a deal to become an undercover informant of a biker gang, I did it to save my own skin. But over the next three years, putting bad guys away became my personal mission. I saw it as a chance to make amends for my past mistakes. But I paid a heavy price. I'm Charles Falco, and this is my story.

== Cast ==
=== Main cast ===
- Damon Runyan as Charles Falco, meth dealer-turned-ATF confidential informant, undercover in the Vagos Motorcycle Club; he's nicknamed Quick, from a "hang-around", a prospect to a full-patched member. In Season 2, he is in the witness protection program and goes undercover as a prospect named Chef in the Mongols Motorcycle Club, and later a member of the Outlaws Motorcycle Club.
- Ari Cohen as Mike Kozinski (aka Koz), ATF special agent and Falco's handler. In Season 2, as Ziggy, an undercover Mongols Sargeant-at-Arms, Pomona Chapter
- Paulino Nunes as Schizo, Vagos Chapter President
- James Cade as Stash, Vagos prospect-turned-full-patched member
- Ian Matthews as Darko, Vagos Sergeant-at-Arms. In Season 2, he is an ATF CI as a member of the probationary chapter of the Outlaws.
- Stephen Eric McIntyre as Kid, Vagos Vice President and Falco's prospect sponsor. In Season 2 as The Devil, the unhinged Outlaws President
- Don Francks as Lizard, Vagos Road Captain
- Melanie Scrofano as Suzanna, Stella's friend and Falco's girlfriend

Season 2

- Thomas Mitchell as Bullet, ATF special agent working undercover as a member of the Mongols, their Sergeant-at-Arms. He starts up a new probationary chapter for the Outlaws.
- Hannah Anderson as Sarah Jane, a waitress at the Tulip Diner Charlie befriends
- Shaun Benson as Crowbar, Pagans President
- Joanne Boland as Meredith Jones/Wilson, ATF field operations management and Bullet's handler

=== Supporting/recurring cast ===
Season 1

- Kiran Friesen as Stella, Schizo's "old lady" (wife)
- Ashley Tredenick as Red, Kid's old lady
- Patricia McKenzie as Samantha Kiles, detective in the San Bernardino Organized Crime Unit
- Jessica Huras as Natalie Falco, ex-wife of Charles Falco
- Markus Parillo as Felix, Vagos International President
- John Tench as Green, Vagos member of Australian chapter, ATF informant
- Romano Orzari as Bernard, Falco's former meth business partner

Season 2

- Chris Ratz as Dirtbag, Pagans Sergeant-at-Arms
- Sora Olah as Sherri, Charlie's witness protection handler
- Pedro Miguel Arce as Paco, a local gunrunner
- Christian Bako as Sputnik, Outlaws member who's Russian
- Dan Masters as Foghorn, Outlaws member who's a mute
- Brendan Eckstrom as Razor, Merciless Souls (Maggots) Sergeant-at-Arms
- Justin Mader as Sniper
- Ryan Blakely as Bug (Chester Peters), a former felon-turned-ATF CI who joins Bullet's Outlaws probationary chapter.
- Andrew Jackson as Tug, Mongols National Sergeant-at-Arms
- Michael Copeland as Miles, Mongols International President
- Ivan Wanis Ruiz as Hector, Surenos gang leader

=== Guest cast ===
- Ron Kennell as Reese, liquid methamphetamine drug dealer (Season 1)
- Daniel Williston as Hammer, former Vagos member and Schizo's buddy, believed to be a snitch (Season 1)
- Michael Reventar as Thor, Falco's cellmate at FCI Lompoc (Season 1)
- Alejandro Ampudia as El Toro Malo, head prison guard at FCI Lompoc (Season 1)
- Brayden Jones as Lucky, past Mongols prospect turned member in 1977 (Season 2)

=== Motorcycle clubs hierarchies ===
Vagos Motorcycle Club
| Character | Rank | Actor |
|---|---|---|
| Felix | International President | Markus Parillo |
| "Schizo" | Chapter President | Paulino Nunes |
| "Kid" | Chapter Vice President | Stephen Eric McIntyre |
| "Darko" | Chapter Sergeant-at-Arms | Ian Matthews |
| "Lizard" | Chapter Road Captain | Don Francks |
| "Stash" | Member | James Cade |

Mongols Motorcycle Club
| Character | Rank | Actor |
|---|---|---|
| Miles Torres | International President | Michael Copeland |
| "Tug" | National Sergeant-at-Arms | Andrew Jackson |
| "Ziggy" | Pomona Chapter Sergeant-at-Arms (undercover) | Ari Cohen |
| David "Bullet" | Chapter Sergeant-at-Arms | Thomas Mitchell |

Pagan's Motorcycle Club
| Character | Rank | Actor |
|---|---|---|
| "Crowbar" | Chapter President | Shaun Benson |
| "Dirtbag" | Chapter Sergeant-at-Arms | Chris Ratz |

== Series overview ==
| Season | Episodes | Originally released | |
| Season | Episodes | First released | Last released |
|---|---|---|---|
| 1 | 6 | February 24, 2015 | March 31, 2015 |
| 2 | 8 | September 26, 2016 (CA); March 2, 2017 (US) | November 14, 2016 (CA); May 20, 2017 (US) |

== Episodes ==
=== Season 1 (2015) ===
| No. in season | Title | Original release date | U.S. viewers (millions) |
|---|---|---|---|
| 1.1 | "Going Under" | February 24, 2015 | 1.06 |
In the series premiere, Charles Falco, a private contractor infiltrator for the ATF risks his life undercover when he infiltrates the notorious Vagos Motorcycle Club, a one percenter motorcycle club at their headquarters in Southern California. As a "hang-around", he gets to know the members during a bike run. However, he must quickly prove himself when a surprise invitation by the club's president puts him right in the middle of the underground counterculture of outlaw motorcycle club.
| 1.2 | "A Tough Prospect" | March 3, 2015 | N/A |
Six months in, Falco, now a prospect in the Vagos biker club, gets even closer to the members, but is subjected to constant hazing and waiting on their needs 24/7, including handling a drug deal with Dawg, a Nazi Lowrider. When a fight breaks out at the club's bar, a knockout punch earns Falco his "road name" by his sponsor, Kid, who calls him "Quick". A new motorcycle provided by Falco's handler, Koz, gives him added street cred with the club. However, after Lizard turns it into a real club bike, he now owes him a debt.
| 1.3 | "Patched In" | March 10, 2015 | N/A |
Now a full-patched member, Falco is getting used to the addictive outlaw biker lifestyle, and ends up in trouble during the club's annual bike run to Reno. Meanwhile, ATF raid Darko and Stash's place, causing the Vagos international president, Felix to question Schizo about having a snitch in his chapter. Later, Falco is promoted to joint sergeant of arms, but he pays a heavy price when he loses his only friend, Kid in a drug deal gone south, and his girlfriend, Susana's trust, as well as making an enemy in the end.
| 1.4 | "Dangerous Game" | March 17, 2015 | N/A |
Two years into his infiltration and four months after Kid's drug deal went south, Falco's collected enough evidence to put most of his brothers-in-arms away, however, he's still haunted by one crime. When Stash murders drug dealer Johnny H, the D.A.'s determination to convict him threatens to blow Falco's cover. Meanwhile, Falco proves he's a critical asset to both the Vagos and to his operation, now codenamed "22 Green", a joint operation between the ATF, DEA and local cops. But when he later throws the first punch in a bar brawl, Falco, Schizo, and Stash all find themselves behind bars on charges of attempted murder.
| 1.5 | "Solitary" | March 24, 2015 | N/A |
Behind bars, Falco is under real pressure imprisoned for a month inside FCI Lompoc. Amidst some of the most notorious gangs in the world, Falco has to do what is necessary to survive, learning the ropes from his cellmate Thor. During his time, he rises within the ranks as "The Rep" in the "Woods", a part of the Aryan Brotherhood all while under pressure from Suzanna's numerous questions. Just when it couldn't get any worse, Falco's former partner Bernard discovers his location and puts out a hit on him. It's only a matter of time before it's carried out. He lands himself in solitary, where time stops and he's left with his conscience. Darko is made president of his own chapter, defecting Schizo's members.
| 1.6 | "Endgame" | March 31, 2015 | N/A |
After three years of evidence gathering, Falco’s mission is nearly over. The ATF is finally ready to bring Operation 22 Green to an end, in a series of massive coordinated raids. Agent Koz wants Falco to lay low until the bust goes down, but when Schizo orders him (now the chapter VP) to orchestrate a major drug deal, keeping a low profile proves impossible. To make matters worse, Darko and Stash pressure him to defect and start cooking meth for their rival chapter, while Suzanna walks out on him for good. With the final police raid imminent, a vulnerable Falco is interrogated at gunpoint. Falco's whole life is torn apart and he has no idea if he’ll actually make it out alive.

=== Season 2 (2016-2017) ===
Note: * The first episode first aired in the U.S. on December 8, 2016, on A&E. It re-aired on March 2, 2017, returning to History Channel; after the third episode the show was pulled from the schedule.

| No. in season | Title | Canada air date | US air date | U.S. viewers (millions) |
|---|---|---|---|---|
| 2.1 | "Nowhere Man" | September 26, 2016 | March 2, 2017* | N/A |
In the season 2 premiere, former undercover ATF confidential informant Charles Falco is now living off the grid in the U.S. Marshals witness protection program in 2008 as 'Charlie Conners' a year after taking down the Vagos. He is a car mechanic in Virginia Beach trying to live a normal life frequenting a diner and talking to Sarah Jane, a waitress there, but he struggles with putting his past behind him. One day, he receives a call from his ex-handler Koz who offers him a job as a part-time CI to infiltrate the biker underworld of Petersburg, Virginia, which is home to the notorious Pagans and Outlaws Motorcycle Clubs.
| 2.2 | "The Devil You Know" | October 3, 2016 | March 9, 2017 | N/A |
Falco (aka Conners) goes back undercover in another biker gang. He is assigned to work with ATF special agent, Bullet who's the Mongols Sargeant-at-Arms, posing as his prospect, along with Bullet's handler, ATF agent Meredith Jones. They meet at a safe house in Tobacco Country and go over Operation Black Rain, an offshoot of a larger investigation into the Mongols in California. Falco gets a motorcycle and a nickname; 'Chef' after facing 20-odd years for cooking meth. The two are soon summoned to meet The Devil, the Outlaws vicious president who recently dismembered the Souls president over turf rights. Falco finds himself in the middle of a biker war between the Outlaws and Pagans against the Merciless Souls (aka Maggots) over drugs and territory in Petersburg.
| 2.3 | "Mongol Nation" | October 10, 2016 | March 16, 2017 | N/A |
The history of the Mongols bloody patched-in initiation is revealed in 1977. Falco and Bullet head to California for the weekend, where Falco, a prospect, hopes to earn his patch as a full-member of the Mongols. They meet up with Koz currently undercover as a long-standing member as Sargent-at-Arms assuming the name 'Ziggy'. But earning the patch isn't as easy as it was in the Vagos since he has to get permission from the club's International President, Miles, who doesn't want Bullet running his own chapter in Virginia. Also he's harassed by fellow member Tug who takes to humiliating Falco in public and tries to out him as ATF informant 'Charles Falco'. However, Tug makes enemies with the Surenos gang leader Hector and is gunned down. At his funeral, Miles tells the club it was the Maggots, and sends Bullet and the now patched Falco back home to start their chapter.
| 2.4 | "Black Rain" | October 17, 2016 | May 20, 2017 | N/A |
Operation Black Rain comes to a premature conclusion when the ATF raids the Mongols Motorcycle Club, incarcerating club president Miles. After the judge issues a ban on anyone wearing a Mongol's patch, it puts Falco's role as an informant in jeopardy, including Bullet's cover. Crowbar threatens them into joining the Pagans, but Bullet offers The Devil a deal to open a probationary chapter in the Outlaws to expand into Pagan territory and he agrees. However, they must find two more members to make a full chapter; a club made up with CI's. Through Meredith's ATF contacts, they find Chester Peters (aka Bug), a felon looking to make a deal. And to Falco's surprise, Darko who was in prison after the Vagos raid. Later, Falco receives unexpected news from Sarah Jane that she's pregnant just as she was about to leave for art school.
| 2.5 | "Club Adios" | October 24, 2016 | May 20, 2017 | N/A |
Falco is requested to partner with his old nemesis Darko, which leaves him to contemplate quitting the mission; and the Devil and posse arrive to inspect the new clubhouse, and the night takes a hellacious turn.
| 2.6 | "Inlaws and Outlaws" | October 31, 2016 | May 20, 2017 | N/A |
A chance run-in with the Devil exposes Falco and girlfriend Sarah Jane, putting them in a dangerous situation.
| 2.7 | "End of the Road" | November 7, 2016 | May 20, 2017 | N/A |
Falco's chapter is ordered to off a rival biker, but Meredith gets wind of the plan and threatens to end the operation. Meanwhile, Bullet has other ideas, and a scheme unfolds to fool the Devil.
| 2.8 | "The Devil's Patch" | November 14, 2016 | May 20, 2017 | N/A |
A missing cell phone that contains candid video recordings threatens to derail Falco's operation and leaves him facing a pivotal moment of truth.

== Potential third season ==
In a 2025 interview on the Vano VHS YouTube channel, Charles Falco and Damon Runyan discussed ideas for a possible third season of Gangland Undercover. Falco said the story could take place about a decade after Season 2, with flashbacks to events not previously shown, and would expand beyond biker gangs to include other criminal organizations he had infiltrated.

Runyan described the envisioned Falco as older, darker, and more morally ambiguous, with a stronger family element. He compared the tone to a violent, R-rated, Tarantino-style climax, and confirmed that some characters, including Darko, would return. Others, such as “The Devil,” would not appear, as the actor had died since the show’s airing. No third season has been announced.

== See also ==
- List of outlaw motorcycle clubs
- List of Motorcycle Club terms
