= Monuments relating to the Haymarket affair =

There are several monuments to commemorate the Haymarket affair.

== Haymarket Square, Chicago ==
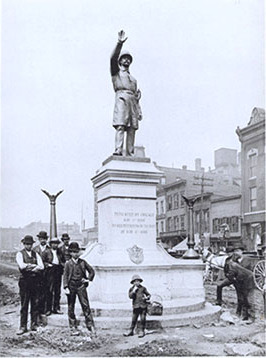
Workers finish installing Gelert's statue of a Chicago policeman in Haymarket Square, 1889. The statue was destroyed by a bomb in 1969 and a replica now stands at the Chicago Police Headquarters.

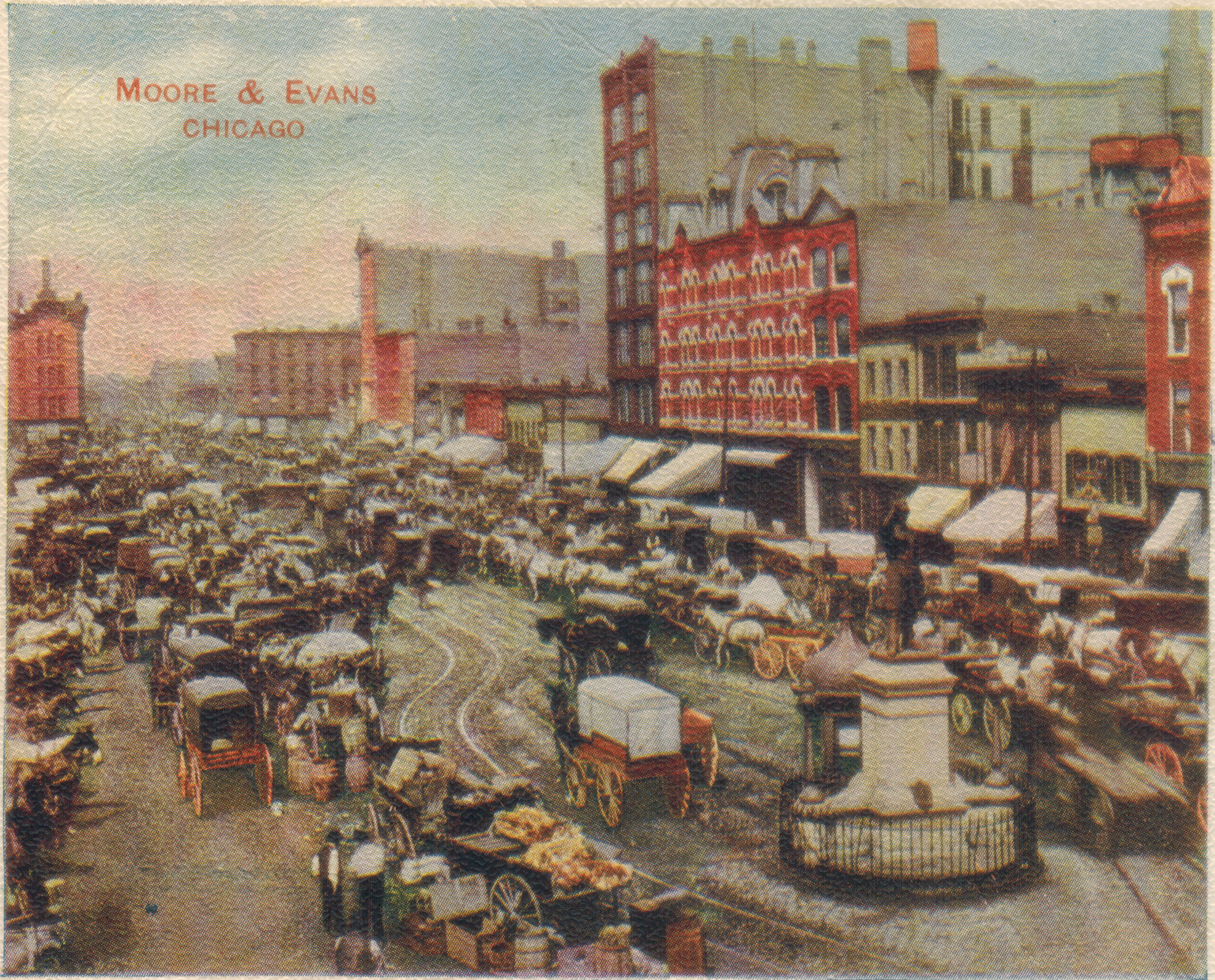
The original monument as seen in the busy Haymarket Square, circa 1905

In 1889, a commemorative nine-foot (2.7 meter) bronze statue of a Chicago policeman by sculptor Johannes Gelert was erected in the middle of Haymarket Square with small donations by citizens and by private funds raised by the Union League Club of Chicago. The statue was unveiled on May 30, 1889, by Frank Degan, the son of Officer Mathias Degan. On May 4, 1927, the 41st anniversary of the Haymarket affair, a streetcar jumped its tracks and crashed into the monument. The motorman said he was "sick of seeing that policeman with his arm raised". The city restored the statue in 1928 and moved it to Union Park. During the 1950s, construction of the Kennedy Expressway erased about half of the old, run-down market square area, and in 1956 the statue was moved to a special platform built for it overlooking the freeway, a few blocks from its original location.

The Haymarket statue was vandalized with black paint on May 4, 1968, the 82nd anniversary of the Haymarket affair, following a confrontation between police and demonstrators at a protest against the Vietnam War. On October 6, 1969, shortly before the "Days of Rage" protests, the statue was destroyed when a bomb was placed between its legs. Weatherman took credit for the blast, which broke nearly 100 windows in the neighborhood and scattered pieces of the statue onto the Kennedy Expressway below. The statue was rebuilt and unveiled on May 4, 1970, and was blown up yet again by Weatherman on October 6, 1970. The statue was rebuilt, again, and Mayor Richard J. Daley posted a 24‑hour police guard at the statue at a cost of US$67,440 per year. In 1972, it was moved to the lobby of the Central Police Headquarters, and in 1976 to the enclosed courtyard of the Chicago police academy. For another three decades the statue's empty, graffiti-marked pedestal stood on its platform sat in a run-down area overlooking the expressway, where it was known as an anarchist landmark. On June 1, 2007, the statue was rededicated at Chicago Police Headquarters with a new pedestal, unveiled by Geraldine Doceka, Officer Mathias Degan's great-granddaughter.

In 1992, the site of the speakers' wagon was marked by a bronze plaque set into the sidewalk, reading:

A decade of strife between labor and industry culminated here in a confrontation that resulted in the tragic death of both workers and policemen. On May 4, 1886, spectators at a labor rally had gathered around the mouth of Crane's Alley. A contingent of police approaching on Des Plaines Street were met by a bomb thrown from just south of the alley. The resultant trial of eight activists gained worldwide attention for the labor movement, and initiated the tradition of 'May Day' labor rallies in many cities.

Designated on March 25, 1992
Richard M. Daley, Mayor

=== Gallery ===
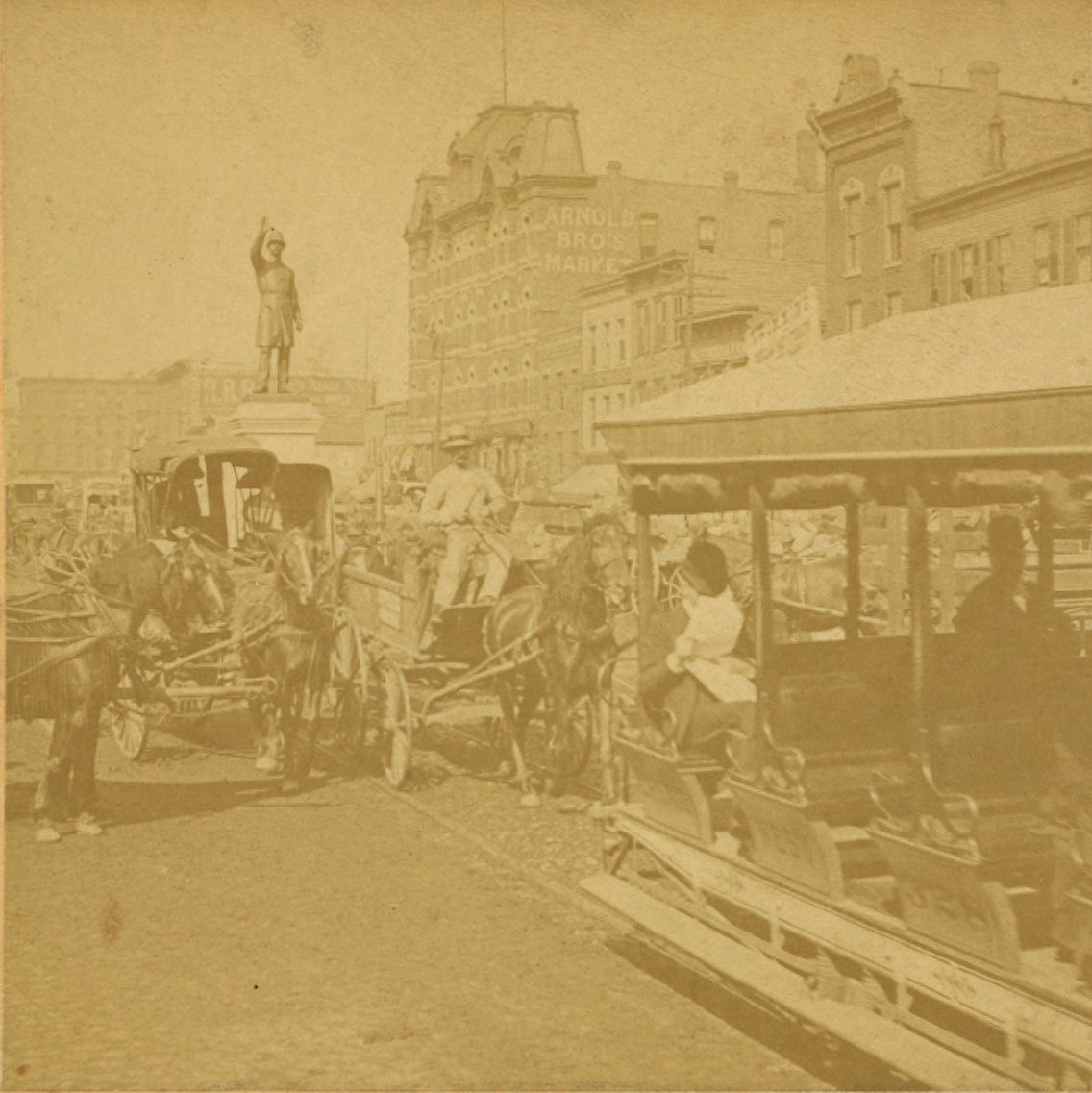
Place of the great riot, Chicago, Ill, by Kilburn, B. W. (Benjamin West), 1827–1909 (cropped)

illustration of the monument, circa 1897

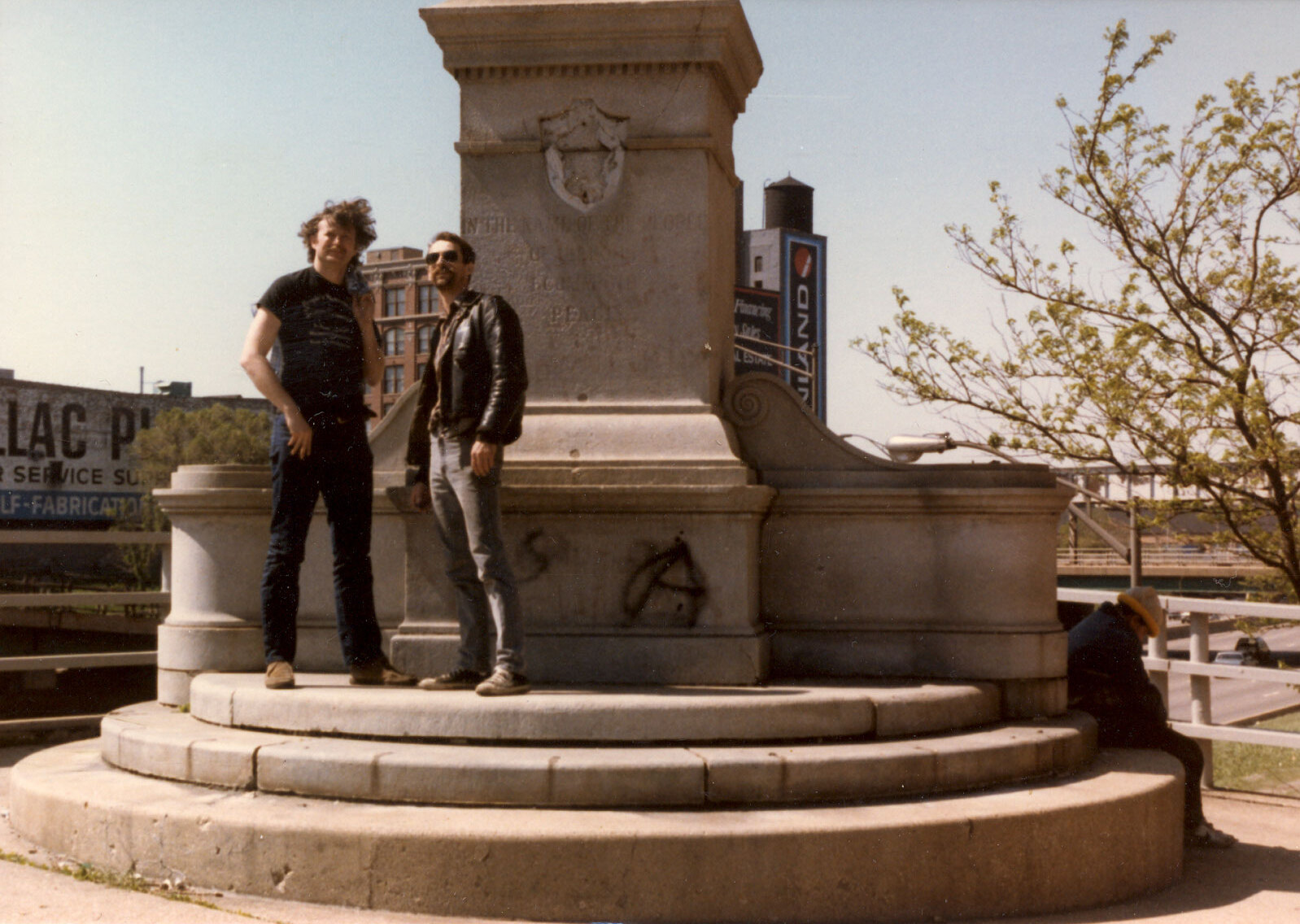
The statue-less pedestal of the police monument on the 100th anniversary of the Haymarket affair in May 1986; the pedestal has since been removed.

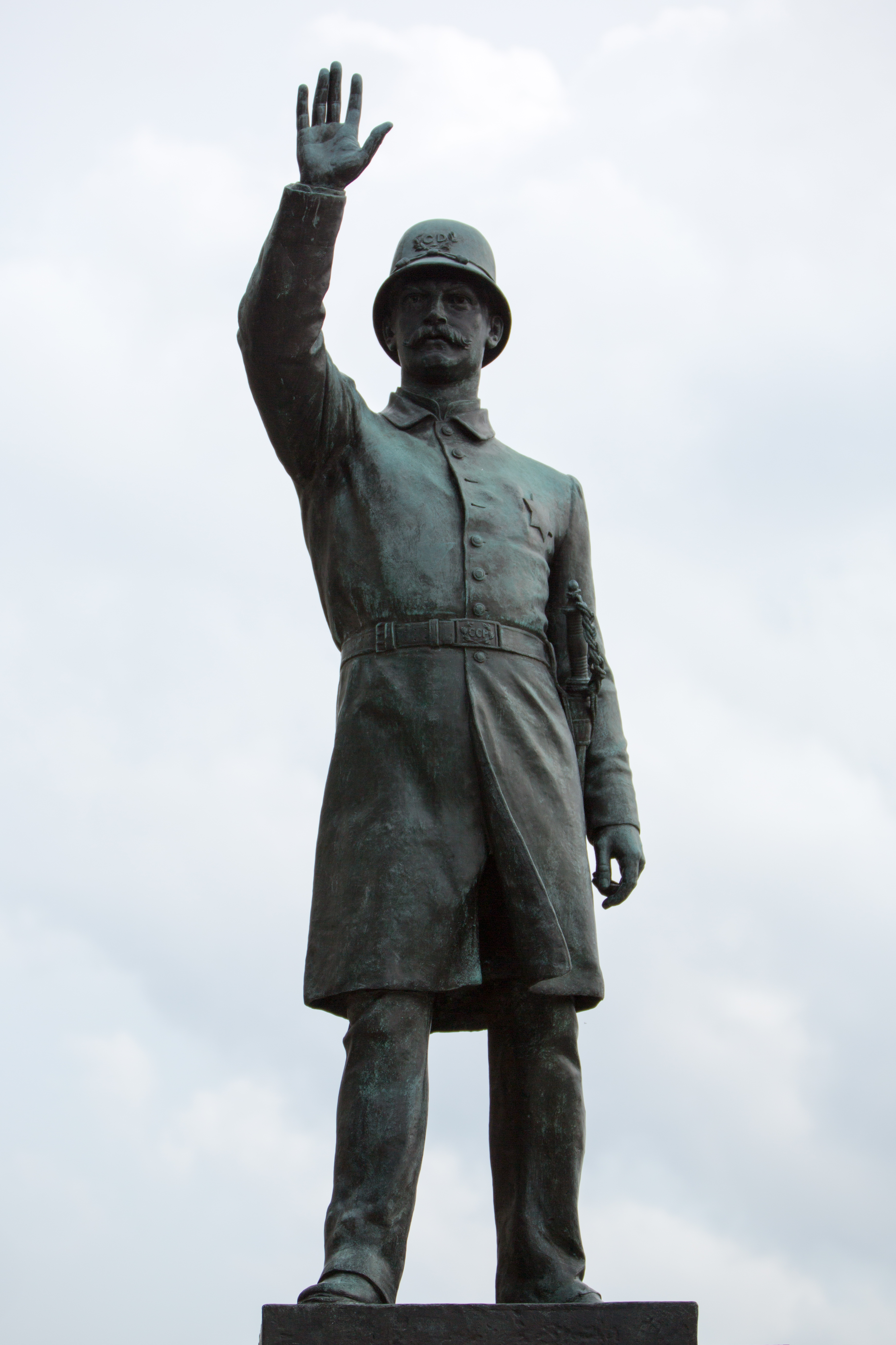
The statue at Chicago Police headquarters (photographed in 2015)

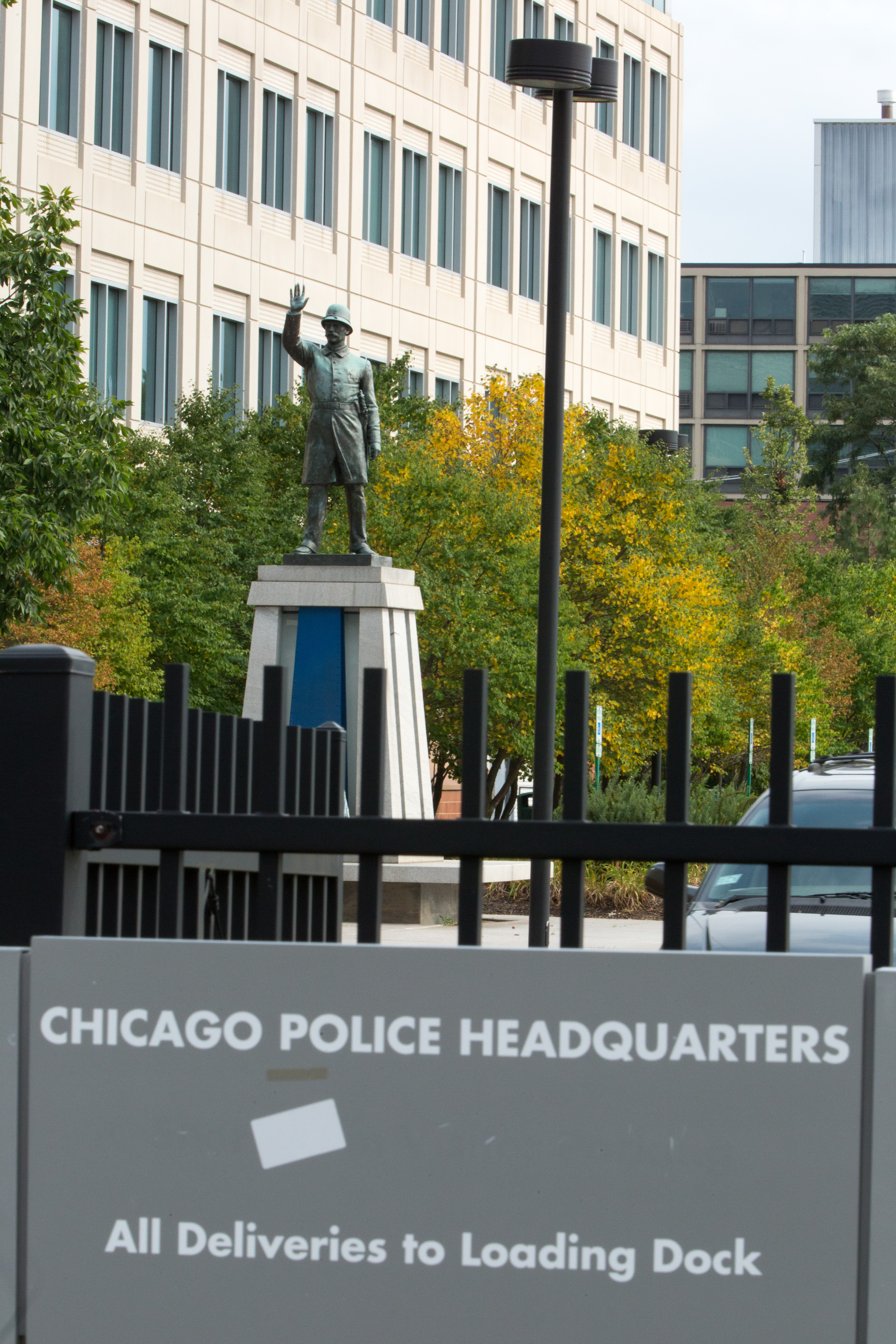
The statue at Chicago Police headquarters (photographed in 2015)

== Haymarket Martyrs' Monument ==
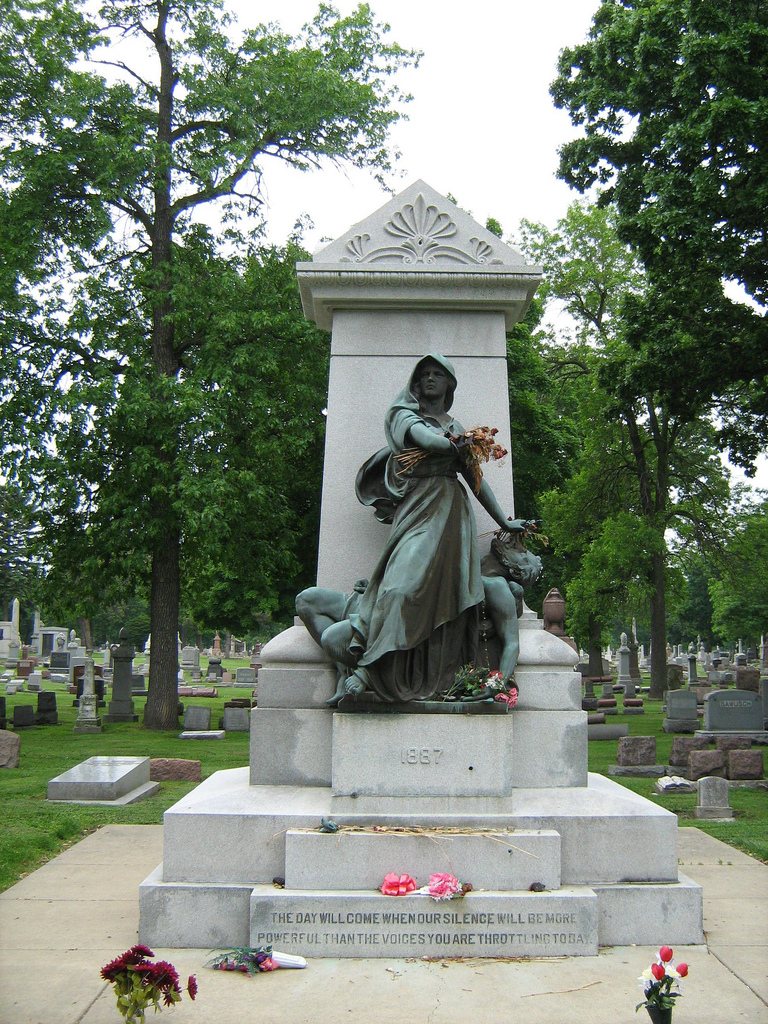
Haymarket Martyrs' Monument in Forest Home Cemetery

Following the Haymarket affair, trial and executions, the five dead defendants—George Engel, Adolph Fischer, Louis Lingg, Albert Parsons, and August Spies—were buried at the German Waldheim Cemetery (later merged with Forest Home Cemetery) in Forest Park, Illinois, a suburb of Chicago. When he died, defendant Oscar Neebe was buried at Waldheim, where there is also a memorial for the seventh defendant, Michael Schwab.

The Pioneer Aid and Support Association organized a subscription for a funeral monument. In 1893, the Haymarket Martyrs' Monument by sculptor Albert Weinert was raised at Waldheim. It consists of a 16-foot-high granite shaft capped by a carved triangular stone. There is a two step base, which also supports a monumental figure of a woman standing over the body of a fallen worker, both in bronze. It was dedicated on June 25, 1893, after a march from Chicago. The inscription on the steps read, "1887", the year of the executions. Also, there is a quote attributed to Spies, recorded just before his execution by hanging: "The day will come when our silence will be more powerful than the voice you are throttling today."

On the back of the monument are listed the names of the men. On the top of the monument, a bronze plaque contains text of the pardon later issued by Illinois governor John Peter Altgeld.

The dedication ceremony was attended by 8,000, with union flags and the American flag draped on the monument. European unions and American organizations sent flowers to be placed.

The Haymarket Martyrs' Monument was designated a National Historic Landmark by the United States Department of the Interior in 1997.

== The Haymarket Memorial ==
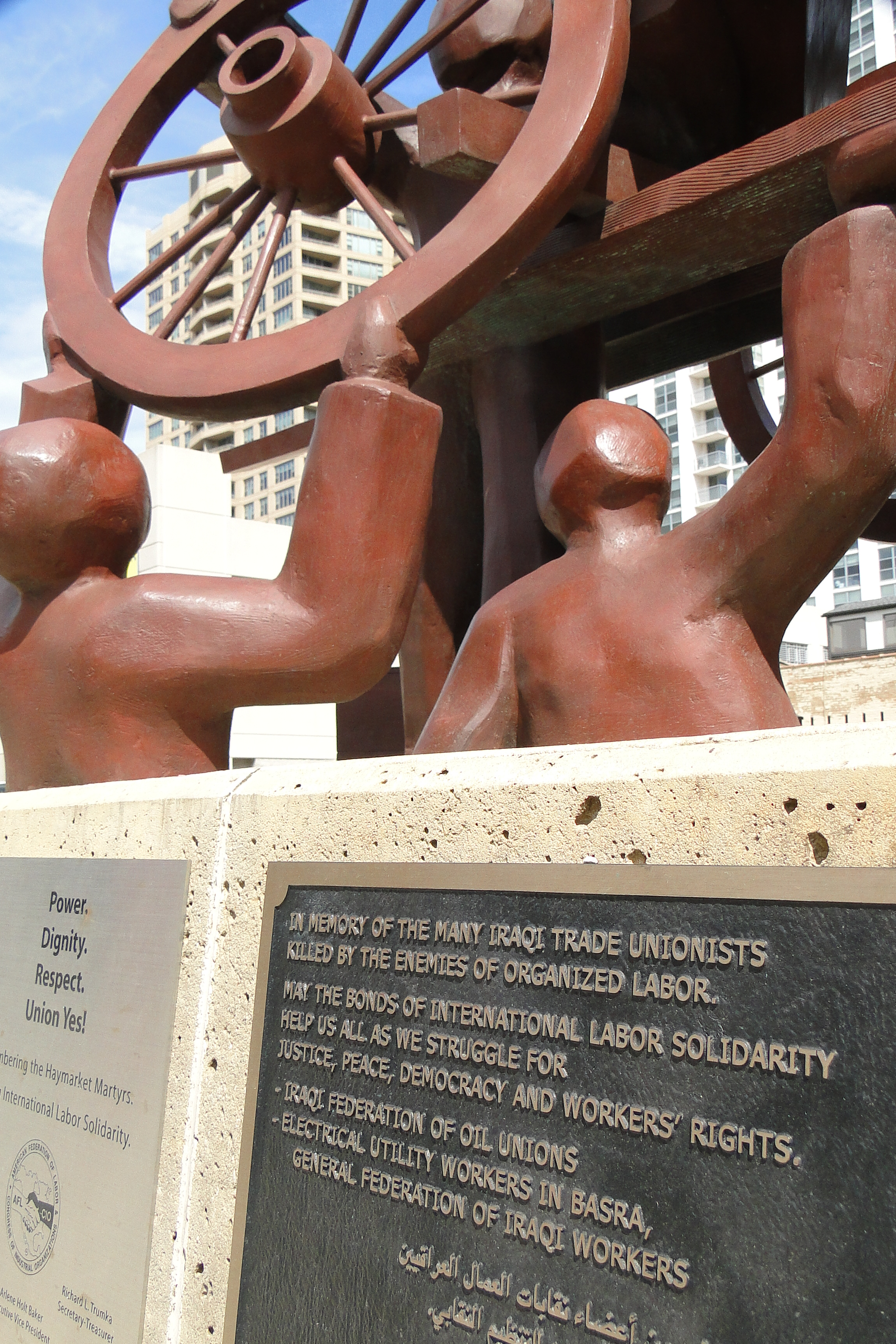
The monument

External image
- "Haymarket Memorial", Mary Brogger

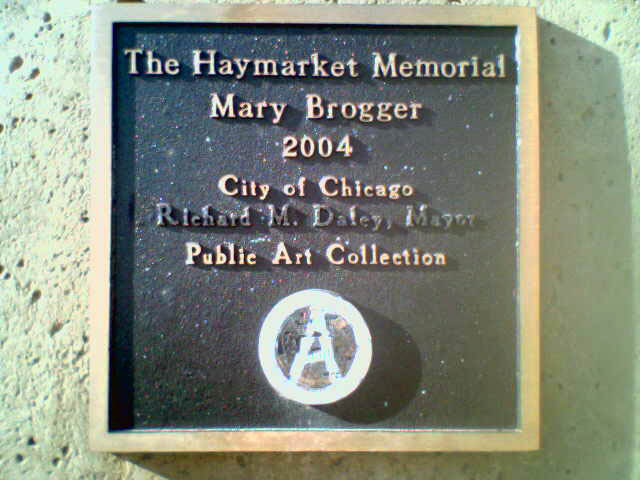
The marker under the Mary Brogger monument, vandalized

Chicago labor supporters called for a park at the site of the Haymarket riot as early as 1985 in commemoration of its 100th anniversary. Labor historians put a plaque at near the site in 1970 that was stolen soon after.

In September 2004, Daley and union leaders—including the president of Chicago's police union—unveiled a monument by Chicago artist Mary Brogger, a fifteen-foot speakers' wagon sculpture echoing the wagon on which the labor leaders stood in Haymarket Square to champion the eight-hour day. The 3,200-pound sculpture features a faceless human figure orating atop a wagon coming undone with additional faceless figures near or clutching the wagon. It sits on the site where a minister was giving a speech when the bomb went off. The sculpture was temporarily relocated in 2016 to avoid damage during construction at nearby buildings. The new construction created a small pocket park between the statue and a new apartment building.
