= James Cade =

Canadian actor

- Born: Toronto, Ontario, Canada
- Occupation: Actor

James Cade is a Canadian actor.

He graduated from the National Theatre School of Canada and has since then performed in several theatre productions in Toronto, including Single Threat's production of A Quiet Place. Other theatre companies Cade has worked with include Unspun Theatre, Crate Productions, Convergence Theatre and Native Earth Performing Arts.

== Filmography ==
=== Film ===
Year	Title	Role	Notes
2007	Personal Effects	Charlie	Short film
2007	Dakota	Alan Hawk	
2010	Surveillance	Suspect/Scientist	Short film
2011	Blink		Short film
2012	Antiviral	Levine	
2015	He Never Died		Short film
2015	Remember	Gun Shop Clerk	
2016	Blue Mountain State: The Rise of Thadland	Harmon Tedesco	
2016	Hacker	Chris	
2018	Arlo Alone		Short film
2018	The Go-Getters	Cerebral Paulie	
2020	Stardust	Marc Bolan	
2023	Cascade	Murph	

=== Television ===
Year	Title	Role	Notes
2003	Sue Thomas: F.B.Eye	Adam Davis	Episode: "Billy the Kid"
2009	Cold Blood	Andrew George	Episode: "Conspiracy"
2009	Warehouse 13	Donny	Episode: "Burnout"
2009	Reptisaurus	MP#1	Television movie
2009–2014	The Listener	Gun Dealer	2 episodes
2010–2011	Blue Mountain State	Harmon Tedesco	26 episodes
2011–2012	Lost Girl	Tryst	2 episodes
2012	The L.A. Complex	Daniel Diaz	2 episodes
2012	Rookie Blue	Alan Banks	Episode: "Coming Home"
2012	Dr. Bob's House	Gary Webster	TV series
2013	Copper	Officer Ray Coolin / Tough Copper	2 episodes
2014	The Strain	Roman	Episode: "The Third Rail"
2015	Gangland Undercover	Stash	6 episodes
2015	Murdoch Mysteries	Ted	Episode: "Nolo Contendere"
2015	Hemlock Grove	Bajram	3 episodes
2015	Saving Hope	Edward Barrett	Episode: "Rock and a Hard Place"
2016	Damien	Ed Bone	2 episodes
2016	Orphan Black	Tito	Episode: "The Antisocialism of Sex"
2016	Dark Matter	Danny Bones	Episode: "We Voted Not To Space You"
2016	Flower Shop Mysteries	Buzz	Episode: "Killer Arrangement"
2016	Private Eyes	Zach Beach	Episode: "Mise en Place"
2017	Incorporated	Seymour	Episode: "Operational Realignment"
2017	Played	Technician	Episode: "Played"
2018	Let's Get Physical	Clarence	7 episodes
2018	Crawford	Dale	2 episodes
2018	Condor	Pizza Delivery Man	Episode: "A Question of Compromise"
2019	Schitt's Creek	Blaire	Episode: "The Crowening"
2019	Designated Survivor	Myles Lee	5 episodes
2019	Jett	Wayne	2 episodes
2019	TallBoyz	Joseph	Episode: "Mind the mints"
2019	When Hope Calls	Russell Meeks	Episode: "Surprise"
2019	The Crossword Mysteries: A Puzzle to Die For	Jacob Morton	Television movie
2020	Dare Me	Cowboy	Episode: "Rapprochement"
2020	October Faction	Fish Man	Episode: "Nadir"
2021	Frankie Drake Mysteries	Gadabout / Arturo	2 episodes
2021	Hudson & Rex	Richie Turner	Episode: "Fanning the Flames"
2021	Coroner	Mason	Episode: "Round and Round"
2023	Pretty Hard Cases	Tommy	2 episodes
2023	Workin' Moms	—N/a	Producer; Episode: "The Sterilizer"
2024	Law & Order Toronto: Criminal Intent	Sean Grierson	Episode: "Minnow and the Shark"
2024	Star Trek: Discovery	Weapons Dealer	Episode: "Face the Strange"
2024	The Big Cigar	Agent Anderson	4 episodes
2025	Murdoch Mysteries	Constable Chester Gaines	Episode: "Unearthing the Past"
