= Whiskey Business (film) =

- Genre: Comedy
- Written by: Jed Elinoff; Scott Thomas
- Directed by: Robert Iscove
- Starring: Pauly Shore; Cynthia Preston; John Schneider; Tanya Tucker; Brad Borbridge; Ari Cohen
- Music by: Gary Koftinoff
- Country of origin: United States
- Original language: English

Production
- Executive producers: Margaret O'Brien; John Morayniss; Noreen Halpern; Ira Pincus; Lisa Silfen; Robin Palmer; Mary Beth Cunin; Lewis Bogach; Anne Oakley; Robert Iscove
- Producer: Noella Nesdoly
- Cinematography: Jim Westenbrink
- Editor: Stephen Lawrence
- Running time: 85 minutes
- Production company: Entertainment One Television

Original release
- Network: CMT
- Release: March 25, 2012

Whiskey Business is a 2012 American comedy television film directed by Robert Iscove and written by Jed Elinoff and Scott Thomas. The film stars Pauly Shore, Cynthia Preston, John Schneider, Tanya Tucker, Brad Borbridge and Ari Cohen. The film premiered on CMT on March 25, 2012.

== Plot ==
The son of a New Jersey mob boss is framed for a murder he didn't commit. He goes on the run and ends up in Tennessee where he bonds with the residents of a small town.

== Cast ==
- Pauly Shore as Nicky Ferelli
- Cynthia Preston as Jess
- John Schneider as Sheriff Gilly
- Tanya Tucker as Trina
- Brad Borbridge as Parnell
- Ari Cohen as Dino
- Nick Mancuso as Don Farelli
- Cedric Smith as Jack
- Daniel DeSanto as Joey Pipes
- Reid Janisse as Deputy
- Kayla Lorette as Denise
- Aurora Browne as Charmaine
