= Haymarket Square (Chicago) =

Urban square

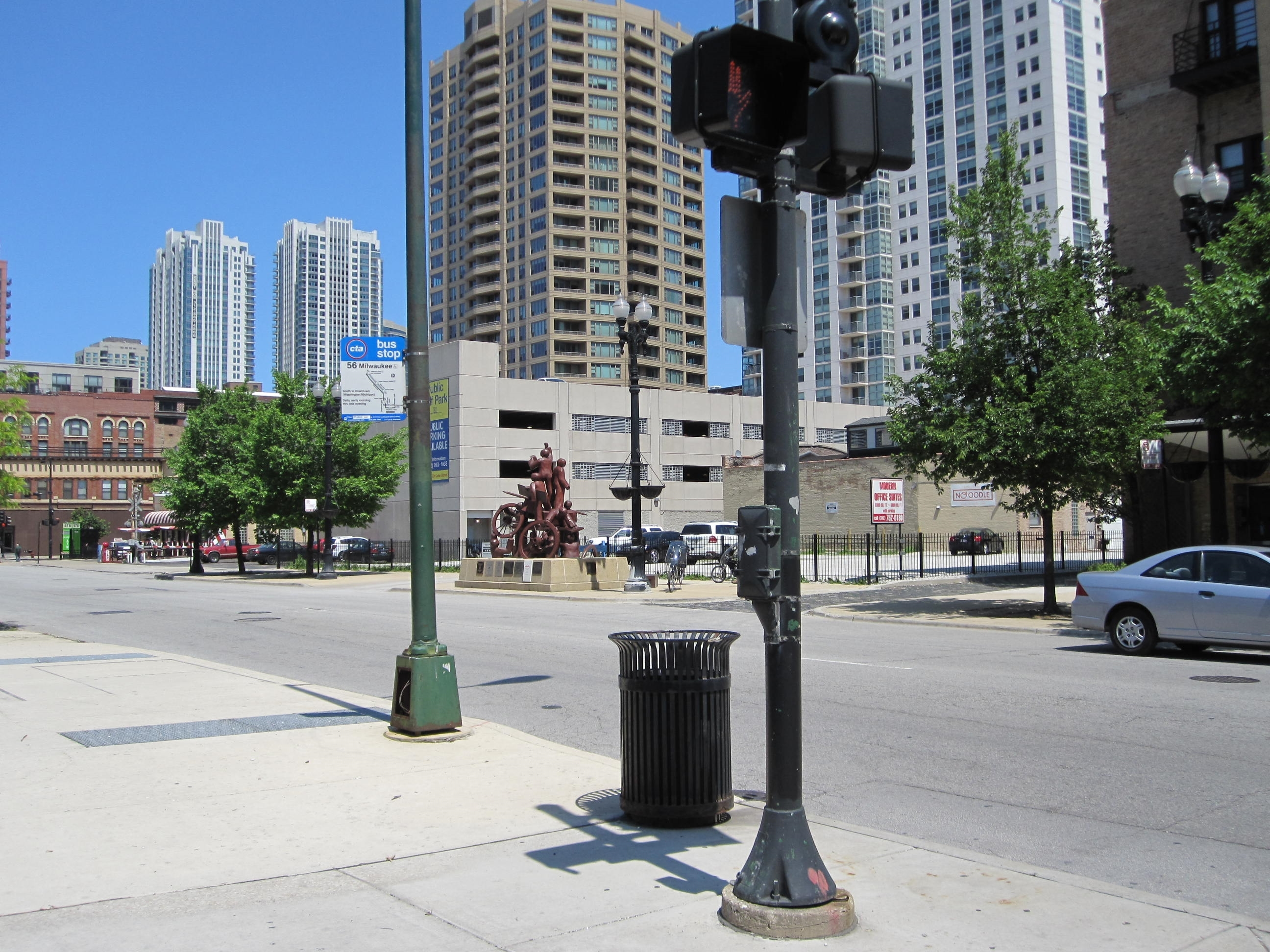
The square in 2012, with the Haymarket Memorial in the distant-center

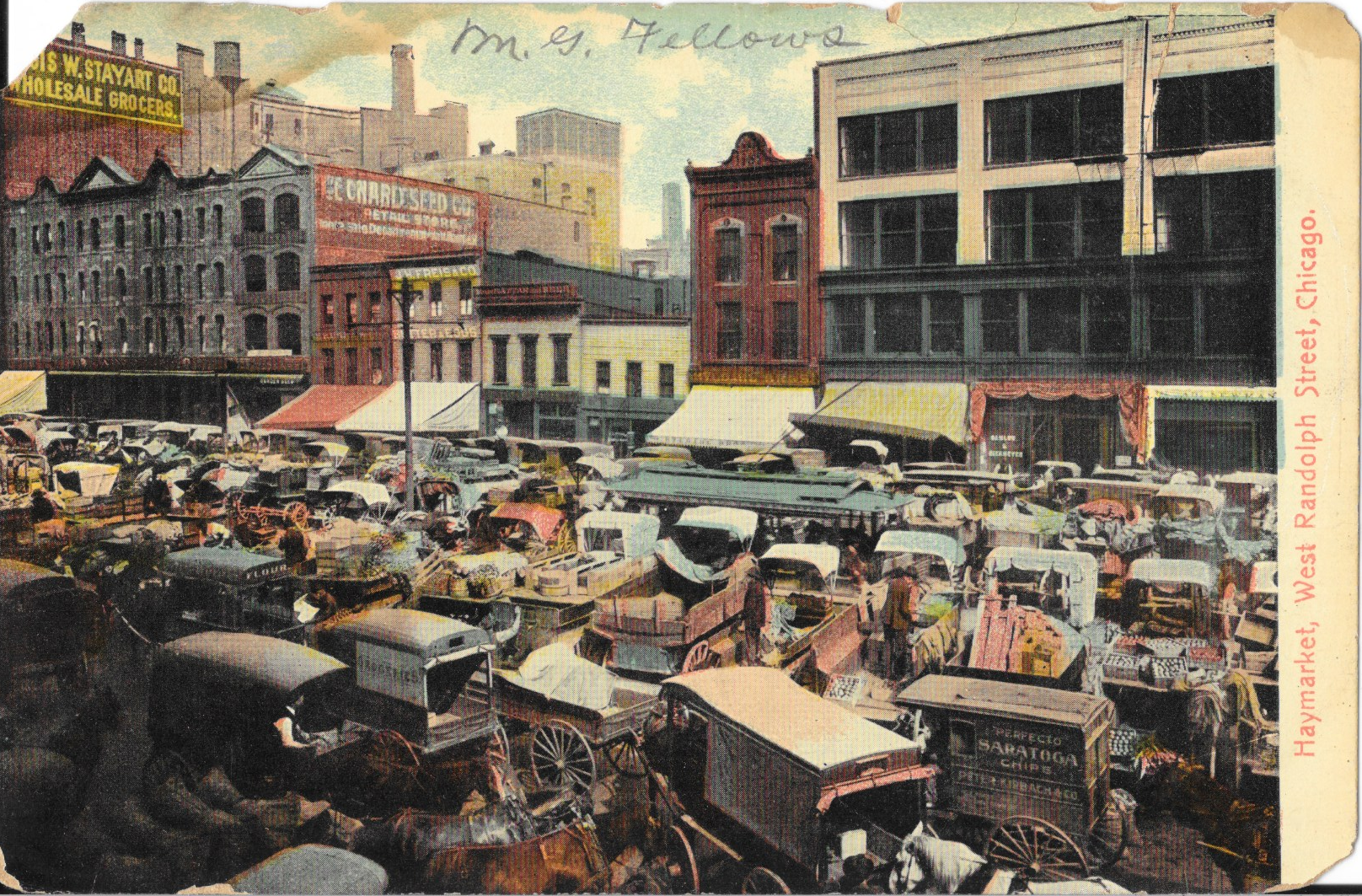
Haymarket square c. 1900

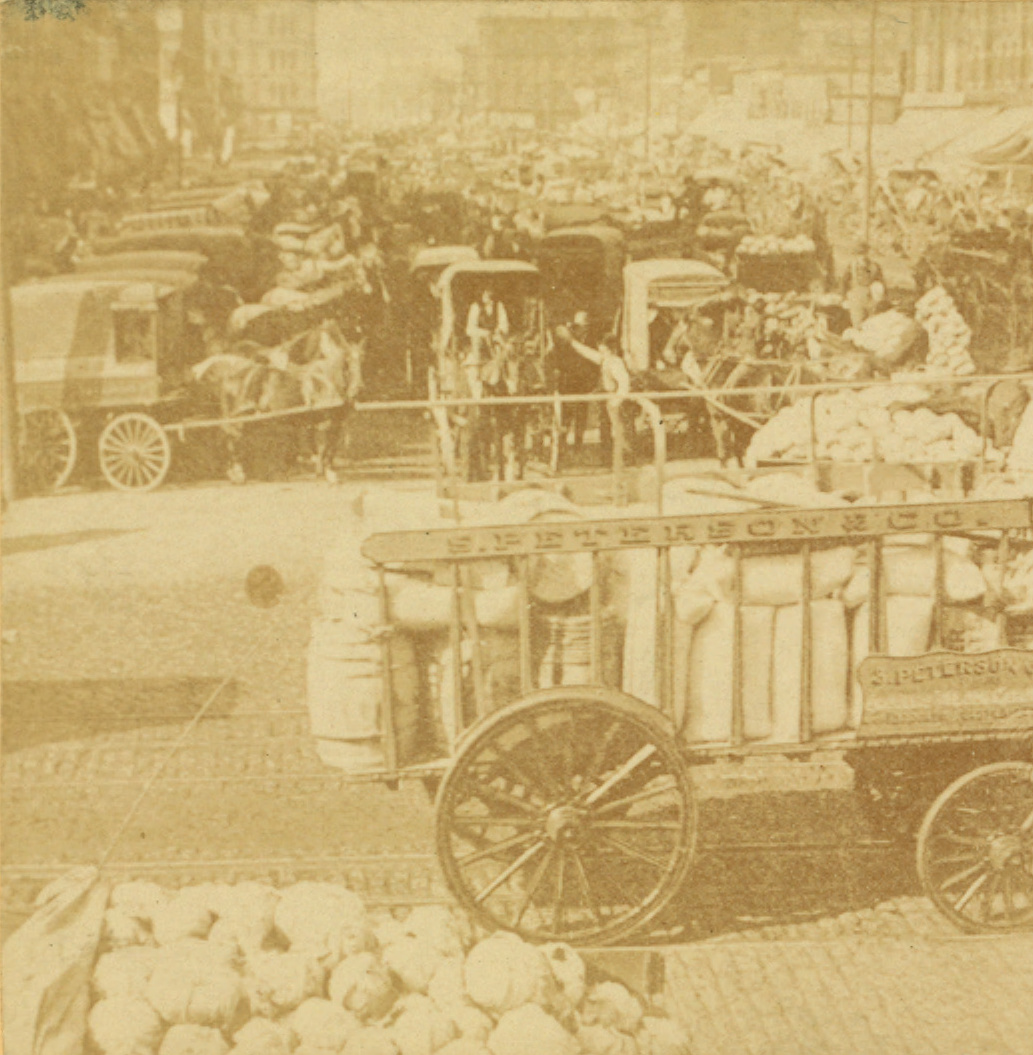
Another view of the square c. 1900

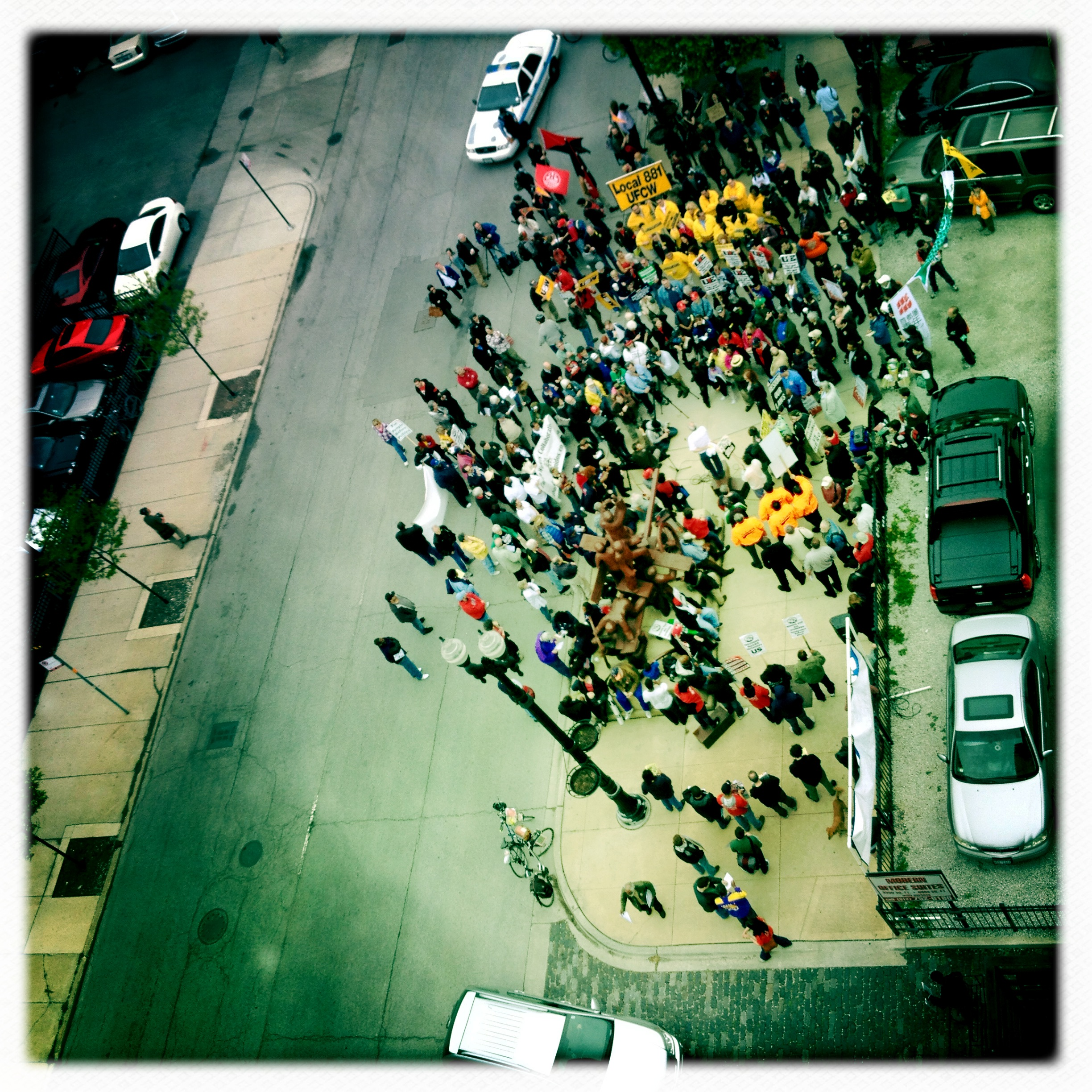
May Day attendees at the square in 2012.

Haymarket Square is a commercial area on the Near West Side of Chicago at Randolph Street and Des Plaines Street just east of Halsted Street, known primarily for the protest and bombing that occurred on May 4, 1886. It was a wide, busy commercial food produce market for much of the 19th and early 20th centuries. The square is a tourist destination, and is often a rally point for various unions and political groups and individuals.

The Haymarket Memorial sculpture was dedicated in 2004 on the site where the 1886 protest speaker's wagon was located.
