= Let's Get Physical (TV series) =

- Genre: Sitcom
- Created by: Ben Newmark; Dan Newmark; Connor Pritchard
- Starring: Matt Jones; Misha Rasaiah; AnnaLynne McCord; Chris Diamantopoulos; Jane Seymour; Jahmil French; James Cade; Dylan Bailey
- Composer: Jim McGrath
- Country of origin: United States
- Original language: English
- No. of seasons: 1
- No. of episodes: 8

Production
- Executive producers: Ben Newmark; Dan Newmark; Connor Pritchard; Jocelyn Hamilton; Armand Leo; Jeff Lynas; John Morayniss; Michael Rosenberg
- Producer: Ginny Jones-Duzak
- Running time: 22 minutes
- Production companies: Grandma's House Entertainment; Rosey TV; Entertainment One Television

Original release
- Network: Pop
- Release: January 24 – March 14, 2018

Let's Get Physical is an American television sitcom created by Ben Newmark, Dan Newmark and Connor Pritchard. The series stars Matt Jones, Misha Rasaiah, AnnaLynne McCord, Chris Diamantopoulos, Jane Seymour, Jahmil French, James Cade and Dylan Bailey. The series premiered on Pop on January 24, 2018.

== Cast ==
- Matt Jones as Joe Force
- Misha Rasaiah as Tina Gray
- AnnaLynne McCord as Claudia
- Chris Diamantopoulos as Barry Cross
- Jane Seymour as Janet
- Jahmil French as Snacks
- James Cade as Clarence
- Dylan Bailey as Chad R.
- Lee J. Campbell as Colonel Force
- David Rossetti as Andre
- Rhys Bevan-John as Gout
- Michael Ratchford as Rick
- Adrian Choong as Chad P.
- Kristin Langille as Denise

== Episodes ==
No.	Title	Directed by	Written by	Original release date	Prod. code	US viewers (millions)
1	"Winner's Blood"	Brian K. Roberts	Ben Newmark, Dan Newmark & Connor Pritchard	January 24, 2018	101	0.099
2	"The Dancing Criminals"	Brian K. Roberts	Ben Newmark, Dan Newmark & Connor Pritchard	January 31, 2018	102	0.124
3	"What's in the Box"	James Allodi	Ben Newmark, Dan Newmark & Connor Pritchard	February 7, 2018	103	0.108
4	"Lycra-Virgin"	James Allodi	Jessica Conrad	February 14, 2018	104	0.036
5	"Paybacks a Bitch"	James Genn	Story by : Howie E. Kremer; Teleplay by : Howie E. Kremer & Tom Brady	February 21, 2018	105	0.062
6	"The Double-Double Cross"	James Genn	Kevin Townsley & Connor Pritchard	February 28, 2018	106	0.081
7	"Angel Barry"	Unknown	Unknown	March 7, 2018	107	0.071
8	"CAC Fight!"	Unknown	Unknown	March 14, 2018	108	0.055
