= Vagos Motorcycle Club =

One percenter motorcycle club

Vagos MC
- Abbreviation: 22, Green Nation
- Founded: 1966
- Type: Outlaw motorcycle club
- Region served: Western United States, northern Mexico, Canada, and Serbia, Europe
- Members: 300-600 full-patch members

The Vagos Motorcycle Club, also known as the Green Nation, is a one percenter motorcycle club formed in the 1960s in San Bernardino, California. The club's insignia is Loki, the Norse god of mischief, riding a motorcycle. Members typically wear green. The Vagos is regarded as one of the largest and most powerful one-percenter biker gangs in the United States.

The Vagos have approximately 300-600 members among 200 chapters located in the states of Arizona, California, Hawaii, Idaho, Illinois, Nevada, Oregon, Utah and Missouri, as well as chapters throughout Europe and ten chapters located in Mexico (Baja California, Jalisco and Mexico City, CraZZy Centro). Vagos in Ontario, Canada were reported to have patched over to Outlaws Motorcycle Club (American Outlaws Association) in 2015 before AOA disbanded in 2018. Two hundred members are in Inland Empire, where the club was started in the late 1960s.

In 2013, the Vagos expanded to Sweden.

In 2023, the Vagos were listed as one of five major gangs in Thailand.

== Insignia ==
A member from the Berdoo chapter (slang for San Bernardino) created a patch while he was in prison featuring Loki, the Norse god of mischief. Vago is Spanish for vagabond or wanderer. Their denim jackets sport their top rockers with their club name integrated into the middle patch, and bottom rockers with their chapter's region or state, such as "SO. CAL", "California", or "Arizona". The middle patch "depicts a muscle-bound caricature of the Norse god of mischief, Loki, set against a green field". Loki is colored red on top of a bike with his hands holding up their club name. Other patches the club wears are the number 22 (the 22nd letter of the alphabet, V, for Vagos), and a Loki head. An MF patch (meaning motorcycle family), is received by a member after a probationary period is over and the member is validated as a member of the Vagos family on the front. Some members have been seen with a green swastika and an "SS" symbol on their jackets.

== Official chapters ==
The Vagos have Chapters all throughout Southern California. They have Chapters in Venice Beach, California to the High Desert of California, Inland Empire which includes both Riverside County, California and San Bernardino County, California in the city of San Bernardino where they started, Azusa California San Gabriel Valley chapter, Hawthorne, Los Angeles and San Diego. They also have chapters in the states of Hawaii, Oregon, Nevada, and Utah, Arizona, Georgia, New York, Missouri, New Mexico, Idaho, Texas, Illinois also the country of Mexico, Mexicali BC Mother Chapter, Tijuana chapter, Tecate Centro, Rumorosa, Rosarito Beach, México City, CraZZy Centro, Azcapotzalco. Also in Central America in Nicaragua, El Salvador, Honduras, and Guatemala. In South America there are Chapters in Brazil, Chile, Costa Rica and Ecuador. Chapters in Europe are in Germany (2 Chapters, South-West and Steel Legion), Ireland, France, Belgium (2 Chapters Liege and Mons)

== Vagos MC criminal allegations and incidents ==
The Vagos are considered by law enforcement to be among the many second-tier, after the "Big Four", outlaw motorcycle gangs.

=== Hemet traps ===
On March 17, 2010, amid allegations that Vagos members had fabricated home-made booby traps to maim and kill police detectives in Hemet, California, police arrested at least 30 Vagos members in a multi-state raid of Utah, Nevada, Arizona, and California, involving 400 police officers from 60 law-enforcement agencies. The police raided 73 locations in Southern California, seizing weapons and drugs, and discovered a meth lab. The raids were the result of several incidents involving booby traps where the club was implicated:

- On December 31, 2009, the unmarked headquarters of the Hemet Gang Task Force was filled with natural gas, which had been routed into the building through a hole drilled in the roof. Two task force members had detected the gas and backed away without triggering the explosion. The day before that attack, a Vagos funeral was held at a church next to the office.
- On February 23, 2010, a task force member opened a security gate outside the building, causing a homemade zip gun attached to the gate to fire, nearly hitting his head.
- On March 5, a task force member who had parked an unmarked police car in front of a convenience store in Hemet found a homemade pipe bomb hidden underneath the vehicle.

California and federal authorities announced a $200,000 reward for information on these cases. California Attorney General Jerry Brown called the attempts "urban terrorism." Riverside County District Attorney Rod Pacheco said that Vagos members posed an "extreme threat" to law enforcement officers and were notorious for trying to "infiltrate" public safety agencies, by obtaining sworn or non-sworn positions and working undercover to obstruct and dismantle police investigations.

In March 2011, the club sued Riverside County law enforcement for defamation and damages caused by implicating the group to the attacks on the Hemet police officers. On August 1, Riverside County settled the lawsuit, and cleared the club of any involvement with the attacks on the officers. Meanwhile, they had arrested two men that had no ties to the club. The club's attorney, Joseph Yanny, stated he was pleased with the result: "This was never about money. What was important was that the club clear its name and take this shadow off them."

=== Nugget Casino shooting ===
On September 23, 2011, Vagos members were involved in a shooting at John Ascuaga's Nugget in Sparks, Nevada, where Jeffrey Pettigrew, the president of the San Jose, California chapter of Hells Angels was killed, and Vagos members were wounded. The next day, a Vagos member was wounded at a rally by a drive-by shooter. On September 29, police arrested Ernesto Manuel Gonzales, a Vagos member, at the University of California, San Francisco, for killing Pettigrew. On December 7, police announced that they had arrested Gary Rudnick, the vice-president of the Los Angeles chapter of Vagos, for instigating the fight that led to the shooting. Rudnick later pleaded guilty to second degree murder in a bargaining agreement. The trial for the two Vagos members, as well as a Hells Angels member who fired at a crowd, was held on October 29, 2012.

=== Other incidents ===
In 1974, four Vagos members were convicted and sentenced to death for murdering University of New Mexico student William Velten. The four, Richard Greer, Ronald Keine, Clarence Smith and Thomas Gladish, spent 17 months on death row, but during the appeals process, Kerry Rodney Lee confessed to the murder.

In October 1998, police arrested more than a dozen Vagos members for kidnapping, drug and weapons crimes, following a two-year undercover investigation. In September 2004, state police arrested 26 members and seized more than $125,000 in cash, drugs and guns. On March 9, 2006, law enforcement conducted "Operation 22 Green", which involved 700 personnel from Bureau of Alcohol, Tobacco, Firearms and Explosives and local police and sheriff's departments. The operation resulted in the arrest of 25 Vagos members and associates for violating firearms and drugs policies. It was "one of the largest coordinated law enforcement probes ever conducted in Southern California". The investigators seized 95 illegal firearms, illegal drugs, $6,000 cash, and two stolen motorcycles. An ATF agent called the group a "ruthless criminal bike gang" that deals in "guns, drugs, and death." Operation 22 Green and its lead-up were used as the basis for the first season of the television series Gangland Undercover.

In December 2007, police arrested six Vagos members for "charges of first-degree burglary, second-degree robbery, coercion and second-degree kidnapping" that occurred in August 2007. The victim had announced he was leaving the club, but suffered a beating at the Custom Motorcycle auto shop in Grants Pass, Oregon, and was then taken to his home where they attempted to rob him they failed.

Three Vagos members were arrested on June 9 and 10, 2009, and charged with sexually assaulting a woman in San Jose, California. Police investigators told the San Jose Mercury News that the victim met the three men in a nightclub on May 4, 2009, and that they had offered to drive her home, but instead they took her to the Vagos clubhouse on Kings Row where she was beaten and sexually assaulted.

On August 13, 2011, law enforcement authorities reported that the Vagos Motorcycle Club and the Galloping Goose Motorcycle Club were involved in a shootout which shut down traffic on I-44 near Waynesville, Missouri. The local 9-1-1 center received about 20 calls, which reported that approximately 20 men were fighting, and that shots had been fired.
