= Ari Cohen =

Canadian actor

Ari Cohen (born in Winnipeg, Manitoba) is a Canadian stage and television actor. He was a cast member of My Babysitter's a Vampire. He is from Winnipeg and attended the University of Manitoba, where he was an alumnus of the Black Hole Theatre Company.

Cohen is active in Canadian theatre, having worked with the Soulpepper Theatre Company (as Biff in Arthur Miller's Death of a Salesman and as Bobby Gould in David Mamet's Speed-the-Plow, both 2012), with the Harold Green Jewish Theatre Company (as uncle Louie in Neil Simon's Lost in Yonkers), as well as with the Vancouver Playhouse Theatre Company and many others.

== On screen ==
Year	Title	Role	Notes
1991	Archangel	Philbin	Film, dir: Guy Maddin
1992	True Confections	Boy	TV movie
1993	For the Moment	Cecil	Film
1997	Too Close to Home	Officer	TV movie
1998	Naked City: Justice with a Bullet	P.A. Officer	TV movie
1999	Deep in the City	Videographer	TV series (1 ep.)
1999	Twice in a Lifetime	Adult Axel	TV series (1 ep.)
1999	Black and Blue	Carl Carter	TV movie (uncredited)
2000	The Famous Jett Jackson	Director	TV series (1 ep.)
2000	Bruiser	Caller #1	Film, dir: George A. Romero
2000	Relic Hunter	Roger Penrose	TV series (1 ep.)
2001	A Glimpse of Hell	TV Reporter #2	TV movie
2001	Dangerous Child	Guidance Counselor	TV movie
2001	Blue Murder	Michael Tyner	TV series (1 ep.)
2002	Gilda Radner: It's Always Something	Lorne Michaels	TV movie
2002	The Man Who Saved Christmas	Frank Gilbert	TV movie
2004	The L Word	Conrad Voynow	TV series (recurring)
2004	The Days	Male Lawyer	TV series (2 eps.)
2004	Stargate: Atlantis	Tyrus	TV series (1 ep.)
2004	Category 6: Day of Destruction	Dan London	TV movie
2005	The Tournament	Stan Ryckman	TV series (1 ep.)
2005	Ladies Night	Howell	TV movie
2005	Andromeda	Zayas	TV series (1 ep.)
2006	A Little Thing Called Murder	Matthew Weissman	TV movie
2006	The Evidence	Daniel Lloyd	TV series (1 ep.)
2006	Supernatural	Miles Tarnower	TV series (1 ep.)
2006	A Job to Kill For	Patrick Kamplen	TV movie
2006	Saved	Nick Neuwirth	TV series (2 eps.)
2006	Not My Life	Steve Morgan	TV movie
2007	The Tracey Fragments	Mr. Berkowitz	Film, dir: Bruce McDonald
2007	Hush Little Baby	Peter	TV movie
2007	Kaya	Trip Thayer	TV series (1 ep.)
2008	Love Sick	Steven	TV movie
2008–2009	Smallville	Regan Matthews	TV series (recurring)
2009	Defying Gravity	David Sellner	TV series (1 ep.)
2010	The Border	Special Agent Kurt Sauls	TV series (1 ep.)
2010	Living in Your Car	Dr. Reinwood	TV series (2 eps.)
2010	Rookie Blue	Paul Wright	TV series (1 ep.)
2010	Small Town Murder Songs	Detective Washington	Film, dir: Ed Gass-Donnelly
2010	My Babysitter's a Vampire	Ross Morgan	TV movie
2011	Poe	Officer Moore	TV movie
2011	Republic of Doyle	Justin Slade	TV series (1 ep.)
2011	King	Jim Lowell	TV series (2 eps.)
2011	Haven	Anson Shumway	TV series (1 ep.)
2011	Suits	Detective Packel	TV series (1 ep.)
2011	Lost Girl	Brikram	TV series (1 ep.)
2011	Flashpoint	Martin Varran	TV series (1 ep.)
2011	Against the Wall	Kevin Proud	TV series (1 ep.)
2011–2012	My Babysitter's a Vampire	Ross Morgan	TV series (cast member)
2012	The Firm	Detective William Quinn	TV series (2 eps.)
2012	Whiskey Business	Dino	TV movie
2014	Maps to the Stars	Jeb Berg	
2015-2016	Gangland Undercover	Mike "Koz" Kozinski	TV series
Shoot the Messenger	Sam Charles	TV series (cast member)	
Quantico	Dan Berlin	TV series (1 ep.)	
Shadowhunters	Theo	TV series (1 ep.)	
2017	Gangland Undercover	Koz (Ziggy)	Season 2
2017	It	Rabbi Uris	
2017	Molly's Game	NY Player	
2018	Mouthpiece	Chris	
2019	It Chapter Two	Rabbi Uris (flashbacks)	
2019	Spiral	Aaron	
2023	Priscilla	Captain Beaulieu	
