= Jahmil French =

Canadian actor (1991–2021)

- Born: July 29, 1991; Toronto, Ontario, Canada
- Died: March 1, 2021 (aged 29)
- Occupation: Actor
- Years active: 2009–2019

Jahmil French (July 29, 1991 – March 1, 2021) was a Canadian actor, most noted for his role as Dave Turner in Degrassi: The Next Generation (2009–2013).

== Early life ==
Jahmil French was born on July 29, 1991 in Toronto, Ontario, Canada to an African-Caribbean couple. He went to Vradenburg Elementary School, where he performed in the play "Name of the tree" based on an illustrated book. He attended the Wexford Collegiate School for the Arts in Scarborough, Ontario.

He was an only child.

== Career ==
French made his television debut in 2009, guest starring on the CTV/CBS police procedural series Flashpoint. The episode would earn him a Best Performance in a TV Series - Guest Starring Young Actor 14 and Over nomination at the Young Artist Awards.

From 2009 to 2013, French starred as Dave Turner on the Much/TeenNick teen drama series Degrassi: The Next Generation. During his time on the show, he earned a nomination from the Canadian Screen Awards for Best Performance in a Children's or Youth Program or Series.

In 2014, he starred alongside Nia Long in the American legal drama The Divide.

In 2016, he joined the cast of the television series The Infamous as Luke Ward, however the series was passed on by A&E. It was not picked up by any other network.

He appeared in Pop TV's 2018 series Let's Get Physical as Snacks.

French was in the film Boost, for which he was nominated for Best Supporting Actor at the 6th Canadian Screen Awards and as well as at the Prix Iris in 2018.

His final TV role was in Netflix's musical drama series Soundtrack as ex-felon Dante Sands.

== Death ==
French died on March 1, 2021, at the age of 29. Neither the circumstances nor the cause of his death were disclosed.

=== Legacy ===
In 2021, the Armstrong Acting studio announced the "Jahmil French Legacy" scholarship in memory of French and his work with the studio.

At its inaugural ceremony in 2022, the Legacy Awards introduced the Jahmil French award. The award is meant to recognize rising Black stars in Canadian media.

== Filmography ==
=== Film ===
Year	Title	Role	Notes
2012	Jamestown	Duane	Short film
2013	Detention	Jeremy	Short film
2016	Boost	Anthony "A-Mac" Macdonald	
2018	At First Light	Nathan	
2018	TMI Crossing the Threshold	James Langston	
2019	Dalia	Rock	Short film

=== Television ===
Year	Title	Role	Notes
2009	Flashpoint	Matt Medeiros	Episode: "Exit Wounds"
2009–2010	Degrassi: Minis	Dave Turner	7 episodes
2009–2013	Degrassi: The Next Generation	Dave Turner	Main cast
2014	The Divide	Trey Page	7 episodes
2014	A Day Late and a Dollar Short	Dingus	TV film
2014	Rocky Road	Razor	TV film
2015	Lead with Your Heart	Jackson	TV film
2015	Remedy	PJ Byrd	7 episodes
2016	Incorporated	Spider	Episode: "Cost Containment"
2016	The Night Before Halloween	Kyle	TV film
2018	Let's Get Physical	Snacks	7 episodes
2019	Soundtrack	Dante Mendoza	10 episodes

== Awards and nominations ==
Year	Award	Category	Work	Result	Ref.
2010	Young Artist Awards	Best Performance in a TV Series - Guest Starring Young Actor 14 and Over	Flashpoint (Episode: "Perfect Storm")	Nominated	
2013	Canadian Screen Awards	Best Performance in a Children's or Youth Program or Series	Degrassi: The Next Generation (Episode: "Smash Into You")	Nominated	
2018	Canadian Screen Awards	Performance by an Actor in a Supporting Role	Boost	Nominated	
2018	Prix Iris	Best Performance by an Actor in Supporting Role	Boost	Nominated	
