= Publishers Marketplace =

Publishing news website

- Founded: 2001
- Headquarters: Bronxville, New York
- Country of origin: United States
- Founder: Michael Cader
- Website: publishersmarketplace.com

Publishers Marketplace is a publishing industry news website. The website is known for its announcements of recent book deals and also operates the Publishers Lunch newsletter, which provides daily news updates on the publishing industry.

== History ==
In April 2000, Michael Cader, owner of the book packaging company Cader Books, founded the Publishers Lunch email newsletter. The Publishers Marketplace website was launched in November 2001. For much of their early history, Publishers Marketplace and Publishers Lunch were a one-person operation by Cader himself.

As of 2024, Publishers Marketplace was based in Bronxville, New York with five full-time employees, publishing approximately 14,000 book deal announcements per year. The website reports that its Publishers Lunch newsletter has roughly 45,000 subscribers.

== Overview ==
Publishers Marketplace's subscribers include industry professionals such as literary agents and editors, as well as authors themselves. A monthly subscription to the website provides news about book deal announcements, as well as a deluxe version of the Publishers Lunch newsletter and access to past issues. Users can also subscribe to BookScan, a service for book sales data, through the website. Authors can use Publishers Marketplace to search for and view agents and their previous book deals, helping them evaluate whether an agent is a good fit.

Publishers Marketplace uses a consistent format for its book deal announcements that includes the title, author, publisher, agent, acquiring editor, and a "logline" that summarizes the book's contents. The website uses certain language to indicate how much the publisher paid for the deal:

- "Nice deal": Up to $49,000.
- "Very nice deal": Between $50,000 and $99,000.
- "Good deal": Between $100,000 and $250,000.
- "Significant deal": Between $251,000 and $499,000.
- "Major deal": $500,000 or more.

Announcing book deals on Publishers Marketplace is voluntary, as is mentioning the size of the deal. The website sells a one-time 24-hour pass for authors who want to view their own book deal announcement. Many authors share a screenshot of their book deal announcement on social media, viewing it as proof of their success, a status symbol, or a form of self-marketing.

== Reception ==
John Rodzvilla, in the Journal of Scholarly Publishing, said that Publishers Marketplace and Publishers Lunch "offer information unavailable through other news outlets on bookselling and the financial dealings within the trade book world." Jordan Michelman of The Atlantic said that for authors, posting a Publishers Marketplace screenshot had "become one of the most important rites of passage in the book-publication process—more meaningful to some writers than a book party or book-cover reveal."

Literary agent Julie Barer called Publishers Marketplace "a very useful tool", but added that it "perpetuates this hugely obsessive cycle of compare and despair" for writers. Courtney E. Martin, in The Writer, said that the website was worthwhile "if you need a good, jealousy-inducing kick in the pants".

Nicki Porter, also in The Writer, wrote that Publishers Marketplace was "widely considered to be one of the best—and many would argue the best—resources for agent research". Literary agent Kirby Kim said that the website was "probably the most comprehensive and up-to-date way of seeing who agents are representing and how active they are."
