= Journal of Scholarly Publishing =

- Discipline: Academic publishing
- Language: English
- Edited by: Alex Holzman, Robert Brown

Publication details
- History: 1969-present
- Publisher: University of Toronto Press (Canada)
- Frequency: Quarterly

Standard abbreviations
- ISO 4: J. Sch. Publ.

Indexing
- ISSN: 1198-9742 (print); 1710-1166 (web)

Links
- Journal homepage

The Journal of Scholarly Publishing is a quarterly peer-reviewed academic journal publishing research and resources for publishers, editors, authors, and marketers in the academic publishing industry, focusing on technological changes, funding, and issues affecting scholarly publishing. It is published by the University of Toronto Press four times a year.

== Abstracting and indexing ==
The journal is abstracted and indexed in:

- Academic Search Alumni Edition
- Academic Search
- Applied Science & Technology Source
- Arts & Humanities Citation Index
- Book Review Digest Plus
- China Education Publications Import & Export Corporation (CEPIEC)
- Communication Abstracts * Computers & Applied Sciences Complete
- Cultures, Langues, Textes: La revue de sommaires
- Current Contents—Arts and Humanities
- Current Contents—Social & Behavioral Sciences
- EJS EBSCO Electronic Journals Service
- Information Science and Technology Abstracts
- JCR: Social Science Edition
- LISA: Library and Information Science Abstracts
- Library, Information Science & Technology Abstracts
- Library Literature & Information Science Index
- Microsoft Academic Search
- MLA International Bibliography
- Project MUSE
- Scopus
- Social Sciences Citation Index
