= Craig Wilson (columnist) =

American writer

- Born: Medina, NY
- Occupation: columnist
- Relatives: June Wilson mother
- Website: www.usatoday.com

Craig Wilson is an American writer who was a columnist for USA Today. He was a feature writer at the newspaper for over two decades. He wrote his The Final Word column each Wednesday from 2000 to 2013. He is also the author of It's the Little Things: An Appreciation of Life's Simple Pleasures (Random House, ISBN 0-375-75896-8).

Prior to joining USA Today, Wilson was a columnist for the Saratogian in Saratoga Springs, New York.

He was an AFS Intercultural Programs exchange student to Great Britain in 1966.

In 2013, he left USA Today after a buyout.
