= List of books about anarchism =

This is a chronological list of both fictional and non-fictional books written about anarchism. This list includes books that advocate for anarchism as well as those that criticize or oppose it. For ease of access, this list provides a link to the full text whenever possible, as well as the audiobook version as an aid for the visually impaired.

== Chronological list ==
Published	Title	Author(s)	Genre	School of thought / Theme
1793	Enquiry Concerning Political Justice and its Influence on General Virtue and Happiness	William Godwin	Non-fiction	Philosophical anarchism, Individualism
1840	What is Property? Or, an Inquiry into the Principle of Right and of Government	Pierre-Joseph Proudhon	Non-fiction	"Property is theft"
1844	The Ego and Its Own	Max Stirner	Non-fiction	Egoism
1845	The Unconstitutionality of Slavery	Lysander Spooner	Non-fiction	Constitutionalism, Slavery
1846	System of Economical Contradictions; Or, The Philosophy of Misery	Pierre-Joseph Proudhon	Non-fiction	Mutualism
1846	Poverty: Its Illegal Causes and Legal Cure	Lysander Spooner	Non-fiction	Individualism, Poverty
1850	The World's First Anarchist Manifesto	Anselme Bellegarrigue	Non-fiction: Manifesto	Anarchism in France, Individualist anarchism
1851	The General Idea of the Revolution in the Nineteenth Century	Pierre-Joseph Proudhon	Non-fiction	Pierre-Joseph Proudhon, Mutualism
1851	The Science of Society	Stephen Pearl Andrews	Non-fiction	Society, Individual sovereignty
1853	The Philosophy of Progress	Pierre-Joseph Proudhon	Non-fiction	Anarchism, Progress
1858	The Humanisphere: Anarchic Utopia	Joseph Déjacque	Fiction: Novel	Anarcho-communism, Utopianism
1863	The Federative Principle and the Need to Reconstitute the Party of Revolution	Pierre-Joseph Proudhon	Non-fiction	Federalism, Mutualism
1870	Mutual Banking	William Batchelder Greene	Non-fiction	Mutualism
1873	A New Banking System: The Needful Capital for Rebuilding the Burnt District	Lysander Spooner	Non-fiction	Mutualism
1873	Statism and Anarchy	Mikhail Bakunin	Non-fiction	Anarchism in Russia
1882	God and the State	Mikhail Bakunin (Note: God and the State is an unfinished work which was published posthumously.)	Non-fiction	Anti-statism, Critical of Christianity
1884	Between Peasants	Errico Malatesta	Non-fiction	Anarcho-communism
1885	Words of a Rebel	Peter Kropotkin	Non-fiction	Revolution, Anarchist communism
1887	Economic Equities: A Compend of the Natural Laws of Industrial Production	Joshua K. Ingalls	Non-fiction	Mutualism
1890	News from Nowhere	William Morris	Fiction	Libertarian socialism
1890	The Economics of Anarchy: A Study of the Industrial Type	Dyer Lum	Non-fiction	Market anarchism
1891	L'anarchia (Anarchy)	Errico Malatesta	Non-fiction	Anarchism in Italy, Anarcho-communism
1891	El Filibusterismo	Jose Rizal	Fiction	Revolutionary terror
1891	Contemporary Socialism	John Rae	Non-fiction	Revolutionary socialism
1891	The Anarchists: A Picture of Civilization at the Close of the Nineteenth Century	John Henry Mackay	Fiction	Anarchism in Germany, Individualist anarchism
1892	The Conquest of Bread	Peter Kropotkin	Non-fiction	Anarcho-communism
1893	Moribund Society and Anarchy	Jean Grave	Non-fiction	Anarcho-communism
1894	The Kingdom of God Is Within You	Leo Tolstoy	Non-fiction	Christian anarchism
1896	Voluntary Socialism	Francis Dashwood Tandy	Non-fiction	Mutualism
1899	Fields, Factories, and Workshops	Peter Kropotkin	Non-fiction	Anarcho-communism
1899	Memoirs of a Revolutionist	Peter Kropotkin	Non-fiction: Autobiography	Anarchism in Russia, Anarcho-communism
1900	Anarchism	Paul Eltzbacher	Non-fiction	History of anarchism
1902	Mutual Aid: A Factor of Evolution	Peter Kropotkin	Non-fiction: Essay collection	Anarcho-communism
1902	Anarchism and Other Essays	Emma Goldman	Non-fiction: Collection of essays	Anarcha-feminism
1905	The Philosophy of Egoism	James L. Walker	Non-fiction	Egoist anarchism
1908	Modern Science and Anarchism	Peter Kropotkin	Non-fiction	Anarcho-communism
1909	The Great French Revolution 1789–1793	Peter Kropotkin	Non-fiction: History	French Revolution
1910–1940	Seven Years Buried Alive and Other Writings (2013)	Biofilo Panclasta	Non-fiction: Collection of essays	Individualist anarchism, Anarchism in Colombia
1912	Sabotage	Émile Pouget	Non-fiction	Revolutionary syndicalism
1915	Ideals and Realities in Russian Literature	Peter Kropotkin	Non-fiction	Russian literature, Culture of Russia
1916	The Economics of Liberty	John Beverley Robinson	Non-fiction	Mutualism, Anarchism in the United States
1919	Critique of the German Intelligentsia	Hugo Ball	Non-fiction	Christian anarchism
1919	Proposed Roads to Freedom: Socialism, Anarchism, and Syndicalism	Bertrand Russell	Non-fiction	Multiple approaches
1920	Our Revolution: Essays in Interpretation	Victor S. Yarros	Non-fiction	Independent radicalism
1922	Ethics: Origin and Development	Peter Kropotkin	Non-fiction	Ethics, Egoism
1923	History of the Makhnovist Movement (1918–1921)	Peter Arshinov	Non-fiction	Makhnovshchina
1924	Anarchism Or Socialism?	Joseph Stalin	Non-fiction: Stalinist criticism of anarchism	Stalinism
1925	The Bolshevik Myth	Alexander Berkman	Non-fiction	Anarchism in Russia
1925	The End of Anarchism?	Luigi Galleani	Non-fiction	
1927	Programme of Anarcho-Syndicalism	Grigori Petrovitch Maximov	Non-fiction	Anarcho-syndicalism
1927	What is Mutualism?	Clarence Lee Swartz	Non-fiction	Mutualism
1929	Now and After: The ABC of Communist Anarchism	Alexander Berkman	Non-fiction	Anarcho-communism
1929	The Conquest of Violence: an Essay on War and Revolution	Bartholomeus de Ligt	Non-fiction	Anarcho-pacifism
1932	The Liberation of Society from the State: What is Communist Anarchism?	Erich Mühsam	Non-fiction	Anarcho-communism
1935	A Short History of Anarchism	Max Nettlau	Non-fiction: History	History of anarchism
1937	Nationalism and Culture	Rudolf Rocker	Non-fiction	Nationalism, Religion, Statism
1938	Anarcho-Syndicalism: Theory and Practice	Rudolf Rocker	Non-fiction	Anarcho-syndicalism
1938	The Kronstadt Commune	Ida Mett	Non-fiction: History	Kronstadt rebellion
1940	Why We Lost the War: A Contribution to the History of the Spanish Tragedy	Diego Abad de Santillán	Non-fiction: History	Anarchism in Spain
1949	Pioneers of American Freedom: Origin of Liberal and Radical Thought in America	Rudolf Rocker	Non-fiction	Anarchism in the United States, History of anarchism
1949	Nineteen Eighty-Four	George Orwell	Fiction: Dystopian	Political geography of Nineteen Eighty-Four, History of anarchism
1950	The Anarchist Prince	George Woodcock & Ivan Avakumović	Non-fiction: Biography	Peter Kropotkin
1954	Autobiography of a Catholic Anarchist	Ammon Hennacy	Non-fiction	Christian anarchism
1954	Lord of the Flies	William Golding	Fiction	Morality, Immorality
1956	Anarchist Individualism and Amorous Comradeship	Émile Armand	Non-fiction: Anthology	Free love, Individualist anarchism
1956	Pierre-Joseph Proudhon	George Woodcock	Non-fiction: Biography	Pierre-Joseph Proudhon
1959	Libertarian socialism: a practical outline	Gaston Leval	Non-fiction	Libertarian socialism
1961	The Chinese Anarchist Movement	Robert Scalapino & George T. Yu	Non-fiction	Anarchism in China
1962	Anarchism: A History of Libertarian Ideas and Movements	George Woodcock	Non-fiction: History	Mixed
1962	Compulsory Mis-Education and the Community of Scholars	Paul Goodman	Non-fiction	Anarchism, Dumbing down of education
1964	The Anarchists	James Joll	Non-fiction	History of anarchism
1965	Anarchism: From Theory to Practice	Daniel Guérin	Non-fiction	Anarchism
1966	The Moon Is a Harsh Mistress	Robert A. Heinlein	Fiction: Science fiction	Libertarianism
1967	The Russian Anarchists	Paul Avrich	Non-fiction: History	Anarchism in Russia
1970	Anarchism and Violence: Severino Di Giovanni in Argentina 1923–1931	Osvaldo Bayer	Non-fiction: History	Anarchism in Argentina, Severino Di Giovanni
1970	In Defense of Anarchism	Robert Paul Wolff	Non-fiction	Individualist anarchism
1970	Kronstadt, 1921	Paul Avrich	Non-fiction: History	The Kronstadt rebellion
1970	The Floodgates of Anarchy	Stuart Christie & Albert Meltzer	Non-fiction	Class struggle, Anarchism
1971	Post-Scarcity Anarchism	Murray Bookchin	Non-fiction	Communalism
1971	The Political Theory of Anarchism	April Carter	Non-fiction	Anarchism
1973	Anarchy in Action	Colin Ward	Non-fiction	Anarchism in the United Kingdom
1973	The Anarchists in the Russian Revolution	Paul Avrich	Non-fiction	Anarchism in Russia
1974	The Anarchist Collectives: Workers’ Self-management in the Spanish Revolution 1936–1939	Sam Dolgoff (Editor)	Non-fiction	Anarchism in Spain
1974	The Dispossessed	Ursula K. Le Guin	Fiction: Science fiction	Individualist anarchism, Collectivist anarchism
1975	The Monkey Wrench Gang	Edward Abbey	Fiction	Green anarchism
1976	Kropotkin	Martin A. Miller	Non-fiction	Peter Kropotkin
1976	Partisans of Freedom: A Study in American Anarchism	William O. Reichert	Non-fiction: History	Anarchism in the United States, History of anarchism
1976	The Anarchism of Nestor Makhno, 1918–1921	Michael Palij	Non-fiction	Nestor Makhno, Anarcho-communism
1976	The Spanish Anarchists: The Heroic Years, 1868–1936	Murray Bookchin	Non-fiction: History	Anarchism in Spain
1976	Housing: An Anarchist Approach	Colin Ward	Non-fiction: Architecture	Anarchist architecture
1978	An American Anarchist: The Life of Voltairine de Cleyre	Paul Avrich	Non-fiction: Biography	Anarchism in the United States
1978	The Eye of the Heron	Ursula K. Le Guin	Fiction: Science fiction	Anarcho-pacifism, Oligarchy
1980	The Modern School Movement: Anarchism and Education in the United States	Paul Avrich	Non-fiction	Anarchism in the United States
1980	New Libertarian Manifesto	Samuel Edward Konkin III	Non-fiction	Agorism
1982	People Without Government: An Anthropology of Anarchy	Harold Barclay	Non-fiction; History and anthropology	Anarchism
1983	Against His-Story, Against Leviathan!	Fredy Perlman	Non-fiction	Anarcho-primitivism
1984	The Haymarket Tragedy	Paul Avrich	Non-fiction: History	Haymarket massacre, Anarchism
1985	Ecodefense: A Field Guide to Monkeywrenching	David Foreman and Bill Haywood (Editors)	Non-fiction	Green anarchism, Direct action
1986	The Abolition of Work and Other Essays	Bob Black	Non-fiction	Individualist anarchism
1987	Christian Anarchy: Jesus' Primacy Over the Powers	Vernard Eller	Non-fiction	Christian anarchism
1988	Anarchist Portraits	Paul Avrich	Non-fiction	History of anarchism
1988	Elements of Refusal	John Zerzan	Non-fiction	Anarcho-primitivism
1988	The Adventures of Tintin: Breaking Free	'J. Daniels' (pseudonym)	Fiction: Parody	Anarchist parody of The Adventures of Tintin
1989	Anarchist Ideology and the Working-class Movement in Spain, 1868–1898	George Richard Esenwein	Non-fiction	Anarchism in Spain
1989	For Anarchism	David Goodway (Editor)	Non-fiction: Collection of essays	Mixed
1989	Kropotkin and the Rise of Revolutionary Anarchism	Caroline Cahm	Non-fiction	Peter Kropotkin, Anarcho-communism
1990	Anarchism in Latin America	Ángel Cappelletti	Non-fiction	History of anarchism
1991	Anarchy and Christianity	Jacques Ellul	Non-fiction	Christian anarchism
1991	Demanding the Impossible	Peter Marshall	Non-fiction: History	History of anarchism
1991	Sacco and Vanzetti: The Anarchist Background	Paul Avrich	Non-fiction	Anarchism
1991	Temporary Autonomous Zone	Peter Lamborn Wilson	Non-fiction	Individualist anarchism
1993	The Politics of Individualism: Liberalism, Liberal Feminism, and Anarchism	L. Susan Brown	Non-fiction: Political science	Individualist anarchism, Liberal feminism
1993	Anarchism and the Black Revolution	Lorenzo Kom'boa Ervin	Non-fiction	Black anarchism
1994	Cyphernomicon	Timothy C. May	Non-fiction	Crypto-anarchism
1994	Future Primitive and Other Essays	John Zerzan	Non-fiction	Anarcho-primitivism
1995	Star Fraction	Ken MacLeod	Fiction	Anarchism, Libertarian science fiction
1995	Anarchist Voices: An Oral History of Anarchism in America	Paul Avrich	Non-fiction	Anarchism in the United States
1995	Social Anarchism or Lifestyle Anarchism: An Unbridgeable Chasm	Murray Bookchin	Non-fiction	Social anarchism
1996	Stone Canal	Ken MacLeod	Fiction	Anarchism, Libertarian science fiction
1996	The Struggle Against the State and Other Essays	Nestor Makhno, Alexandre Skirda (Editor), Paul Sharkey (Translator)	Non-fiction: History and collection of essays	Anarcho-communism, Collectivist anarchism
1997	African Anarchism: The History of A Movement	Sam Mbah & I.E. Igariwey	Non-fiction	Anarchism in Africa
1998	Cassini Division	Ken MacLeod	Fiction	Anarchism, Anarchist communism
1999	Christi-Anarchy: Discovering a Radical Spirituality of Compassion	David Andrews	Non-fiction	Christian anarchism
1999	Sky Road	Ken MacLeod	Fiction	Anarchism, Green anarchism
2000	What is Green Anarchy?	Green Anarchy (Anonymous editor)	Non-fiction	Green anarchism, Anarcho-primitivism
2001	Direct Action: Memoirs of an Urban Guerrilla	Ann Hansen	Non-fiction	Squamish Five, Urban guerrilla warfare
2001	Introduction to Civil War	Tiqqun	Non-fiction	Insurrection, Civil war
2001	Theses on the Terrible Community	Tiqqun	Non-fiction	Nihilism, Insurrection
2003	The Watch	Dennis Danvers	Fiction	Anarchism
2005	Anarchism: A Documentary History of Libertarian Ideas	Robert Graham (Editor)	Non-fiction: Anthology	Mixed
2005	Chomsky on Anarchism	Barry Pateman	Non-fiction	Noam Chomsky, Anarcho-syndicalism
2005	Gramsci Is Dead: Anarchist Currents in the Newest Social Movements	Richard J. F. Day	Non-fiction	Post-anarchism
2005	Rebel Alliances: The Means and Ends of Contemporary British Anarchisms	Benjamin Franks	Non-fiction	Anarchism in the United Kingdom, Autonomist Marxism
2005	Anarchism: A Beginner's Guide	Ruth Kinna	Non-fiction	Anarchism
2006	Anarchist Seeds Beneath the Snow	David Goodway	Non-fiction	Anarchism in the United Kingdom
2006	Endgame	Derrick Jensen	Non-fiction	Green anarchism
2006	History of anarchism	Jean Préposiet	Non-fiction	History of anarchism
2007	Anarchy Alive!: Anti-Authoritarian Politics from Practice to Theory	Uri Gordon	Non-fiction	Anarchism
2007	Beer and Revolution: The German Anarchist Movement in New York City, 1880–1914	Tom Goyens	Non-fiction: History	Anarchism in the United States
2007	How Nonviolence Protects the State	Peter Gelderloos	Non-fiction	Antipacifism, Anarchism
2007	The Coming Insurrection	The Invisible Committee	Non-fiction	Insurrectionary anarchism
2008	Against the State: An Introduction to Anarchist Political Theory	Crispin Sartwell	Non-fiction	Anti-statism
2008	An Agorist Primer	Samuel Edward Konkin III (Note: An Agorist Primer was published posthumously.)	Non-fiction	Agorism
2008	Social Anarchism and Organisation	Anarchist Federation of Rio de Janeiro	Non-fiction	Social anarchism, Anarchism in Brazil
2009	A Living Revolution: Anarchism in the Kibbutz Movement	James Horrox	Non-fiction	Jewish anarchism
2009	Anarcho-syndicalism in the 20th Century	Vadim Damier	Non-fiction	Anarcho-syndicalism
2009	Black Flame: The Revolutionary Class Politics of Anarchism and Syndicalism (Counter-Power vol. 1)	Lucien van der Walt & Michael Schmidt	Non-fiction: History and anthropology	Anarcho-communism, Anarcho-syndicalism
2009	Direct Action: An Ethnography	David Graeber	Non-fiction: History and anthropology	Anarchism, Global justice movement
2009	The Art of Not Being Governed: An Anarchist History of Upland Southeast Asia	James C. Scott	Non-fiction: History and anthropology	Stateless society
2009	A Paradise Built in Hell: The Extraordinary Communities That Arise in Disaster	Rebecca Solnit	Non-fiction: History and anthropology	Mutual aid
2010	Anarchy Works	Peter Gelderloos	Non-fiction	Violent anarchism, Individualist anarchism
2010	New Perspectives on Anarchism, Labour and Syndicalism: The Individual, the National and the Transnational	David Berry & Constance Bantman	Non-fiction	Anarcho-syndicalism, History of anarchism
2010	The World That Never Was: A True Story of Dreamers, Schemers, Anarchists, and Secret Agents	Alex Butterworth	Non-fiction: History	History of anarchism
2011	Anarchism: A Marxist Criticism	John Molyneux	Non-fiction: Marxist criticism of anarchism	Anarchism, Marxism
2012	Marx’s Economics for Anarchists	Wayne Price	Non-fiction	Marxian economics, Anarchism
2012	Sasha and Emma: The Anarchist Odyssey of Alexander Berkman and Emma Goldman	Paul Avrich	Non-fiction: History	Jewish anarchism
2012	That Holy Anarchist: Reflections on Christianity & Anarchism	Mark Van Steenwyk	Non-fiction	Christian anarchism
2012	The Accumulation of Freedom: Writings on Anarchist Economics	Deric Shannon, Anthony J. Nocella, II, & John Asimakopoulos (Editors)	Non-fiction	Anarchist economics
2012	Two Cheers for Anarchism: Six Easy Pieces on Autonomy, Dignity, and Meaningful Work and Play	James C. Scott	Non-fiction	Anarchism, Stateless society
2012	Queering Anarchism: Addressing and Undressing Power and Desire	Deric Shannon, C. B. Daring, J. Rogue, Abbey Volcano (Editors)	Non-fiction: anthology	Queer anarchism
2013	The Democracy Project	David Graeber	Non-fiction: History and anthropology	Occupy Wall Street
2013	The Problem of Political Authority: An Examination of the Right to Coerce and the Duty to Obey	Michael Huemer	Non-fiction	Philosophical anarchism, Anarcho-capitalism
2014	Anarchism is Movement: Anarchism, Neoanarchism and Postanarchism	Tomás Ibáñez	Non-fiction	Contemporary anarchism, Post-anarchism
2014	The Anthropology of Utopia: Essays on Social Ecology and Community Development	Dan Chodorkoff	Non-fiction: History and anthropology	Green anarchism, History of anarchism
2014	To Our Friends	The Invisible Committee	Non-fiction	Insurrectionary anarchism
2015	Ecology or Catastrophe: The Life of Murray Bookchin	Janet Biehl	Non-fiction: Biography	Green anarchism, Communalism
2015	Living Anarchism: José Peirats and the Spanish Anarcho-Syndicalist Movement	Chris Ealham	Non-fiction: Biography	Anarchism in Spain, Anarcho-syndicalism
2015	Immigrants Against the State: Yiddish and Italian Anarchism in America	Kenyon Zimmer	Non-fiction	Anarchism in the United States
2017	Radical Gotham: Anarchism in New York City from Schwab's Saloon to Occupy Wall Street	Tom Goyens	Non-fiction: History	Anarchism in the United States
2017	Walkaway	Cory Doctorow	Fiction	Anarchism, Post-capitalism
2019	From Crisis to Communisation	Gilles Dauvé	Non-fiction	Communization
2019	The Palgrave Handbook of Anarchism	Carl Levy, Matthew S. Adams	Non-fiction: Academic work	Anarchism
2019	The Government of No One: The Theory and Practice of Anarchism	Ruth Kinna	Non-fiction	Anarchism
2021	The Anarchist Handbook	Michael Malice	Non-fiction	Anarchism, Stateless society
2021	Anarcho-transcreation	Mirna Wabi-Sabi	Non-fiction	Anarchism, Anarchism in Brazil, Anarchism in Indonesia
2021	An Anarchist's Manifesto	Glenn Wallis	Non-fiction	Anarchism for liberals
2022	After the Revolution	Robert Evans	Fiction	Anarchism, Post-Apocalism
2022	No Pasarán!: Antifascist Dispatches from a World in Crisis	Shane Burley (Editor), David Renton (Afterword), Tal Lavin (Foreword), Institute for Anarchist Studies	Non-fiction	Anarchism, Anti-fascism
2023	Means and Ends: The Revolutionary Practice of Anarchism in Europe and the United States	Zoe Baker	Non-fiction	History of anarchism, Anarchism in the United States
2025	How to Build Municipalist Communes: Prefigurative Politics, Economy, Social Ecology, Education & Self-Governance	Mason Carter	Non-fiction	History of anarchism, Anarchism in the United States
2025	Dictionary of Anarchist Thought: The First-Ever Comprehensive Lexicon of Anarchism	Mason Carter	Non-fiction	Dictionary of Anarchist Thought, Anarchism in the United States

== See also ==
- Anarchist schools of thought
- History of anarchism
- Labadie Collection
