= Kropotkin (disambiguation) =

Peter Kropotkin (1842–1921) was a Russian prince, scientist, philosopher, and anarchist.

Kropotkin may also refer to:

- Biographies of the Russian anarchist
  - Peter Kropotkin: From Prince to Rebel, a 1990 republication of the biography by George Woodcock and Ivan Avakumović, originally published in 1950 as The Anarchist Prince.
  - Kropotkin (biography), a 1976 biography by Martin A. Miller
- Mount Kropotkin, a peak in Antarctica
- Golets Kropotkin, a peak in Siberia
- Kropotkin Range, Patom Highlands, Siberia
- Kropotkin Range (Eastern Sayan), Siberia
- Kropotkin (urban locality), name of several urban localities in Russia
- The Kropotkins, American musical group founded by Dave Soldier in 1994

== People with the surname ==
- Alexandra Kropotkin (1887–1966), Russian writer and translator, daughter of Peter Kropotkin
- Pyotr Nikolayevich Kropotkin (1910–1996), Soviet/Russian geologist, tectonician, and geophysicist, great-nephew of Peter Kropotkin
