= Lacan (disambiguation) =

Lacan (French pronunciation: [lakɑ̃]) is the surname of:

- Jacques(-Marie-Émile) Lacan (1901–1981), French psychoanalyst and psychiatrist
  - The Seminars of Jacques Lacan
  - From Bakunin to Lacan: Anti-Authoritarianism and the Dislocation of Power, a book on political philosophy by Saul Newman
  - Lacan at the Scene
- Judith Miller (philosopher), (née Lacan, 1941–2017)
- Leïla Lacan (born 2004), French basketball player
