= Keyser Söze =

Character in the 1995 film The Usual Suspects

- The Usual Suspects' Roger "Verbal" Kint, possibly Keyser Söze, in a police lineup
- First appearance: The Usual Suspects
- Created by: Christopher McQuarrie
- Portrayed by: Kevin Spacey; Scott B. Morgan (flashback); Gabriel Byrne (flashback)

In-universe information
- Alias: Roger "Verbal" Kint
- Gender: Male
- Occupation: Crime lord, con artist
- Nationality: Unknown

Keyser Söze (/ˈkaɪzər ˈsoʊzeɪ/ KY-zər SOH-zay) is a fictional character and the main antagonist in the 1995 film The Usual Suspects, written by Christopher McQuarrie and directed by Bryan Singer. According to the main protagonist, petty con artist Roger "Verbal" Kint (Kevin Spacey), Söze is a crime lord whose ruthlessness and influence have acquired a mythical status among police and criminals alike. Further events in the story make these accounts unreliable; in a plot twist, a police sketch identifies Kint and Söze as one and the same. The character was inspired by real-life murderer John List, and by the spy thriller No Way Out, which features a shadowy KGB mole who may or may not actually exist.

The character has placed on numerous "best villain" lists over the years, including AFI's 100 Years...100 Heroes & Villains. Spacey won the Academy Award for Best Supporting Actor, turning him from a character actor into a star. Since the release of the film, the character has become synonymous with infamous criminals. Analysis of the character has focused on the ambiguity of his true identity and whether he even exists inside the story's reality. Though the filmmakers have preferred to leave the character's nature to viewer interpretation, Singer has said he believes Kint and Söze are the same person.

== Concept and creation ==
Director Bryan Singer and writer Christopher McQuarrie originally conceived of The Usual Suspects as five felons meeting in a police line-up. Eventually, a powerful underworld figure responsible for their meeting was added to the plot. McQuarrie combined this plot with another idea of his based on the true story of John List, who murdered his family and started a new life. The name was based on one of McQuarrie's supervisors during his time as a copywriter at the firm Richards, Watson, and Gershon, though the last name was changed as the namesake did not want to be associated with a villain. McQuarrie settled on Söze after finding it in a Turkish-language dictionary; it comes from the idiom söze boğmak, which means "to talk unnecessarily too much and cause confusion" (literally: to drown in words).

Keyser Söze's semi-mythical nature was inspired by Yuri, a rumored KGB mole whose existence nobody can confirm, from the spy thriller No Way Out. Kint was not originally written to be as obviously intelligent; in the script, he was, according to McQuarrie, "presented as a dummy". Spacey and Singer had previously met at a screening for Singer's film Public Access. Spacey requested a role in Singer's next film, and McQuarrie wrote the role of Kint specifically for him. McQuarrie said he wanted audiences to dismiss Kint as a minor character, as Spacey was not yet well-known. Spacey made it more obvious that the character is holding back information, though the depth of his involvement and nature of his secrets remain unrevealed. McQuarrie said that he approved of the changes, as it makes the character "more fascinating".

== Fictional history ==
The Usual Suspects consists mostly of flashbacks narrated by Roger "Verbal" Kint (Kevin Spacey), a con artist with cerebral palsy. Kint was arrested after an apparent drug-related robbery gone wrong which resulted in the destruction of a freighter ship and the deaths of nearly everyone on board. He has been granted immunity from prosecution provided he assists investigators, including Customs Agent David Kujan (Chazz Palminteri), and reveals all details of his involvement with a group of career criminals who are assumed to be responsible for the bloodbath. While Kint is telling his story, Kujan learns the name Keyser Söze from FBI agent Jack Baer (Giancarlo Esposito) and orders Kint to tell him what he knows.

Kint states that Söze was believed to be of Turkish origin, but some have said that he was half German through his father.

According to Kint, Söze began his criminal career as a small-time drug dealer. Horrifically though, one afternoon while Söze is away from home, rival Hungarian gangsters attempt to intimidate him by taking his family hostage and raping his wife, then, when he returns home, slitting the throat of one of his children right before his eyes. Determined to show these "men of will" what will really was, Söze shoots and kills his own family and all but one of the Hungarians, letting the last leave so he can tell his cohorts what happened. Once his family is buried, Söze massacres the Hungarian Mafia, their families, their friends, and even people who owe them money. He goes underground, never again doing business in person, operating instead through oblivious underlings.

Söze's ruthlessness is legendary; Kint describes him as having had enemies and henchmen brutally murdered, along with everyone they hold dear, for the slightest infractions. Over the years, his criminal empire flourishes, as does his legend. Remarking on Söze's mythical nature, Kint says, "The greatest trick the Devil ever pulled was convincing the world he didn't exist", a line borrowed from Charles Baudelaire. (Note: Baudelaire, "Le Joueur Généreux," where the Devil recounts to a gambler that he has even heard a preacher (plus subtil que ses confrères) cry: "Mes chers frères, n'oubliez jamais, quand vous entendrez vanter le progrès des lumières, que la plus belle des ruses du diable est de vous persuader qu'il n'existe pas!" French text on Wikisource Neither McQuarrie nor Singer realized this at the time and included it after hearing others paraphrase the quotation.)

In Kint's story, he and several other criminals meet after being jailed on a trumped-up hijacking charge and work together as thieves for hire. After a botched robbery, they are blackmailed by Söze, through Söze's lawyer Kobayashi (Pete Postlethwaite), into destroying a rival Argentinean gang's $91-million drug shipment. All but Kint and a Hungarian, Arkash Kovash (Morgan Hunter), are killed in the attack. However, as no drugs were ever found at the scene, Baer and Kujan believe the true purpose of the attack was to eliminate an informant on the ship named Arturo Marquez, a fugitive whom the Argentineans were attempting to sell to Hungarian mobsters. Marquez, had he survived, was one of the exceedingly rare people who could have positively identified Söze, having actually seen his face.

Kujan confronts Kint with the theory that Söze is corrupt ex-police officer Dean Keaton (Gabriel Byrne), one of the criminals involved. Kujan's investigation of Keaton, which had been ongoing for three years, is what had involved him in the case in the first place.

In the film's final scene, it is revealed that Kint's story is a fabrication, comprising strung-together details culled from a crowded bulletin board in a messy office. Kovash describes Söze to a sketch artist: the drawing faxed in to the police resembles Kint. Kujan pursues Kint, who has already been released, his limp gone. Kujan misses Kint by moments as the latter gets into a car driven by "Kobayashi".

== Reception and legacy ==
A. O. Scott of The New York Times called Keyser Söze the "perfect postmodern sociopath", and Quentin Curtis of The Independent described him as "the most compelling creation in recent American film". Jason Bailey of The Atlantic identified the role as turning Kevin Spacey from a character actor to a star. Kevin Spacey received the Academy Award for Best Supporting Actor for his performance.

The character placed 48th in the American Film Institute's "AFI's 100 Years...100 Heroes & Villains" in June 2003. Time placed him at #10 on their list of most memorably named film characters and #5 in best pop culture gangsters. Entertainment Weekly ranked the character #37 in their list of the 100 greatest characters of the past 20 years, #6 in "most vile villains", and #12 in the best heroes and villains. Ask Men ranked him #6 in their list of top ten film villains. Total Film ranked him #37 in their best villains and #40 in best characters overall. MSN ranked him #4 in their list of the 13 most menacing villains. Empire ranked him #41 in their "100 Greatest Movie Characters" poll.

=== Analysis ===
In an interview with Metro Silicon Valley, Pete Postlethwaite quoted Bryan Singer as saying that all the characters are Söze. When asked point blank whether his character is Söze, Postlethwaite said, "Who knows? Nobody knows. That's what's good about The Usual Suspects." Spacey has also been evasive about his character's true identity. In an interview with Total Film, he said, "That's for the audience to decide. My job is to show up and do a part – I don't own the audience's imagination." Singer said the film is ambiguous about most of the character's details, but the fax sent at the end of the film proves in his mind that Kint is Söze.

Bryan Enk, writing for UGO, states that the myth-making story of Söze's origins is a classic ghost story that would be right at home in horror fiction. Writing about psychopaths in film, academic Wayne Wilson explicitly likens Söze to Satan and assigns to him demonic motives. Wilson alleges that Söze allows himself to be caught just to prove his superiority over the police; this compromises his ultimate goal of anonymity, but Söze cannot resist the urge to show off and create mischief. In The Journal of Nietzsche Studies, Lewis Call theorizes that Söze's mythological status draws the ire of the authoritarian government agents because he "represents a terrifying truth: that power is ephemeral, and has no basis in reality." According to Call, Söze's intermediaries – the "usual suspects" themselves – are more useful to the police, as they represent an easily controlled and intimidated criminal underworld, in direct contrast to Söze himself.

Hanna M. Roisman likens Kint to Odysseus, capable of adapting both his personality and his tales to his current audience. Throughout his tale, Kint adapts his confession to Kujan's revealed biases. Roisman draws direct parallels to Odysseus' tales to the Phaeacians: like Odysseus, Kint allows his audience to define him and his narrative. Appealing to Kujan's arrogance, Kint allows himself to be outwitted, humiliated, and broken by his interrogator; Kint further invents a mythical villain that he credulously believes in and gives Kujan the privileged perspective of the skeptic. Kint thus creates a neo-noir thriller inside of a neo-noir thriller and demonstrates the artificiality of storytelling. Benjamin Widiss identifies post-structural elements to the film, such as the lack of a clear protagonist throughout much of the film. This extends to ambiguity over Kint's role as author or reader, and whether he is Kint pretending to be Söze or the reverse.

Söze was also subject to detailed fan analysis and debate. Fans contacted Singer personally and quizzed him on explanations for the film's complicated plot. Fan theories about Söze's identity became a popular topic on Internet forums. After the film's festival premiere, the ambiguity of Söze's identity and how to pronounce his name were used in the film's marketing. Pronunciation had previously been an issue for distributor Gramercy Pictures, who used, "Who is Keyser Söze?" to demonstrate both proper pronunciation and stoke speculation. The ad campaign was later highlighted by Entertainment Weekly as "question of the year" for 1995.

== In popular culture ==
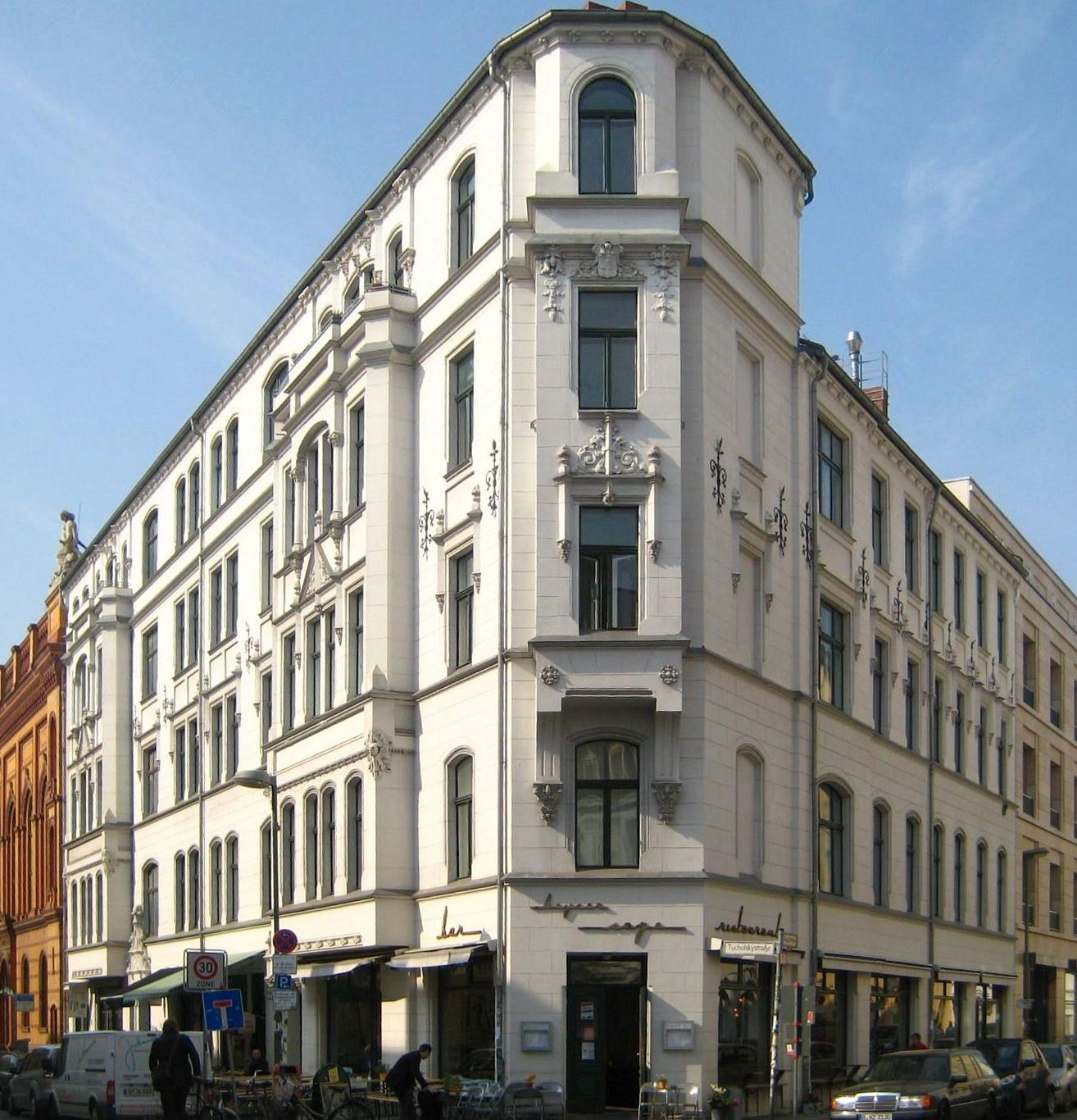
Bar "Keyser Soze" in Berlin-Mitte

Since the release of the film, the name "Keyser Söze" has become synonymous with a feared, elusive person nobody has met. In June 2001, Time referred to Osama bin Laden as "a geopolitical Keyser Söze, an omnipresent menace whose very name invokes perils far beyond his capability".

In his 1999 review of Fight Club, which was generally negative, film critic Roger Ebert commented, "A lot of recent films seem unsatisfied unless they can add final scenes that redefine the reality of everything that has gone before; call it the Keyser Söze syndrome." Ebert was negative about The Usual Suspects itself, stating "to the degree I do understand [the movie], I don't care".

=== Television ===
During episode six of the first season of Billions, the character "Dollar" Bill Stearn invokes Keyser Söze's name when metaphorically "murdering" his own family.

In the third season of the American comedy fantasy television series The Good Place, main character Eleanor Shellstrop talks about her mother, saying "When the time comes, she will rip this guy off and disappear like Keyser Söze—right after he admitted to groping all those people," making a veiled reference to the sexual misconduct allegations against Kevin Spacey.

In the second season of the Irish comedy Derry Girls, which is set in the 1990s, several characters go to see The Usual Suspects. The theater gets evacuated before the film ends, and Ma Mary obsesses about finding out who Keyser Söze is.

In the episode "The Puppet Show" of the television series Buffy the Vampire Slayer, a character asks, "Does anyone else feel like they've been Keyser Söze'd?", referring to a sense of having been definitively manipulated and outmaneuvered.

=== Music ===
In 1996, punk band Link 80 used the character as the basis of the opening song (titled "Verbal Kint") on their debut album 17 Reasons.
