= Uri Gordon =

Uri Gordon may refer to:

- Uri Gordon (anarchist) (born 1976), Israeli anarchist
- Uri Gordon (Zionist) (1935–2000), Israeli Zionist
