= From Bakunin to Lacan =

Book by Saul Newman

From Bakunin to Lacan: Anti-Authoritarianism and the Dislocation of Power
- First edition cover art.
- Author: Saul Newman
- Language: English
- Subject: Anarchism, post-anarchism, postmodernism
- Publisher: Lexington Books
- Publication date: April 28, 2001
- Publication place: United States
- Media type: Print (hardcover)
- Pages: 208 pp. (first edition)
- ISBN: 0-7391-0240-0
- OCLC: 45493176
- Dewey Decimal: 320/.01 21
- LC Class: JC330 .N49 2001

From Bakunin to Lacan: Anti-Authoritarianism and the Dislocation of Power is a book on political philosophy by Saul Newman, published in 2001. It investigates the essential characteristics of anarchist theory, which holds that government and hierarchy are undesirable forms of social organisation. Newman seeks to move beyond the limitations these characteristics imposed on classical anarchism by using concepts from post-structuralist thought.

By applying post-structuralist theory to anarchism, Newman presents an account of post-anarchism. His post-anarchism is more substantive than that of earlier thinkers, and has influenced later approaches to the philosophy. Released in a climate of an anarchist movement hostile to postmodern philosophy, From Bakunin to Lacan was criticised for its poor understanding of and engagement with contemporary anarchism.

== Background ==
The book was released in the context of the dispute in the newly resurgent anarchist movement between critics of civilisation (primarily anarcho-primitivists exemplified by John Zerzan) and its supporters (notably Murray Bookchin). Although sharply disagreeing on the merits of civilisation, technology and language, both Zerzan and Bookchin derided postmodernism as disempowering the individual and reinforcing the existing order. Another significant factor in the intellectual climate of the book's release was the rediscovery in the 1990s of anarchist theory within academia.

== Content ==
Philosophy professor and post-structural anarchist Todd May asserts that the overall purpose of the book is "to offer a critique of the way power, and specifically political power, is commonly conceived". Newman persistently questions how anarchism can refrain from reproducing the forms of oppression that it strives to overcome.

Newman incorporates concepts from post-structuralist thought such as post-humanism and anti-essentialism into classical anarchism. Unlike May, whose post-anarchism is a combination of the two, Newman attempts to move beyond both anarchism and post-structuralism. He proposes that "by using the poststructuralist critique one can theorize the possibility of political resistance without essentialist guarantees: a politics of postanarchism … by incorporating the moral principles of anarchism with the postructuralist critique of essentialism, it may be possible to arrive at an ethically workable, politically valid, and genuinely democratic notion of resistance to domination".

Newman focuses particularly on the work of Gilles Deleuze, Jacques Derrida, and psychoanalyst Jacques Lacan.

== Reception ==
Aimed at an academic rather than anarchist audience, the book was criticised in Anarchy: A Journal of Desire Armed for its unsophisticated, cursory understanding of and engagement with anarchist theory. While praising that section of the book on post-structuralist philosophers, reviewer sasha k claimed that "Newman uses Kropotkin and Bakunin as his stand-ins for anarchism in general, and, in turn, only a few quotes from each to make his case". He questioned whether Newman's attribution of an essentialist conception of human nature to modern anarchists was accurate, concluding that, had the book taken "a less one-dimensional view of anarchism", it would have to give up "most of what makes postanarchism post-anarchism.

New Formulation reviewer Michael Glavin cited Newman's ignorance of the initiative of anarchists to decentralize power and of anarchist forms of organisation such as trade unions, federations and affinity groups as evidence that he failed to understand power and wrongly conflated it with domination.

== See also ==
- Counter-Enlightenment
- Lewis Call
- Post-left anarchy
- Post-Marxism
