= Social Anarchism or Lifestyle Anarchism =

- First edition cover
- Author: Murray Bookchin
- Language: English
- Publisher: AK Press
- Publication date: 1995
- Media type: Print (paperback)
- Pages: 86
- ISBN: 978-1-873-17683-2

Social Anarchism or Lifestyle Anarchism is a 1995 book by American social theorist Murray Bookchin.

In the essay that gives the book its title, Bookchin argues that anarchism has become increasingly divided between a revolutionary social anarchism and what he calls lifestyle anarchism, which he associates with personalism and nihilism.

== Summary ==
"Social Anarchism or Lifestyle Anarchism: An Unbridgeable Chasm" defends that contemporary anarchism has split into two fundamentally incompatible tendencies: a collectivist tradition rooted in class struggle, democracy, and revolution, and a newer "lifestyle anarchism" centered on personal autonomy, self-expression, and spirituality. Bookchin sharply criticizes writers – among them Max Stirner, Friedrich Nietzsche, Hakim Bey, L. Susan Brown, David Watson, John Zerzan, and Michel Foucault – and currents associated with postmodernism, anti-civilization thought, and individualist anarchism, claiming they replace organized political action with cultural gestures. The essay ultimately defends democratic communalism as the authentic continuation of the anarchist tradition.

In the book's second essay, "The Left That Was: A Personal Reflection," Bookchin argues that the historical left sought a common humanity that transcended ethnic, national, and cultural divisions, whereas contemporary movements often fragment society into competing identities. He calls for a revival of a democratic, internationalist, and revolutionary left.

== Reception ==
The book is among Bookchin's most influential and controversial works. Its "unbridgeable chasm" thesis has been criticized by other anarchists. Bob Black's response to Bookchin, Anarchy after Leftism (1997), became a seminal work of post-left anarchism.
