= Avakumović =

Avakumović, sometimes spelled Avakumovich, is a surname. Notable people with the surname include:

- Jovan Avakumović (died 1810), Serbian poet, nobleman and lawyer
- Jovan Avakumović (1841–1928), Prime Minister of Serbia
- Ivan Avakumović (1926–2013), Serbian Canadian historian
