= Anarchism: A Documentary History of Libertarian Ideas =

Three-volume anthology of anarchist writings edited by Robert Graham

Anarchism: A Documentary History of Libertarian Ideas is a three-volume anthology of anarchist writings edited by historian Robert Graham. The anthology is published by Black Rose Books. Each selection is introduced by Graham, placing each author and selection in their historical and ideological context. The focus of the anthology is on the origins and development of anarchist ideas; it is not a documentary history of the world's anarchist movements, although the selections are geographically diverse.

== Volume One ==
Volume One: From Anarchy to Anarchism (300 CE to 1939) was published in Montreal by Black Rose Books in 2005. Anarchist writer and publisher Stuart Christie wrote of the first volume in the Independent on Sunday that it "provides a good, comprehensive introduction to the strands, ideas and themes of anarchist and libertarian thought from the feudal era (AD300) to 1939". George Fetherling of The Georgia Straight compared the collection favourably to Daniel Guérin's No Gods No Masters: An Anthology of Anarchism, observing that in contrast to Guérin's focus on the established canon of 19th-century European anarchist thinkers and adversarial style, Graham's collection "goes much farther afield, not only in scope and time but also in geography", and takes an informative, non-confrontational tone. The Kate Sharpley Library praised the collection for avoiding both repetitive drabness and the temptation to opt for selections of misrepresentative novelty, and singled out the Latin American and Asian selections as "especially valuable because so little is easily available elsewhere". The volume was also recommended by Kenneth Gregg in a literature review for the anarcho-capitalist website LewRockwell.com, and by mutualist scholar Shawn P. Wilbur.

In a review of the collection for the Fall 2006 issue of Labour/Le Travail, leading post-anarchism theorist Saul Newman declared it to be "symptomatic of a growing interest in anarchism and a revitalization of the anarchist tradition", and that it would "serve as an excellent introduction to the anti-authoritarian tradition, and an important resource for the scholar of anarchism". While identifying the collection's assembly of such a diverse range of material as its strength, Newman found its "eclecticism and sheer panoramic scope" also to be a weakness, in that the brevity of the selections often left the reader with only a superficial understanding of the author's work. Being an anthology encompassing a wide range of topics and numerous authors, readers are encouraged to consult the original sources if they wish to learn more about a particular topic or author.

== Subsequent volumes ==
Volume 2, subtitled "The Emergence of the New Anarchism", covers the period from 1939, with the defeat of the Spanish Revolution and the start of the Second World War, to 1977, by which time there had been a significant resurgence in anarchist ideas and movements. It includes material from Herbert Read, Emma Goldman, Daniel Guérin, Marie Louise Berneri, Paul Goodman, Martin Buber, André Breton, Peggy Kornegger, Noam Chomsky, Murray Bookchin, Colin Ward, Ivan Illich, Pierre Clastres, Paul Feyerabend, Carol Ehrlich and many others. Its publication was announced by Graham on April 12, 2009. AK Press Revolution by the Book describes Volume 2 as an exciting read, "because you discover new writers and/or writers you've only seen referenced or briefly quoted before (all contextualized by Robert's introductions)."

Volume 3, subtitled "The New Anarchism" covers the period from 1974 to 2012, showcasing the different currents in anarchist theory and practice which have developed since the 1970s. It was published in November 2012 . Contributors include Peter Marshall, Murray Bookchin, Carole Pateman, Noam Chomsky, Todd May, David Graeber, Jeff Ferrell, Richard Sonn, Mark Leier, Saul Newman, Richard Day and many others. Chapters cover a variety of topics, including anarchism and self-managing democracy, global justice movements, especifismo, anarchist politics, revolutionary movements across the globe, direct action, the logic of state power, anarchy and ecology, personal, social and sexual liberation, art and anarchy, anti-capitalism, post-anarchism and the relevance of anarchism today.

Andrew Cornell has described the anthology as "both a map of a movement and a treasure trove of ideas – a valuable textbook for political militants and scholars alike." Iain McKay calls it "essential reading for all those interested in libertarian thought. The breadth of authors and subjects is both comprehensive and impressive, giving a much needed overview of anarchism as an evolving and relevant social movement and theory." Alan Antliff says that the three volume series "is an invaluable resource, with texts encompassing a remarkable range of theorists, organizations, and thematic issues."

== See also ==
- List of books about anarchism
