= 1966 Governor General's Awards =

Canadian literary award

Each winner of the 1966 Governor General's Awards for Literary Merit was selected by a panel of judges administered by the Canada Council for the Arts.

== Winners ==
=== English Language ===
- Fiction: Margaret Laurence, A Jest of God
- Poetry or Drama: Margaret Atwood, The Circle Game
- Non-Fiction: George Woodcock, The Crystal Spirit: A Study of George Orwell

=== French Language ===
- Fiction: Claire Martin, La joue droite
- Poetry or Drama: Réjean Ducharme, L'avalée des avalés
- Non-Fiction: Marcel Trudel, Le comptoir, 1604–1627
