= Anarchy Alive! =

2007 book by Uri Gordon

- First edition cover
- Author: Uri Gordon
- Subject: Anarchism
- Genre: Political philosophy, sociology
- Publisher: Pluto Press
- Publication date: November 2007
- Publication place: United Kingdom
- Pages: 183
- ISBN: 0-7453-2683-8
- OCLC: 154769337
- Dewey Decimal: 320.5/7 22
- LC Class: HX833 .G626 2008

Anarchy Alive!: Anti-Authoritarian Politics from Practice to Theory is a book by Uri Gordon that investigates anarchist theory and practice. An expanded reworking of the author's PhD thesis at the University of Oxford, the book was released by Pluto Press, a London-based radical publisher, in November 2007. It is presented as "an anarchist book about anarchism", and assumes some background knowledge and sympathy for anarchism on the part of the reader. Gordon considers his approach in the book to have many commonalities with that of anthropologist David Graeber, author of Fragments of an Anarchist Anthropology.

== Contents ==
Anarchy Alive! was not designed to further debates about the finer points of anarchist theory within academia, nor as a history of ideas, but rather to serve as a tool for activists trying to engage with theory—leading anarchist scholar Alex Prichard to characterise it as "a user’s manual for anarchist activism". It is divided into six chapters, addressing anarchism as a political culture, anarchism as an ideology, anarchist forms of organisation and power, anarchism and violence, anarchism and technology, and anarchism and nationalism (through the case study of the Israeli–Palestinian conflict).

== Reception ==
Anarchy Alive! was favourably reviewed in journals including Anarchy: A Journal of Desire Armed, New International and Anarchist Studies. Reviewing the book in Anarchist Studies, Alex Prichard predicted that "not only will Anarchy Alive! become required reading in the anarchist movement, but it will have a sizeable impact on the academy … this will be a defining text in anarchist circles for the next few years at the very least". Richard Swift, in a review for New International, called the book "a short and thoughtful account", and granted it a four-out-out-of-four star rating. The CrimethInc. collective recommended the work for its analysis of power and authority in an anarchist context. Freedom reviewer Tom Jennings dissented, calling into question the theoretical coherence of the book. Another critical view came from the Socialist Standard, which although conceding that the book was "well-written and can be read on a know-your-opponent basis", denounced the book for its anarchist critique of representative democracy.

== See also ==
- List of anarchist books
- Issues in anarchism
- Prefigurative politics
