= Voluntary Socialism =

Book by Francis Dashwood Tandy in 1896

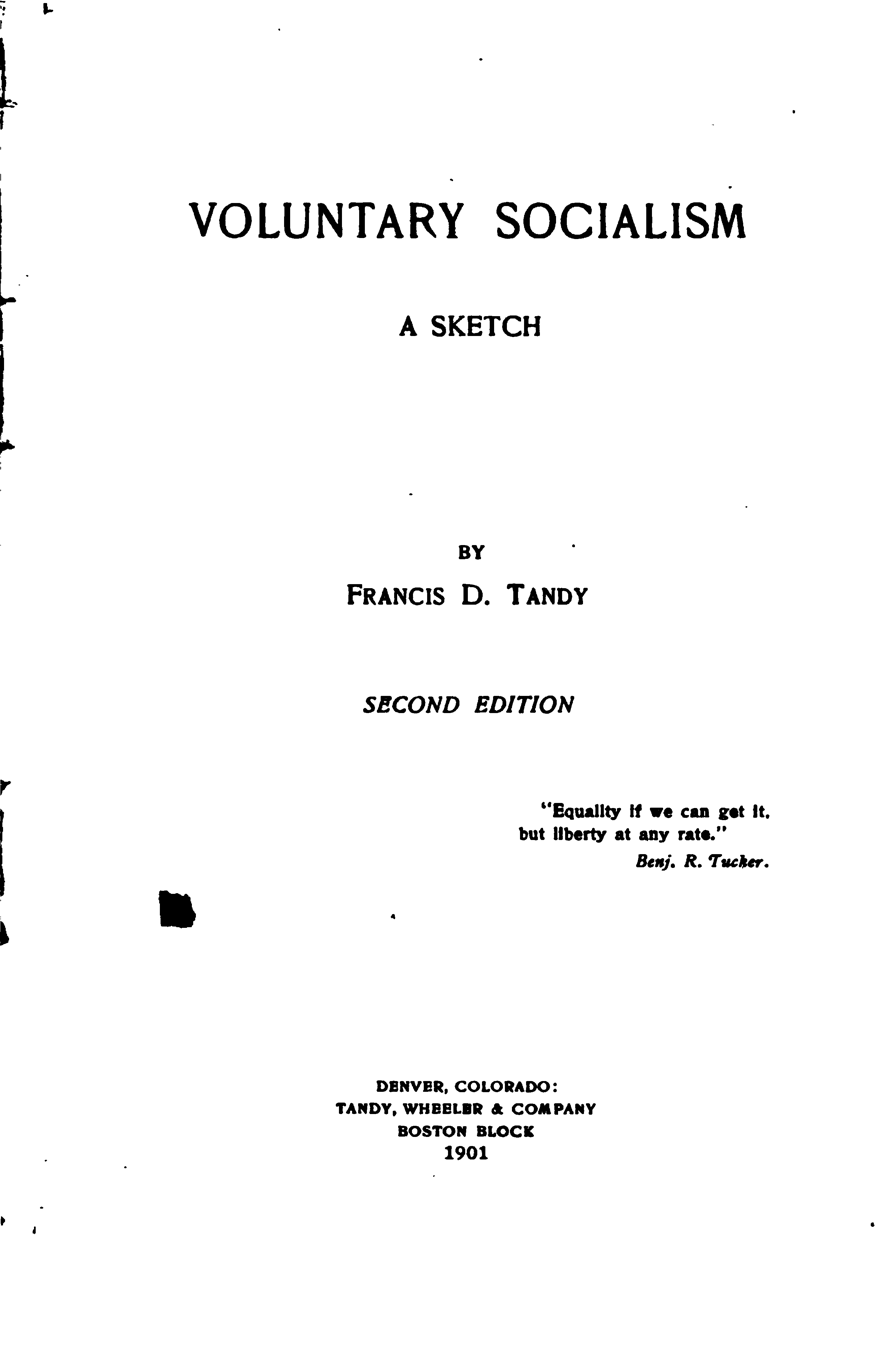
- The cover of the 1901 reprint
- Author: Francis Tandy
- Language: English
- Subject: Political philosophy
- Genre: Non-fiction
- Publisher: Basic Books
- Publication date: 1896
- Publication place: United States
- Media type: Print
- Pages: 228

Voluntary Socialism is a work of nonfiction by the American mutualist Francis Dashwood Tandy (1867–1913). First published in 1896, it was favorably cited by many individualist anarchists, including Clarence Lee Swartz, minarchist Robert Nozick and left-libertarian Roderick T. Long, who said "many of the standard moves in market anarchist theory today are already in evidence in Tandy".

Tandy was a member of the "Denver Circle", a group associated with Benjamin Tucker who contributed to the periodical Liberty.

== See also ==
- List of books about anarchism
