= Victor Henri Rochefort, Marquis de Rochefort-Luçay =

French writer and politician (1831-1913)

Henri Rochefort Marquis de Rochefort-Luçay
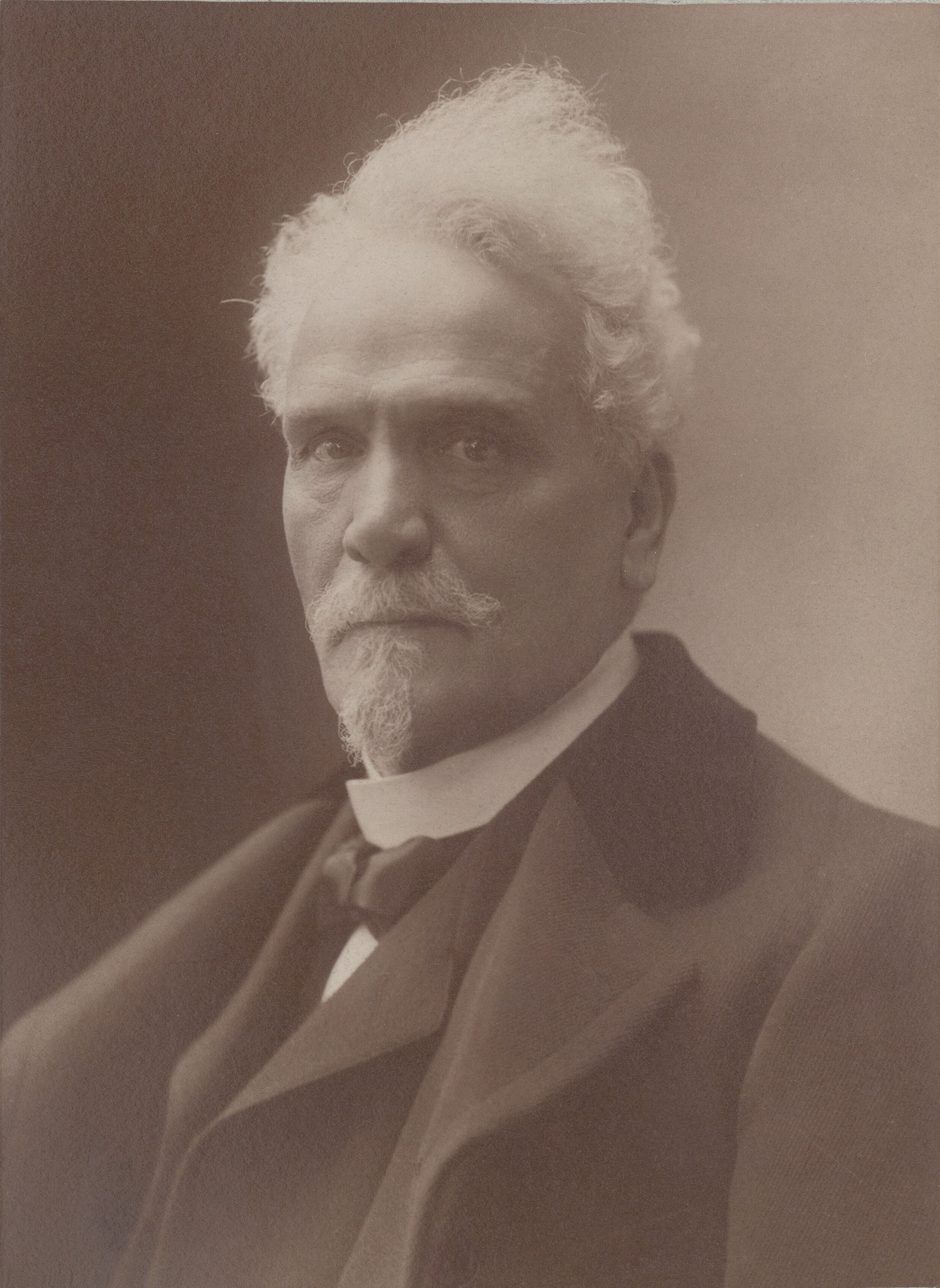
- Henri Rochefort, by Nadar
- Born: Victor Henri Rochefort; 30 January 1831; Paris, France
- Died: 30 June 1913 (aged 82); Aix-les-Bains, France
- Resting place: Montmartre Cemetery
- Occupations: Journalist, politician, playwright

Victor Henri Rochefort, Marquis de Rochefort-Luçay (French pronunciation: [viktɔʁ ɑ̃ʁi ʁɔʃfɔʁ maʁki də ʁɔʃfɔʁ lysɛ]; 30 January 1831 – 30 June 1913) was a French writer of vaudevilles and politician. He was born in Paris and died in Aix-les-Bains.

== Life ==
His father was a Legitimist noble who, as Edmond Rochefort, was well known as a writer of vaudevilles; his mother's views were republican. After experience as a medical student, a clerk at the Hôtel de Ville in Paris, a playwright and a journalist, he joined the staff of Le Figaro in 1863; but a series of his articles, afterwards published as Les Français de la décadence (3 vols., 1866–68), brought the paper into collision with the authorities and caused the termination of his engagement.

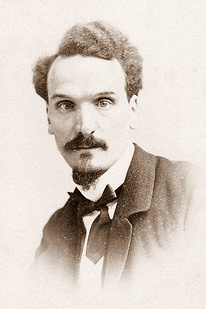
Rochefort circa 1865. Photo by Disderi

In collaboration with different dramatists he had meanwhile written a long series of successful vaudevilles, which began with the Monsieur bien mis at the Théâtre des Folies-Dramatiques in 1856. On leaving Le Figaro Rochefort determined to start a paper of his own, La Lanterne. The paper was seized on its eleventh appearance, and in August 1868 Rochefort was fined 10,000 francs, with a year's imprisonment.

He then published his paper in Brussels, whence it was smuggled into France. Printed in French, English, Spanish, Italian and German, it went the round of Europe. After a second prosecution he fled to Belgium. A series of duels, of which the most famous was one fought with Paul de Cassagnac à propos of an article on Joan of Arc, kept Rochefort in the public eye.

In 1869, after two unsuccessful candidatures, he was returned to the Corps Législatif, (the then lower house of the French Parliament) by the first circonscription of Paris. He was arrested on the frontier, only to be almost immediately released, and forthwith took his seat.

He renewed his onslaught on the Empire, starting a new paper, La Marseillaise, as the organ of political meetings arranged by himself at La Villette. The staff was appointed on the votes of the members, and included Victor Noir and Paschal Grousset. The violent articles in this paper led to the duel which resulted in January 1870 in Grousset's second, Victor Noir, being shot and killed by Prince Pierre Bonaparte. The paper was seized, and Rochefort and Grousset were sent to prison for six months.

The revolution of September was the signal for his release. He became a member of the Government of National Defence, but this short association with the forces of law and order was soon broken on account of his openly expressed sympathy with the Communards. On 11 May 1871, he fled in disguise from Paris. A week earlier he had resigned with a handful of other deputies from the National Assembly rather than countenance the dismemberment of France. Arrested at Meaux by the Versailles government, he was detained for some time in prison with a nervous illness before he was condemned under military law to imprisonment for life.

In spite of Victor Hugo's efforts on his behalf, he was transported to New Caledonia. In 1874, he escaped on board an American vessel to San Francisco. He lived in London and Geneva until the general amnesty permitted his return to France in 1880. In Geneva, he resumed the publication of La Lanterne, and in the Parisian papers articles constantly appeared from his pen.

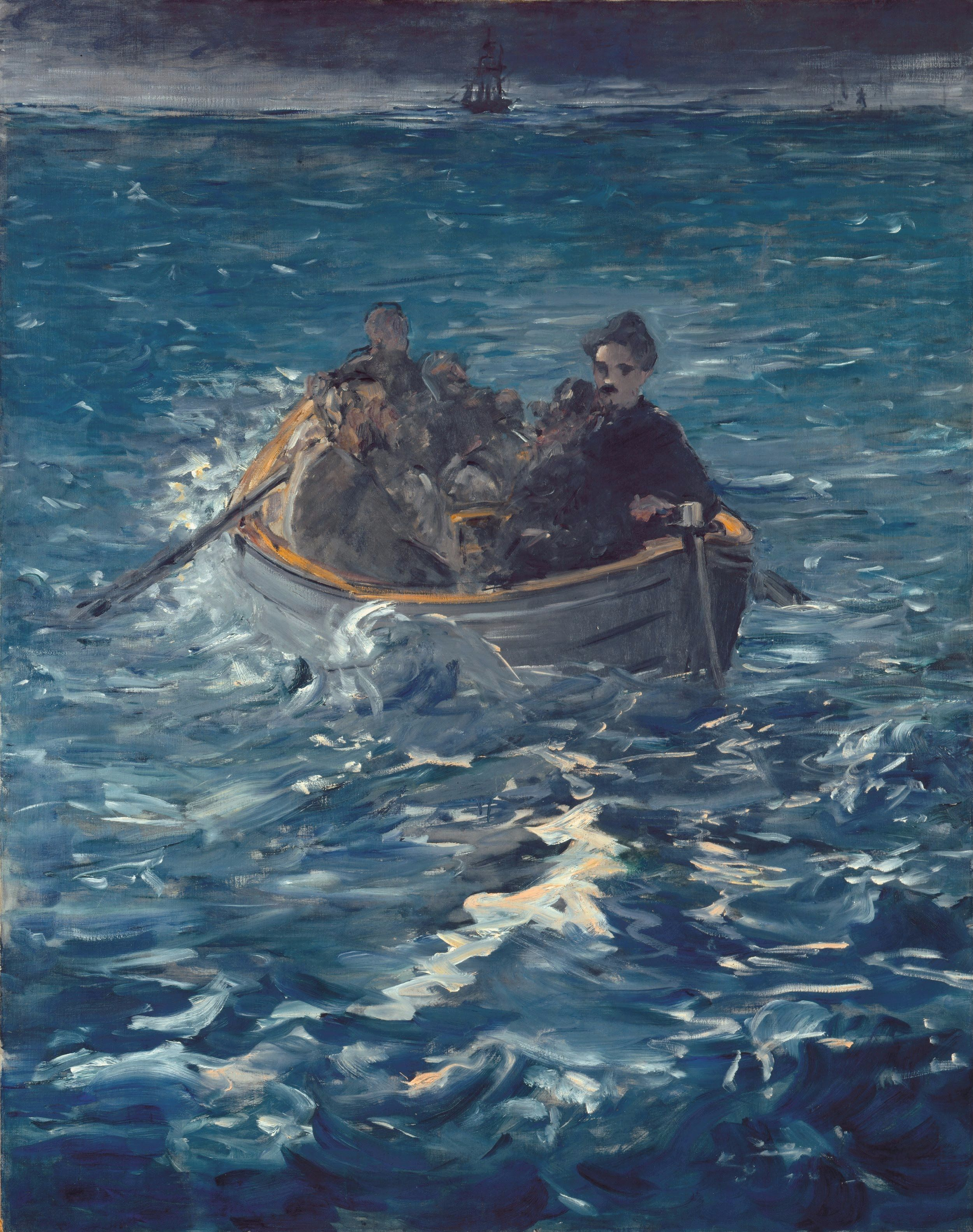
Rochefort's Escape by Édouard Manet (1881)

When at length, in 1880, the general amnesty permitted his return to Paris, he founded L'Intransigeant in the radical and socialist interest. For a short time in 1885–86 he sat in the Chamber of Deputies, but found a great opportunity next year for his talent for inflaming public opinion in the Boulangist agitation. He was condemned to detention in a fortress in August 1889 at the same time as General Boulanger, whom he had followed into exile. He continued his polemic from London, and after the suicide of General Boulanger he attacked M. Constans, minister of the interior in the Freycinet cabinet, with the utmost violence, in a series of articles which led to an interpellation in the chamber in circumstances of wild excitement and disorder.

The Panama scandals furnished him with another occasion, and he created something of a sensation by a statement in Le Figaro that he had met M. Clemenceau at the table of the financier Cornelius Herz. In 1895 he returned to Paris, two years before the Dreyfus affair supplied him with another point d'appui. He became prominent among the anti-Dreyfusards along with people such as Edouard Drumont and Hubert-Joseph Henry, and had a principal share in the organization of the press campaign. Subsequently, he was editor of La Patrie. As a result of his aristocratic descent, this journalistic author is remembered today as "the prince of press controversy" ("le Prince des polémistes").

== Personal life ==
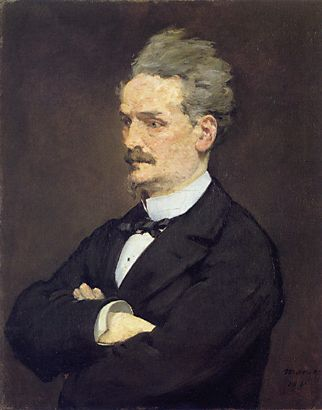
Édouard Manet: Henri Rochefort (1881)

Henri had a long-standing relationship with editor/translator Anna-Catherine Strebinger, whom he married in May 1878. Anna-Catherine is featured prominently as "Catherine" in Wanda von Sacher-Masoch's memoir Confessions de Ma Vie. Catherine did translations of many of the works of Leopold von Sacher-Masoch. In her book, Wanda describes Catherine's relationship with Henri as being open, with Catherine openly taking many lovers.

His daughter, Noémie de Rochefort-Luçay, was a lifelong friend of British suffragette leader Emmeline Pankhurst, having met whilst at École Normale de Neuilly in Paris. She later married Swiss artist Auguste Frederic Dufaux, known as Frederic, and had three children including aviation pioneers Henri Dufaux and Armand Dufaux. Henri Rochefort financially supported his grandson's initial aeronautic experiments. Frederic Dufaux sculpted the bust for his father-in-law's grave at the Montmartre cemetery in Paris.

== Works ==
Besides his plays and articles in the journals Rochefort published several separate works, among them being:

- Les Petits Mystères de l'Hôtel des Ventes (1862), a collection of his art criticisms
- Les Dépravés (Geneva, 1882)
- Les Naufrageurs (1876)
- L'Évadé (1883)
- Napoléon dernier (3 vols., 1884)
- Les Aventures de ma vie (5 vols., 1896)
  - The adventures of my life (2 vol. translation), E. Arnold, 1896

== Distinctions ==
A street in the 17th arrondissement of Paris, Rue Henri Rochefort, is named after him.

== General sources ==
- Roger Lawrence Williams, Henri Rochefort, Prince of the Gutter Press, Scribner, 1966.
- The World That Never Was: A True Story of Dreamers, Schemers, Anarchists and Secret Police by Alex Butterworth (Pantheon Books, 2010)
