= Martin A. Miller =

American historian

- Occupation: Historian
- Known for: Kropotkin (1976 biography)

Academic background
- Education: University of Maryland, College Park
- Alma mater: University of Chicago
- Thesis: The Formative Years of P. A. Kropotkin, 1842–1876: A Study of the Origins and Development of Populist Attitudes in Russia (1967)

Academic work
- Institutions: Trinity College of Arts & Sciences, Duke University

Martin A. Miller is an American historian of modern Russia, psychoanalysis, and terrorism.

== Selected works ==
- Kropotkin (1976)
- The Russian Revolutionary Emigrés, 1825–1870 (1986)
- Freud and the Bolsheviks: Psychoanalysis in Imperial Russia and the Soviet Union (1999)
- The Foundations of Modern Terrorism (2013)
