= Living Anarchism =

2015 biography of José Peirats by Chris Ealham

- First edition
- Author: Chris Ealham
- Subject: Biography
- Published: 2015 (AK Press)
- Pages: 336

Living Anarchism: José Peirats and the Spanish Anarcho-Syndicalist Movement is a biography of Spanish anarcho-syndicalist and historian of anarchism José Peirats written by Chris Ealham and published by AK Press in 2015. It was subsequently published in Spanish as Vivir la anarquía, vivir la utopía (2016).

== Bibliography ==
- Evans, Danny (2016). "Rev. of Living Anarchism: José Peirats and the Spanish Anarcho-Syndicalist Movement by Chris Ealham". European History Quarterly. 46 (4): 727–728. doi:10.1177/0265691416658234l. ISSN 0265-6914. S2CID 152033254.
- Guirao, Pedro García (2018). "Rev. of Living Anarchism: José Peirats and the Spanish Anarcho-Syndicalist Movement; Goals and Means: Anarchism, Syndicalism, and Internationalism in the Origins of the Federacion Anarquista Iberica". Journal for the Study of Radicalism. 12 (2): 188–192. doi:10.14321/jstudradi.12.2.0188. ISSN 1930-1189. JSTOR 10.14321/jstudradi.12.2.0188. Project MUSE 703888.
- Hernández, Óscar Freán (Autumn 2016). "Rev. of Vivir la anarquía, vivir la utopía. José Peirats y la historia del anarcosindicalismo español". Cahiers de civilisation espagnole contemporaine. De 1808 au temps présent (in Spanish) (17). doi:10.4000/ccec.6359. ISSN 1957-7761. Archived from the original on November 28, 2021.
- Hernández, Óscar Freán (2018). "Rev. of Living Anarchism: José Peirats and the Spanish Anarcho-Syndicalist Movement by Chris Ealham". Journal of Social History. 52 (1): 201–203. doi:10.1093/jsh/shx007. ISSN 0022-4529.
- Hoyos, Francisco Martínez (2016). "Review of Vivir La Anarquía, Vivir La Utopía". El Ciervo (in Spanish). 65 (756): 44. ISSN 0045-6896. JSTOR 26359989.
- Muñoz, Julián Vadillo (2017). "Chris Ealham, Vivir la anarquía, vivir la utopía. José Peirats y la historia del anarcosindicalismo español, Madrid, Alianza Editorial, 2016, 338 páginas". Hispania Nova (in Spanish). 15: 538–540. doi:10.20318/hn.2017.3503. ISSN 1138-7319. Archived from the original on November 28, 2021.
- Ortiz, David (2016). "Rev. of Living Anarchism: José Peirats and the Spanish Anarcho-Syndicalist Movement by Chris Ealham". Bulletin for Spanish and Portuguese Historical Studies. 41 (1). doi:10.26431/0739-182X.1237. ISSN 0739-182X. Archived from the original on November 28, 2021.
- Sharlamanov, Kire (2019). "Chris Ealham, Living Anarchism: José Peirats and the Spanish Anarcho-Syndicalist Movement". International Sociology. 34 (5): 593–596. doi:10.1177/0268580919870697a. ISSN 0268-5809. S2CID 204367026.
