= For Anarchism =

1989 book of essays

- First edition (p/b)
- Editor: David Goodway
- Subject: Anarchism
- Published: 1989 (Routledge)
- Pages: 278
- ISBN: 0-415-02954-6

For Anarchism: History, Theory, and Practice is a 1989 book of essays by anarchists on the history, theory, and practice of anarchism. The essays, derived from Leeds Anarchist Research Group meetings in 1985 and 1986, was edited by David Goodway and published by Routledge.

== See also ==
- List of books about anarchism
