= Ivan Avakumović =

Canadian historian (1926–2013)

- Born: August 22, 1926; Belgrade, Yugoslavia
- Died: July 16, 2013 (aged 86); Vancouver, British Columbia, Canada
- Education: University of Oxford (BA); University of London (MA); University of Oxford (PhD)
- Occupation: Professor emeritus of History

Ivan Avakumović (also spelled Avakumovich; 22 August 1926 – 16 July 2013) was a Canadian historian who was professor emeritus of history at the University of British Columbia.

== Biography ==
Avakumović was born on 22 August 1926 in Belgrade, Serbia, then part of the Kingdom of Yugoslavia. His father was a Yugoslav diplomat. Following the Axis invasion of Yugoslavia in 1941, his family moved to England. He studied at King's College in Cambridge, earning an honours degree in economics and history in 1947. He then attended the University of London where he received an M.A. in History in 1954 before studying at Nuffield College at the University of Oxford where he obtained his PhD in 1958.

He married his wife, Solange, in 1957; they had one daughter together named Fiona.

Avakumović briefly taught at the University of Aberdeen in 1957 before immigrating to Canada in 1958 where he began teaching at the University of Manitoba. In 1963, he joined the University of British Columbia's faculty, initially teaching Political Science and then History beginning in 1969 until he retired in 1991.

Avakumović died on 16 July 2013 in Vancouver, British Columbia.

== Research interests ==
Avakumović's research interests lied in social and political movements in Europe and Canada since the late 19th-century, with a focus on radical left-wing movements. His studies were "mostly concerned with radical forms of social critique in culturally and ethnically divided societies". His writings on politics were influenced by the works of Donald Cameron Watt, Hugh Seton-Watson and E. H. Carr.

== Books ==
- The Anarchist Prince: A Biographical Study of Peter Kropotkin, co-authored with George Woodcock. (London; 1950) ISBN 0805203052
- History of the Communist Party of Yugoslavia, Volume I (Aberdeen; The Aberdeen University Press, 1964)
- The Doukhobors, co-authored with George Woodcock. (Oxford University Press, 1968; Toronto; repub McClelland and Stewart, 1977). ISBN 978-0-77109-807-9
- Mihailović prema nemačkim dokumentima (London; Savez Oslobodjenje, 1969).
- The Communist Party in Canada: A History (Toronto; McClelland and Stewart, 1975).
- Socialism in Canada: A Study of the CCF-NDP in Federal and Provincial Politics (Toronto; McClelland and Stewart, 1978).
- Détruire le PCF: Archives de l'Etat français et de l'occupant hitlérien 1940–1944, co-authored with Roger Bourderon. (Paris; Messidor/Editions sociales, 1988)
