= London Chartism, 1838–1848 =

1982 history on Chartism in London

- Author: David Goodway
- Subject: History of London
- Published: 1982 (Cambridge University Press)
- Pages: 333
- ISBN: 0-52123-867-6

London Chartism, 1838–1848 is a 1982 book-length history of the 19th century Chartism social movement in London, as written by David Goodway and published by Cambridge University Press.
