= The Politics of Individualism =

1993 political science book by L. Susan Brown

- Author: L. Susan Brown
- Language: English
- Subject: Individualism, Liberalism, Liberal feminism, Anarchism
- Published: 1993 (Black Rose Books)
- Publication place: United States
- Media type: Print
- Pages: 198 pp.
- ISBN: 1-895431-79-4
- OCLC: 491469138

The Politics of Individualism: Liberalism, Liberal Feminism, and Anarchism is a 1993 political science book by L. Susan Brown.

== Contents ==
She begins by noting that liberalism and anarchism seem at times to share common components, but on other occasions are in direct opposition to one another. She argues that what they have in common is "existential individualism", the belief in freedom for freedom's sake. However, she notes that in liberal works there exists also an "instrumental individualism", by which she means freedom to satisfy individual interests. Brown argues that the latter annihilates the intentions of the former because it allows individuals the "freedom" to disrupt the freedom of other individuals in its aim of achieving individual goals. On the other hand, instrumental individualism requires some degree of existential individualism to sustain itself.

Next Brown looks at how these ideas of individualism were used in the liberal feminist writings of John Stuart Mill, Betty Friedan, Janet Radcliffe Richards, and Carole Pateman. She finds that the existential individualism expressed in some passages of these authors writings are effectively countered by notions of instrumental individualism contained elsewhere. Next she looks at how individualism was used by anarchists such as Emma Goldman and Alexander Berkman, and sees them as maintaining a consistency of existential individualism. However, she sees this as being less the case for other anarchists, including Pierre Proudhon, Peter Kropotkin, Mikhail Bakunin, and Murray Bookchin, who, rather than seeing individuals as existentially free to create their own destiny, devise other means to explain why such a society would work. For instance, she criticizes Kropotkin and Bakunin's efforts to define human nature as innately cooperative as unnecessary, seeing human nature as inexistent or as socially developed. Brown sees existentialism as a better alternative, because it allows anarchists "to shift the grounds of debate away from 'human nature' with all its attendant problems, toward a consideration of how we can create freedom for ourselves and others."^{1} She next looks at the existentialist works of Simone de Beauvoir, seeing her overall notion of the world as created by human individuals as compatible with anarchism.

She ends by arguing that anarchism has to be feminist or ceases to be anarchism, and those anarchists who are not feminists only compromise their commitment to anarchism by ignoring the domination of women by men. Brown argues that this is true not only for feminism, but for all forms of identity politics. Although she does not argue that feminism has to be anarchist, she does say that anarchism has much to offer feminism as a movement. The same, she says, is true for anarchism, which generally does not often take into account feminist ideas of child-raising and education. For instance, the idea of raising children existentially free from their parents and educated nonhierarchically by a community, is an area of thought not often considered by anarchists.

== See also ==
- List of books about anarchism
