= Kropotkin (urban locality) =

Kropotkin (Russian: Кропо́ткин) is the name of several urban localities in Russia:

- Kropotkin, Krasnodar Krai, a town in Kavkazsky District of Krasnodar Krai
- Kropotkin, Irkutsk Oblast, a work settlement in Bodaybinsky District of Irkutsk Oblast
