= David Goodway =

British historian

- Born: 1942 (age 83–84); Rugby, Warwickshire, England

Academic background
- Education: Corpus Christi College, Oxford; Birkbeck College, London
- Doctoral advisor: Eric Hobsbawm

Academic work
- Discipline: Historian
- Institutions: University of Leeds
- Main interests: Chartism, anarchism
- Notable works: London Chartism, 1838–1848 (1982); For Anarchism (1989); Anarchist Seeds Beneath the Snow (2006)

David Goodway (born 1942) is a British historian and a respected international authority on Chartism and on anarchism and libertarian socialism.

== Life ==
Goodway was born in the English Midlands town of Rugby in September 1942. He studied Philosophy, Politics and Economics at Corpus Christi College, Oxford. His doctoral thesis was supervised by the renowned historian Eric Hobsbawm and formed the basis of his first book on the history of Chartism in London, London Chartism, an acknowledged classic work on the subject. He has had a long-running interest in the Chartist George Julian Harney and discovered that a considerable portion of Harney's personal library is held at Vanderbilt University in Tennessee. He taught at the University of Leeds from 1969 to 2005.

Goodway has had a lifelong engagement with literature and in 1969 was a founder member of the Powys Society, which promotes the appreciation and study particularly of John Cowper Powys. He has edited the correspondence between Powys and the American anarchist Emma Goldman.

He has also written widely about writers in the British left libertarian tradition, such as William Morris, Alex Comfort, Herbert Read, George Orwell, Colin Ward and Maurice Brinton - notably in his book Anarchist Seeds Beneath the Snow: Left-Libertarian Thought and British Writers from William Morris to Colin Ward. In 2015, he became a member of the Friends of Freedom Press Ltd, which safeguards the interest of the anarchist publisher the Freedom Press. He wrote an appreciation of the anarchist journal Freedom when it stopped regular publication after almost 130 years.

== Selected publications ==
- London Chartism, 1838–1848 (1982)
- For Anarchism: History, Theory, and Practice (editor) (1989)
- Against Power and Death: The Anarchist Articles and Pamphlets of Alex Comfort (editor)(1994)
- A One-Man Manifesto and Other Writings for Freedom Press by Herbert Read (editor) (1994)
- Herbert Read Reassessed (editor) (1998)
- Talking Anarchy (with Colin Ward) (2003, 2nd edition 2014)
- For Workers' Power: The Selected Writings of Maurice Brinton (editor) (2004, 2nd edition 2020)
- Anarchist Seeds Beneath the Snow: Left-Libertarian Thought and British Writers from William Morris to Colin Ward (2006, 2nd edition 2012)
- The Letters of John Cowper Powys and Emma Goldman (editor) (2007)
- Nicolas Walter, The Anarchist Past and Other Essays (editor) (2007)
- John Cowper Powys, The Art of Forgetting the Unpleasant and Other Essays (editor) (2008)
- Nicolas Walter, Damned Fools in Utopia and Other Writings on Anarchism and War Resistance (editor) (2011)
- The Real History of Chartism: or eight fallacies about the Chartist movement (2013)
- George Julian Harney, The Chartists were Right: selections from the Newcastle Weekly Chronicle, 1890-97 (editor) (2014)
- G.D.H. Cole, Towards a Libertarian Socialism: reflections on the British Labour Party and European working-class movements (editor) (2021)
- Left-Libertarian Currents: Anarchism, Literature and Historiography In Modern Britain (2026)
