= The Crystal Spirit =

1966 book by George Woodcock

- Author: George Woodcock
- Subject: Literary criticism
- Publisher: Little, Brown and Company
- Publication date: 1966
- Pages: 366

The Crystal Spirit: A Study of George Orwell is a 1966 book of literary criticism by George Woodcock, analyzing the works and life of George Orwell.

== Bibliography ==
- Capouya, Emile (April 28, 1967). "The Screen: A Successful Accident". Commonweal. p. 180.
- Donoghue, Denis (December 20, 1984). "Plain English". London Review of Books. pp. 7–8. ISSN 0260-9592.
- Epstein, Joseph (May 1967). "Hero for Our Time". Commentary. pp. 102–106.
- Kubal, David L. (1967). "The Underground of Nineteen Eighty-Four". The Review of Politics. 29 (1): 115–117. doi:10.1017/S0034670500023780. ISSN 0034-6705. JSTOR 1405818.
- Mayne, Richard (October 6, 1966). "George Orwell and His Critics". The Reporter. pp. 54–55.
