= Kropotkin (biography) =

1976 book by Martin A. Miller

- First edition
- Author: Martin A. Miller
- Subject: Biography
- Published: 1976 (University of Chicago Press)
- Pages: 342
- ISBN: 978-0226525938

Kropotkin is a biography of the Russian anarchist Peter Kropotkin written by historian Martin A. Miller and first published in 1976 by University of Chicago Press.

In comparison to the earlier Kropotkin biography, The Anarchist Prince, written by George Woodcock and Ivan Avakumović in 1950, Miller's Kropotkin was more comparatively more scholarly and critical, with a fuller bibliography.
