= Anarchist Seeds Beneath the Snow =

2006 book by David Goodway

- First edition
- Author: David Goodway
- Subject: Anarchist politics, history, philosophy
- Published: 2006
- Pages: 448
- ISBN: 978-1-60486-221-8

Anarchist Seeds Beneath the Snow is a 2006 book about anarchism and left-libertarian thought in Britain written by David Goodway and published by Liverpool University Press. A new edition was published in 2012 by PM Press. Anarchist Seeds Beneath the Snow is a substantial and well-referenced work of 434 pages and comprises fifteen chapters and a new lengthy afterword. The book documents left-libertarian thought and British writers from William Morris to Colin Ward. Goodway received help from many institutions and people which he acknowledged in the original edition and complemented in the new edition.
