= Hanna M. Roisman =

British scholar in classics and ancient history

- Born: 1 December 1948 (age 77)

Academic background
- Education: Tel Aviv University (BA), University of Washington (PhD)
- Thesis: Loyalty in Early Greek Epic and Tragedy (1981)

Academic work
- Discipline: Classics
- Sub-discipline: Greek Tragedy; Homer; Classical Reception
- Institutions: Tel Aviv University, University of Washington, Cornell University, Colby College

Hanna M. Roisman is the Arnold Bernhard Professor in Arts and Humanities (Emerita) and a professor of Classics specialising in Greek Drama and Greek Epic poetry at Colby College.

== Early life and education ==
Roisman studied for her BA and MA degrees in classics at Tel Aviv University, completing an MA Thesis on “Hebrew Translations of Horace by Shaul Tschernichovski.” She moved to the University of Washington for her PhD on "Loyalty in Early Greek Epic and Tragedy" completed in 1981.

== Academic career ==
Before 1990, Roisman held a post at Cornell University. In 1990 Roisman and her husband (Yossi Roisman) joined Colby College, where they had been invited to lead the classics department. By 2008 she had been named the Francis F. Bartlett and K. Bartlett Professor of Classics. She has held multiple fellowships, including a fellowship at the Centre for Hellenic Studies in 1985–6, the Tytus Fellowship in 2007–2008 at the University of Cincinnati, and a fellowship at the Institute of Advanced Studies in the Humanities at the University of Edinburgh in 2009. In 2012, she was appointed to the Arnold Bernhard Professorship in the Arts and Humanities, a post she held until her retirement. She continues to be associated as a Scholar in Residence with the American University.

Roisman is best known for her work on Greek literature, especially drama and epic. Her book Nothing Is As It Seems: The Tragedy of the Implicit in Euripides’ Hippolytus (1999) was praised for its novelty, and her works aimed at student audiences or for use in teaching have attracted particular positive interest, with Laura McClure describing Tragic Heroines (2021) as "an excellent addition not only to a stand-alone course on women in Greek tragedy... but also of service to a general course on women and gender in antiquity."

== Selected publications ==
- Loyalty in Early Greek Epic and Tragedy (1984);
- Nothing is As It Seems: The Tragedy of the Implicit in Euripides' Hippolytus (1999);
- Sophocles: Philoctetes (2005);
- Sophocles: Electra: Translation with Notes (2008/2017); and Sophocles' Electra: A Commentary (2020);
- Tragic Heroines (2021).
