= Kropotkin and the Rise of Revolutionary Anarchism =

Book by Caroline Cahm

- Author: Caroline Cahm
- Subject: Intellectual history
- Publisher: Cambridge University Press
- Publication date: 1989
- Pages: 372
- ISBN: 9780521364454

Kropotkin and the Rise of Revolutionary Anarchism, 1872–1886 is a history book by Caroline Cahm that traces anarchist Peter Kropotkin's ideas and influence within European radicalism and socialism during his life.
