= Pierre-Joseph Proudhon (Woodcock biography) =

1956 biography by George Woodcock

- First edition
- Author: George Woodcock
- Subject: Biography
- Published: 1956 (Macmillan)
- Pages: 292

Pierre-Joseph Proudhon is a biography of the French anarchist written by George Woodcock and first published in 1956 by Macmillan.
