= Uri Gordon (Zionist) =

Zionist and Israeli official

- אורי גורדון
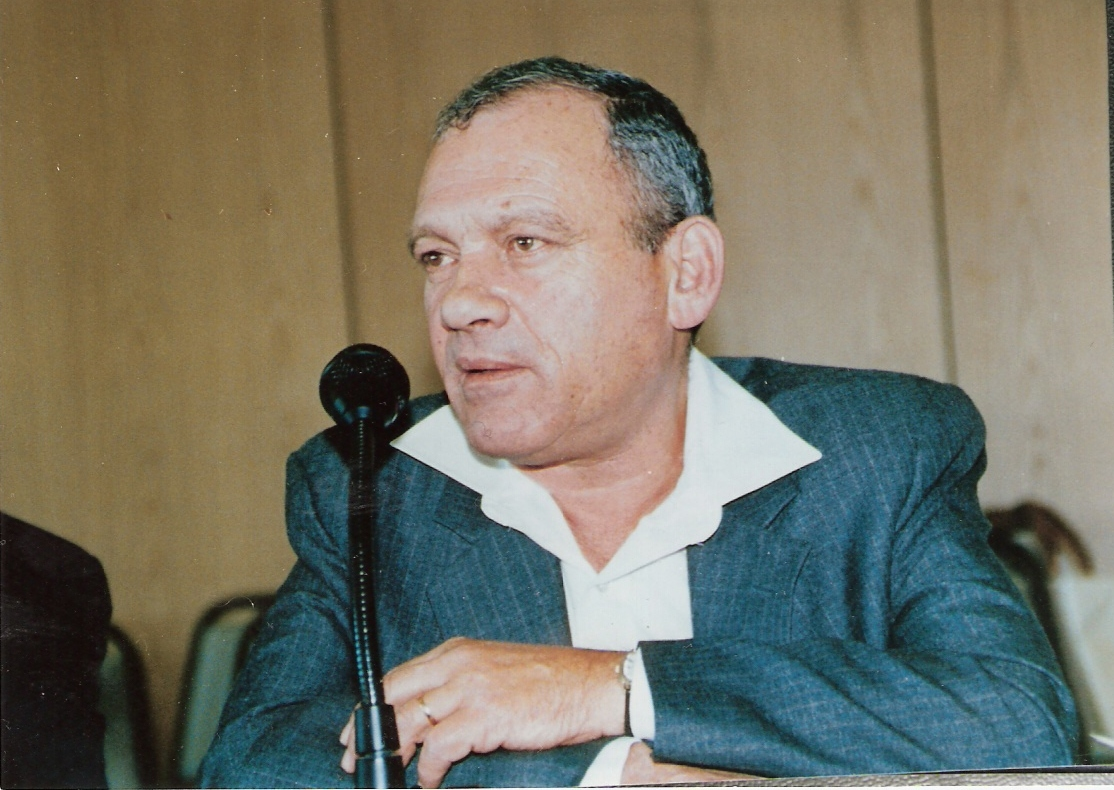
- Born: 1935; Tel Aviv
- Died: July 30, 2000 (aged 65)

Uri Gordon (Hebrew: אורי גורדון; 1935 – 2000) was an Israeli official and Zionist active in the return and resettlement of Ethiopian and Russian Jews in Israel during the 1980s and 1990s.
