= Anarchism (Woodcock book) =

Book by George Woodcock

- First edition
- Author: George Woodcock
- Published: 1962 (World Publishing Company)
- Pages: 504
- OCLC: 179826

Anarchism: A History of Libertarian Ideas and Movements is a 1962 book about the history of anarchism by George Woodcock.
