= The World That Never Was =

2010 book by Alex Butterworth

The World That Never Was: A True Story of Dreamers, Schemers, Anarchists, and Secret Agents
- Author: Alex Butterworth
- Language: English
- Subject: History of anarchism
- Published: 2010 (The Bodley Head)
- Media type: Print, e-book
- Pages: 482
- ISBN: 9780224078078

The World That Never Was: A True Story of Dreamers, Schemers, Anarchists, and Secret Agents is a 2010 book by Alex Butterworth about anarchism in the late 19th and early 20th centuries in Europe and the United States.

== Overview ==
The book begins with the story of the exposure of Yevno Azef, a leading member of Russia's Socialist Revolutionary Party, as an agent of the Okhrana in 1908. Butterworth then moves on to the events preceding the Paris Commune of 1871, including biographical sketches of the French anarchist and geographer Élisée Reclus and the German spy Wilhelm Stieber; and the Commune itself, with an account centring on the experience of Louise Michel, an anarchist and school teacher. The following chapters focus on the activities of the Russian anarchist and geographer Peter Kropotkin, the French radical Victor Henri Rochefort, Marquis de Rochefort-Luçay, the Russian revolutionary Nikolai Tchaikovsky and the Russian spy Pyotr Rachkovsky in the 1870s.

Butterworth's focus then moves to London, focusing in particular on the artist and writer William Morris; and to Chicago and the events leading up to the Haymarket affair of 1886 including Johann Most's lecture tour (which began in 1883). The chapters that follow focus on the activities of London's Metropolitan Police Service and its Special Branch (including around Bloody Sunday), Rachkovsky's work in Paris in the late 1880s, William Melville's pursuit of anarchists in London, and the change in public perception of anarchism and anarchists concurrent with the emergence of propaganda of the deed and Leon Czolgosz's assassination of U.S. President William McKinley. The final chapters deal with the deaths of Michel and Reclus, the Russian revolutions of 1905 and 1917, and Kropotkin's death in 1921.

== Critical reception ==
Mike Rapport of BBC History praised Butterworth's sympathetic treatment of his subjects and described the book as "intriguing, provocative and written with a novelist’s eye for detail ... an engrossing journey". In The Guardian, anarchist writer Stuart Christie noted the relevance of the book's themes to contemporary tactics in policing and the Metropolitan Police Service's reluctance to make public files from the 1890s. Francis Wheen, writing in the Financial Times, wrote that the book was "exhilarating" and questioned whether "the world that never was – one ignoring borders, and divisions of class and religion – [might] resemble the world as it might one day be"; while Peter Preston of The Observer described Butterworth's story as one "full of bathos as well as bombs, of a naivety that fomented revolution but never controlled what happened next" and also noted its relevance to 21st-century terrorism.

Wendy Smith in the Los Angeles Times praised "Butterworth's deeply knowledgeable, exceedingly well-written text" for its awareness of anarchism's shortcomings, and The Washington Post's John Smolens described The World That Never Was as a "thorough, compelling examination" capable of portraying "anarchism as the product of an inexorable human impulse" and questioning whether anarchist ideas may persist in the present. Mark Mazower of Bookforum commended the book for showing the significance of the period between 1870 and 1914 in shaping the leftism, activism and terrorism, and political repression, and wrote that it was "none the worse for" being "very much a tale of anarchism for own times".

In the New Statesman, philosopher John N. Gray described the book as "one of the most absorbing depictions of the dark underside of radical politics in many years" but questioned its lack of extended analysis. Richard Alexander of Lobster assessed The World That Never Was as "a highly readable and entertaining (and occasionally thoughtful) text" and recommended it as an introduction to the activities of the revolutionaries and anti-revolutionaries of the period. David Peers, in the anarchist newspaper Freedom, recommended the "racily and colourfully written" book while pointing outs its omission of anarcho-syndicalism and anarchism in Ukraine and Mexico.

Socialist feminist writer Sheila Rowbotham, writing in The Independent, wrote that "The World That Never Was conveys the labyrinthine coils of conspirators and spies with graphic panache" but noted Butterworth's failure to convey his characters' ideals and motives, and his imprecise referencing style. Leo McKinstry of the Daily Express praised the book's scope and its "rich cast of characters" but argued it was let down by Butterworth's style and his sympathy for his subjects. Writing for The A.V. Club, Samantha Nelson gave the book a rating of "B−", explaining that "Butterworth's fascination with the era is a mixed blessing"; while Clif Garboden of the Boston Phoenix questioned the book's style and presentation but described it as "interesting, important, impressively (too) thorough, fair, and eye-opening". In the International Socialist Review, Eric Kerl wrote "The World That Never Was brilliantly contextualizes the political radicalism of the time", but criticised Butterworth's ambivalence towards Marxism and Leninism and lack of an analysis of revolutionary strategy.

== See also ==
- History of terrorism
