= Chris Ealham =

British historian and hispanist

- Born: 1965 (age 60–61); Kent, South East England, UK
- Occupation: Lecturer

Academic background
- Education: Queen Mary & Westfield College
- Thesis: Policing the Recession: Unemployment, Social Protest and Law-and-Order in Republican Barcelona, 1930-1936 (1995)
- Doctoral advisor: Paul Preston

Academic work
- Discipline: History
- Sub-discipline: Hispanism
- Institutions: Cardiff University, Wales; Lancaster University, England; Saint Louis University, Spain
- Main interests: Revisionism

Chris Ealham (born 1965) is an English historian and Hispanist. He specialises in the history of anarchism in Spain. His work has been translated into Castilian, Catalan and Italian. He writes for the Spanish daily and anarchist press on topics which range from football to urban planning.

== Biography ==
Ealham was born in Kent, South East England, in 1965. He initially obtained B.A. in Modern History and Politics from the Queen Mary and Westfield College, University of London. In 1995 he followed this with his PhD from the same university with his dissertation Policing the Recession: Unemployment, Social Protest and Law-and-Order in Republican Barcelona, 1930-1936, which was supervised by Paul Preston, the English historian and Hispanist.

Ealham was initially employed in Cardiff University, Wales, where he lectured on contemporary Spanish History in the School of European Studies. (Note: Preston and Mackenzie (1996) documented that Ealham was a lecturer in European Studies at University of Wales, College of Cardiff. (Preston & Mackenzie 1996, p. 12).) He was then employed as a lecturer in the Department of History in Lancaster University, England. He is currently employed as a lecturer in the Madrid Campus of the Saint Louis University in Spain. (Note: Cited in Living Anarchism José Peirats and the Spanish Anarcho-Syndicalist Movement Chris Ealham (Author).) He contributes to the often-acrimonious historiography of the Spanish Civil War, arguing that populist historians have promoted pro-Franco revisionism in the discipline.

== Critical reviews ==
Durgan (2005) and Getman-Eraso (2009) reviewed Ealham's 2005 Class, culture and conflict in Barcelona 1898-1937. Spanish historian José Luis Oyón (2009) described it as 'enormously valuable'.

Preston (2010) commented on Ealham's 2010 book Anarchy and the city:

It poses all kinds of comparisons with social and urban conflicts in other Spanish cities, most notably Madrid, Seville, and Zaragoza. In that regard, Earlham's work invites comparisons with the great classic on the Parisian working class, Louis Chevalier's Classes laborieuses et classes dangereuses à Paris pendant la première moitié du XIXe siècle. The comparisons to be made, with E.P. Thompson and with Louis Chevalier, are of the highest calibre. This suggests that, with this book, we are seeing the beginning of a major historical career.

Ealham's 2015 Living anarchism has attracted the most critical attention. Brook (2016) was one of several reviewers. He commented:

Ealham never met or interviewed Peirats, though he interviewed his partner, Gracia Ventura. This means that Living anarchism is the result of a huge amount of effort expended on archives and manuscripts. I found it remarkable just how much Ealham could pull from Peirats’ letters.

Another reviewer, Ortiz (2016), commented:

Chris Ealham has interpreted José Peirats’ life in a very tumultuous, critical historical moment. If one wants to gain a complete picture of Spain’s labor movement, anarchism, anarcho–syndicalism, Second Republic, Civil War, exile, and the biography of a man integral to all of it, then one ought to read this book. For those themes and more I find Living Anarchism to be … indispensable.

Other reviewers of Living anarchism include Evans (2016) and Hernández (2018).

== Publications ==
=== Articles ===
1990s

- 1993. "Crime and punishment in 1930s Barcelona". History Today. 43 (10): 31-37.
- 1994. "Anarco–Capitalistes, lumpenburgesía and the origins of anarchism in Catalonia". ACIS Journal. 7: 50-56.
- 1995. "Anarchism and Illegality in Barcelona, 1931-7". Contemporary European History. 4 (2): 133-151.
- 1998. "From mobilization to civil war. The politics of polarization in the Spanish city of Gijon, 1900-1937". The English Historical Review. 113 (454): 1364-1365.

2000s

- 2005a. "An Imagined Geography: Ideology, Urban Space, and Protest in the Creation of Barcelona's "Chinatown", c.1835–1936" (PDF). International Review of Social History. 50 (3): 373-397.
- 2007. "'Myths' and the Spanish Civil War: Some old, some exploded, some clearly borrowed and some almost 'blue'" (PDF). journal of Contemporary History. 42 (2): 365-376.
- 2008a. "Revolution and reaction in Spain". International Socialism (117). 2008.
- 2008b. "'The Struggle for the Streets': Unemployed hawkers, protest culture and repression in the Barcelona area (c. 1918–1936)" (PDF). Labour History Review. 73 (1): 19-38.
- 2009a. "Durruti in the Spanish Revolution". Anarchist Studies. 17 (1): 113-117.
- 2009b. "The 'Herodotus of the CNT': Jose Peirats and La CNT en la revolucion espanola". Anarchist Studies. 17 (2): 81-104.

2010s

- 2013a. "A soundtrack to revolution?". Anarchist Studies. 21 (2): 97-101.
- 2013b. "The Emperor's New Clothes: 'Objectivity' and Revisionism in Spanish History" (PDF). Journal of Contemporary History. 48 (1): 191-202.
- 2014a. "Playing for change: Music and musicians in the service of social movements". Rock Music Studies. 1 (1): 100-102.
- 2014b. "Spanish Anarcho-Syndicalists in Toulouse: The Red-and-Black Counter-City in Exile". Bulletin of Spanish Studies. 91 (1–2): 95-114.
- 2016. "Book review. Richard Bach Jensen, The battle against anarchist terrorism: An International history, 1878–1934". European History Quarterly. 46 (1): 146-148. 2016.
- 2017. "Social history, (Neo-)revisionism and mapping the 1930s Spanish left". Labor History. 58 (3): 245-270.

2020s

- 2022. "Immense enthusiasm and optimism : 'A Life For Anarchy: A Stuart Christie Reader' [book review]". KSL: Bulletin of the Kate Sharpley Library. 106: 4-5.
- 2024. "Book review. Arturo Zoffmann Rodríguez. The Spanish Anarchists and the Russian Revolution, 1917–24. Anguish and Enthusiasm.[Routledge/Cañada Blanch Studies on Contemporary Spain, Vol. 30.] Routledge, London [etc.] 2024. vii, 247 pp.£ 135.(E-book:£ 35.99.)" (PDF). International Review of Social History. 69 (3): 554-557.

=== Contributions ===
- 2013. Mintz, Frank. "Prologue". Anarchism and workers' self-managerment in revolutionary Spain. Oakland, California: AK Press. ISBN 978-1-84935-078-5.
- 2019. Preston, Paul; Mackenzie, Ann L. (eds.). "From the summit to the abyss: The contradictions of individualism and collectivism in Spanish anarchism". The Republic besieged Civil war in Spain 1936-1939. Edinburgh: Edinburgh University Press. ISBN 9781474471763.

=== Editorships ===
- 2001. Valls, José Peirats. The CNT in the Spanish Revolution, Volume 1. Hastings, East Sussex: The Meltzer Press. ISBN 1-901172-07-4.
- 2005a. Valls, José Peirats. The CNT in the Spanish Revolution, Volume 2. Hastings, East Sussex: Christie Books. ISBN 1-873976-24-0.
- 2005b. With Richards, Michael. The Splintering of Spain: Cultural History and the Spanish Civil War, 1936–1939 (PDF). New York: Cambridge University Press.
- 2006. Valls, José Peirats. The CNT in the Spanish Revolution, Volume 3. Hastings, East Sussex: Christie Books. ISBN 1-873976-29-1.

=== Books ===
- 2010 (originally 2005). Anarchism and the city Revolution and counter-revolution in Barcelona, 1898-1937 [originally "Class, culture and conflict in Barcelona 1898-1937"]. Oakland, California: AK Press. ISBN 978-1-84935-012-9.
- 2015. Living anarchism José Peirrats and the Spanish Anarcho-Syndicalist Movement. Oakland, California: AK Press. ISBN 978-1-84935-238-3.
