= George Woodcock =

Canadian writer, literary critic, philosopher, poet and theorist (1912–1995)

- Born: May 8, 1912; Winnipeg, Manitoba, Canada
- Died: January 28, 1995 (aged 82); Vancouver, British Columbia, Canada
- Parent(s): Arthur Woodcock (father); Margaret Gertrude Lewis (mother)
- Writing career
- Language: English
- Genres: Political biography, critical essays
- Subject: Anarchism

George Woodcock (May 8, 1912 – January 28, 1995) was a Canadian writer of political biography and history, an anarchist thinker, a philosopher, an essayist and literary critic. He was also a poet and published several volumes of travel writing. In 1959 he was the founding editor of the journal Canadian Literature which was the first academic journal specifically dedicated to Canadian writing. He is most commonly known outside Canada for his book Anarchism: A History of Libertarian Ideas and Movements (1962).

== Life ==
Woodcock was born in Winnipeg, Manitoba, but moved with his parents to England at an early age, attending Sir William Borlase's Grammar School in Marlow and Morley College. Though his family was quite poor, his grandfather offered to pay his tuition if he went to Cambridge University which he turned down due to the condition that he undertake seminary training for the Anglican clergy. Instead, he took a job as a clerk at the Great Western Railway and it was there that he first became interested in anarchism.

Woodcock remained an anarchist for the rest of his life, writing several books on the subject, including Anarchism, the anthology The Anarchist Reader (1977), and biographies of Pierre-Joseph Proudhon, William Godwin, Oscar Wilde and Peter Kropotkin. It was during these years that he met several prominent literary figures, including T. S. Eliot and Aldous Huxley, and forging a particularly close relationship with the art theorist Herbert Read. His first published work was The White Island, a collection of poetry, which was issued by Fortune Press in 1940.

Woodcock spent World War II working as a conscientious objector on a farm in Essex, and in 1949, moved to British Columbia. "As a proponent of civil disobedience in accordance with Henry David Thoreau, he followed the principles of Leo Tolstoy, M.K. Gandhi and Dr. Martin Luther King, Jr. As a pacifist, he dismissed the "folly" of revolutionary violence while emphasizing the need for the convergence of ends and means to prevent a new authoritarianism."

At Camp Angel in Oregon, a camp for conscientious objectors, Woodcock helped found the Untide Press, which sought to bring poetry to the public in an inexpensive but attractive format. Following the war, he returned to Canada, eventually settling in Vancouver, British Columbia. In 1955, he took a post in the English department of the University of British Columbia, where he stayed until the 1970s. Around this time he started to write more prolifically, producing several travel books and collections of poetry, as well as the works on anarchism for which he is best known in collaboration with Ivan Avakumović.

Toward the end of his life, Woodcock became increasingly interested in what he saw as the plight of Tibetans. He traveled to India, studied Buddhism, became friends with the Dalai Lama and established the Tibetan Refugee Aid Society. With Inge, his wife, he established Canada India Village Aid, which sponsors self-help projects in rural India. Both organizations exemplify his ideal of voluntary cooperation between people across national boundaries.

The Woodcocks established the Woodcock Fund to support professional Canadian writers. Since 1989, it provides financial assistance to writers in mid-book-project who face unforeseen financial needs that threaten the completion of their books. it is available to writers of fiction, creative non-fiction, plays, and poetry. The initial endowment of the program was in excess of two million dollars, is administered by the Writers' Trust of Canada and by March 2012 had distributed $887,273 to 180 Canadian writers.

George Woodcock died at his home in Vancouver, British Columbia, Canada, on January 28, 1995.

== Orwell ==
Woodcock first came to know George Orwell after they had a public disagreement in the pages of the Partisan Review. In his "London Letter" published in the March–April 1942 issue of the review, Orwell had written that in the context of a war against fascism, pacifism was "objectively pro-fascist". As the founder and editor of Now, an "anti-war paper" which Orwell had mentioned in his article as an example of publications that published contributions by both pacifists and fascists, Woodcock took exception to this. Woodcock stated that "the review had abandoned its position as an independent forum", and was now "the cultural review of the British Anarchist movement". Despite this difference, the two became good friends and kept up a correspondence until Orwell's death, and Now would publish Orwell's article "How the Poor Die" in its November 6, 1946 issue.

Woodcock and Orwell would both also be active members of the Freedom Defence Committee.

Woodcock later wrote The Crystal Spirit (1966), a critical study of Orwell and his work which won a Governor General's Award. The title is taken from the last line of the poem written by Orwell in memory of the Italian militiaman he met in Barcelona in December 1936 during the Spanish Civil War, a meeting Orwell describes in the opening lines to Homage to Catalonia (1938).

== Recognition ==
Woodcock was honoured with several awards, including a Fellowship of the Royal Society of Canada in 1968, the UBC Medal for Popular Biography in 1973 and 1976, and the Molson Prize in 1973. In 1970, he received an honorary doctorate from Sir George Williams University, which later became Concordia University. He only accepted awards from his peers, refusing several offered by the state, including the Order of Canada. He made one exception in 1994, receiving the Freedom of the City of Vancouver.

A biography, The Gentle Anarchist: A Life of George Woodcock, was released in 1998 by George Fetherling, and a documentary, George Woodcock: Anarchist of Cherry Street, by Tom Shandel and Alan Twigg.

== Selected bibliography ==
- Anarchy or Chaos – 1944
- William Godwin: A biographical study – 1946
- The Incomparable Aphra – 1948
- The Anarchist Prince: A Biographical Study of Peter Kropotkin – 1950 (with Ivan Avakumović)
- Ravens and Prophets – 1952
- Pierre-Joseph Proudhon – 1956
- To the City of the Dead: An Account of Travels in Mexico – 1957
- Incas and Other Men: Travels in the Andes – 1959
- Anarchism: A History of Libertarian Ideas and Movements – 1962
- Faces of India: A Travel Narrative – 1964
- Asia, Gods and Cities: Aden to Tokyo – 1966
- The Crystal Spirit: A Study of George Orwell – 1966
- The Greeks in India – 1966
- Kerala: A Portrait of the Malabar Coast – 1967
- The Doukhobors – 1968 (with Ivan Avakumovic)
- Henry Walter Bates: Naturalist of the Amazons – 1969
- The British in the Far East – 1969
- The British in the Middle East – 1970
- The Hudson's Bay Company – 1970
- Canada and the Canadians – 1970
- Into Tibet: The Early British Explorers – 1971
- Victoria – 1971
- Gandhi – Fontana Modern Masters, 1972
- Dawn and the Darkest Hour: A Study of Aldous Huxley – 1972
- The Rejection of Politics and Other Essays on Canada, Canadians, Anarchism and the World – 1972
- Herbert Read: The Stream and the Source – 1973
- Who Killed the British Empire?: An Inquest – 1974
- Amor de Cosmos: Journalist and Reformer – 1975
- Gabriel Dumont: The Métis Chief and his Lost World – 1975
- South Sea Journey – 1976
- Peoples of the Coast: The Indians of the Pacific Northwest – 1977
- The Anarchist Reader – 1977 (editor)
- Anima, or, Swann Grown Old: A Cycle of Poems – 1977
- Two Plays – 1977
- Thomas Merton Monk And Poet – A Critical Study – 1978
- The World of Canadian Writing: Critiques and Recollections – 1980
- 100 Great Canadians – 1980
- Confederation Betrayed! – 1981
- The Meeting of Time and Space: Regionalism in Canadian Literature – 1981
- Taking it to the Letter – 1981
- Letter to the Past: An Autobiography – 1982
- Orwell's Message: 1984 & the Present – 1984
- Strange Bedfellows: The State and the Arts in Canada – 1985
- The University of British Columbia: A Souvenir – 1986 (with Tim Fitzharris)
- Northern Spring: The Flowering of Canadian Literature in English – 1987
- Caves in the Desert: Travels in China – 1988
- The Purdy-Woodcock Letters: Selected Correspondence, 1964–1984 – 1988
- William Godwin: A Biographical Study – 1989
- A Social History of Canada – 1989
- Powers of Observation – 1989
- Oscar Wilde: The Double Image – 1989
- The Century that Made Us: Canada 1814–1914 – 1989
- British Columbia: A History of the Province – 1990
- Tolstoy at Yasnaya Polyana & Other Poems – 1991
- Anarchism and Anarchists: Essays – 1992
- The Cherry Tree on Cherry Street: And Other Poems – 1994
- Marvellous Century: Archaic Man and the Awakening of Reason – 2005

== See also ==
- Anarchism in Canada
