= Uri Gordon (anarchist) =

Israeli anarchist theorist and activist

- אורי גורדון
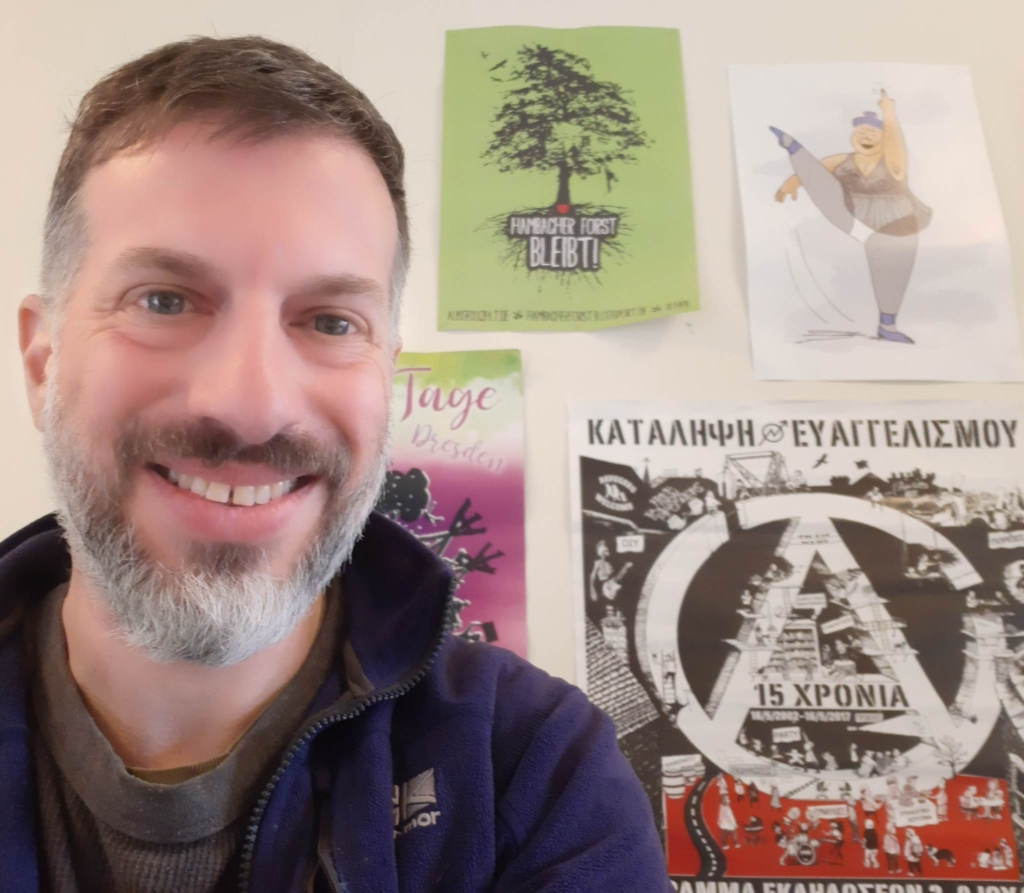
- Gordon in 2023
- Born: 1976 (age 49–50); Israel
- Education: University of Oxford
- Known for: Anarchist theory
- Notable work: Anarchy Alive!

Uri Gordon (Hebrew: אורי גורדון; born August 30, 1976, in Israel) is an anarchist theorist and activist. He is editor of Freedom. Gordon is considered "one of the leading theorists of anarchist movement politics." He has lived in Israel and Great Britain and worked with organizations including Indymedia, Peoples Global Action, Anarchists Against the Wall and Freedom Press.

== Scholarship ==
Gordon received his doctorate in political theory from Oxford University in 2005. His dissertation formed the basis of his book Anarchy Alive! Anti-Authoritarian Politics from Practice to Theory, published by Pluto Press. Gordon has taught at British universities including Loughborough and Durham and at the Arava Institute for Environmental Studies in Ketura, a Kibbutz north of Eilat.

As of October 2024, his work has been cited in over 1,500 academic publications. Gordon is co-editor of the book series Contemporary Anarchist Studies at Manchester University Press. Besides his scholarly work, Gordon has contributed to Haaretz and The Jerusalem Post.

== Activism ==
Uri Gordon first became involved in the environmental movement, and now advocates for a new, heterogeneous, bioregional, feminist, and action-oriented grassroots anarchism. He considers anarchism to be an "ideology of survival." He further describes anarchism as prefigurative action by which adherents do not wait for major societal change to begin living according to their ideals of horizontal and cooperative relationships.

As a member of Anarchists Against the Wall, he has been a prominent member of the Israeli radical left, active in supporting Palestinian efforts to dismantle the "colonial infrastructure" of segregation barriers throughout the region. Recently, in a discussion with Mohammed Bamyeh on the "No State Solution," he has argued for "modes of a multicultural existence and even radical democracy that are not fundamentally opposed to religious practice or tradition, that are moving... towards equality."

== Selected publications ==
- Gordon, Uri. 2023. Leviathan's Body: Recovering Fredy Perlman's Anarchist Social Theory. Anarchist Studies 31.1. pp. 58–81
- Gordon, Uri. 2018. Prefigurative Politics between Ethical Practice and Absent Promise. Political Studies 66.2. pp. 521–537
- Gordon, Uri. 2018. Revolution. In Anarchism: A Conceptual Approach, eds. B. Franks, N. Jun, L. Williams. London: Routledge.
- Gordon, Uri. 2017. Democratic Deficit in Israel's 2011 Tent Protests: Chronicle of a failed intervention. In Protest Camps in International Context: Spaces, infrastructures and media of resistance, eds. G. Brown, A. Feigenbaum, F. Frenzel, P. McCurdy. Bristol: Policy Press. pp. 221–242
- Gordon, Uri, and Ohal Grietzer. 2013. Anarchists against the Wall : Direct Action and Solidarity with the Palestinian Popular Struggle. Edinburgh: AK Press.
- Gordon, Uri. 2008. Anarchy Alive! : Anti-Authoritarian Politics from Practice to Theory. London: Pluto Press.
