= Saul Newman =

British political theorist

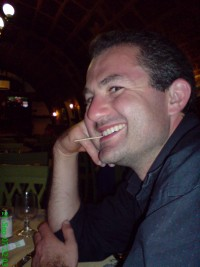
- Newman in 2009
- Born: 22 March 1972 (age 54)
- Education: University of Sydney; University of New South Wales
- Occupation: Professor of Political Theory
- Employer: Goldsmiths, University of London

Saul Newman (born 22 March 1972) is a British political theorist who writes on post-anarchism. He is professor of political theory at Goldsmiths College, University of London.

== Works ==
- From Bakunin to Lacan. Anti-Authoritarianism and the Dislocation of Power. Lanham MD: Lexington Books 2001
- Power and Politics in Poststructuralist Thought: New Theories of the Political. London: Routledge 2005
- Unstable Universalities: Postmodernity and Radical Politics. Manchester: Manchester University Press 2007
- Politics Most Unusual: Violence, Sovereignty and Democracy in the 'War on Terror'. (Co-authored with Michael Levine and Damian Cox). New York: Palgrave Macmillan 2009
- The Politics of Post Anarchism. Edinburgh: University of Edinburgh Press: 2010
- (ed.): Max Stirner. Houndmills, Basingstoke, Hampshire, UK; New York: Palgrave Macmillan 2011 ISBN 978-0-230-28335-0
- Postanarchism London: Polity 2015
- Political Theology: a Critical Introduction. London: Polity 2018
- Post-Truth Populism: a New Political Paradigm. Palgrave Macmillan 2024 - ISBN 9783031641770
