= The Anarchist Prince =

1950 biography of Peter Kropotkin by George Woodcock and Ivan Avakumović

- Author: George Woodcock and Ivan Avakumović
- Published: 1950 (Boardman Books)
- Pages: 463
- ISBN: 0805203052

The Anarchist Prince is a biography of Peter Kropotkin by George Woodcock and Ivan Avakumović.

== Publication ==
Avakumović co-authored the book as a student.

The book was republished in 1990 by Black Rose Books as Peter Kropotkin: From Prince to Rebel.

== Legacy ==
The Anarchist Prince was followed a quarter-century later by Martin A. Miller's Kropotkin, which was more scholarly and critical, by comparison, with a fuller bibliography.
