= Columbia Alternative Library =

American publishing house

The Columbia Alternative Library (CAL) is an American publishing house established in 1980 and based in Columbia, Missouri. Self-described as a "publishing collective dedicated to the utter destruction of the dominant society", its first published book was Anarchy after Leftism (1997) by Bob Black. CAL's imprints include C. A. L. Press, Paleo Editions, and Publishing Alternatives. Since 1980, the CAL has published Anarchy: A Journal of Desire Armed, an anarchist quarterly which consists of theory, alternative media reviews, and readers' letters.
