= Contemporary anarchism =

Present period of the anarchist movement

Contemporary anarchism within the history of anarchism is the period of the anarchist movement continuing from the end of World War II and into the present. Since the last third of the 20th century, anarchists have been involved in anti-globalisation, peace, squatter and student protest movements. Anarchists have participated in armed revolutions, such as in those that created the Makhnovshchina and Revolutionary Catalonia, and anarchist political organizations such as the International Workers' Association and the Industrial Workers of the World have existed since the 20th century. Within contemporary anarchism, the anti-capitalism of classical anarchism has remained prominent.

Anarchist principles undergird contemporary left-wing radical social movements. Interest in the anarchist movement developed alongside momentum in the anti-globalisation movement, whose leading activist networks were anarchist in orientation. As the movement shaped 21st century radicalism, wider embrace of anarchist principles signaled a revival of interest. Various anarchist groups, tendencies and schools of thought exist today, making it difficult to describe the contemporary anarchist movement. While theorists and activists have established "relatively stable constellations of anarchist principles", there is no consensus on which principles are core and commentators describe multiple "anarchisms" (rather than a singular "anarchism") in which common principles are shared between schools of anarchism while each group prioritizes those principles differently. Gender equality can be a common principle, although it ranks as a higher priority to anarcha-feminists than anarcho-communists.

New currents which emerged within contemporary anarchism include post-anarchism and post-left anarchism. New anarchism is a term used by several authors to describe the most recent reinvention of anarchist thought and practice. What distinguishes the new anarchism of today from the new anarchism of the 1960s and 1970s, or from the work of Anglo-American based authors such as Murray Bookchin, Alex Comfort, Paul Goodman, Herbert Read and Colin Ward, is its emphasis on the global perspective. Essays on new anarchism include David Graeber's "New Anarchists" and Andrej Grubačić's "Towards Another Anarchism"; other authors have criticized the term for being too vague.

Anarchists are generally committed against coercive authority in all forms, namely "all centralized and hierarchical forms of government (e.g., monarchy, representative democracy, state socialism, etc.), economic class systems (e.g., capitalism, Bolshevism, feudalism, slavery, etc.), autocratic religions (e.g., fundamentalist Islam, Roman Catholicism, etc.), patriarchy, heterosexism, racial supremacy, and imperialism." Anarchist schools disagree on the methods by which these forms should be opposed. The principle of equal liberty is closer to anarchist political ethics in that it transcends both the liberal and socialist traditions. This entails that liberty and equality cannot be implemented within the state, resulting in the questioning of all forms of domination and hierarchy. Contemporary news coverage which emphasizes black bloc demonstrations has reinforced anarchism's historical association with chaos and violence; however, its publicity has also led more scholars to engage with the anarchist movement, although contemporary anarchism favours actions over academic theory.

== History ==
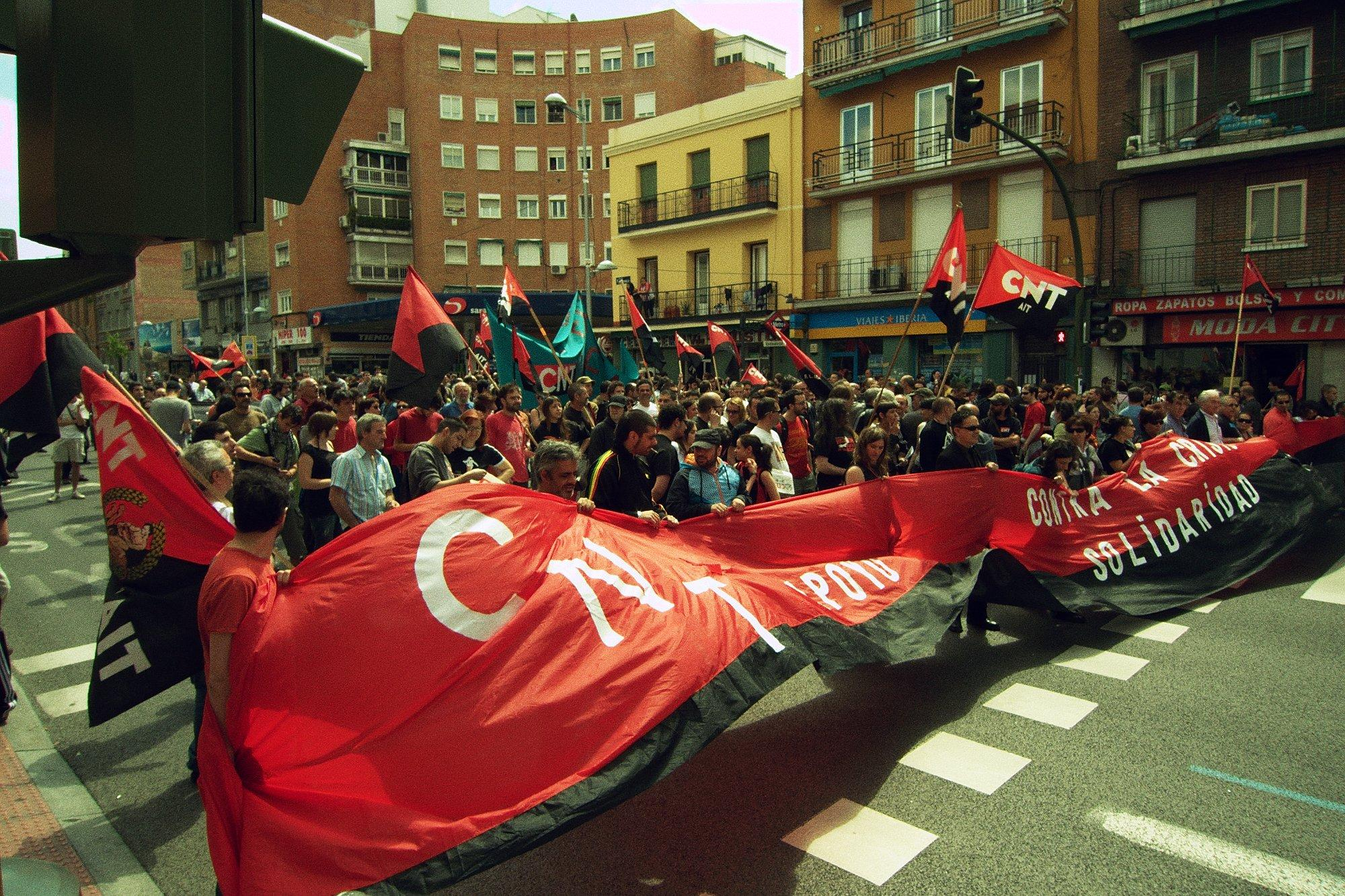
Members of the Spanish anarcho-syndicalist trade union CNT marching in Madrid in 2010

Anarchism was influential in the counterculture of the 1960s and anarchists actively participated in the protests of 1968 involving students and workers revolts. In 1968, the International of Anarchist Federations (IAF-IFA) was founded during an international anarchist conference held in Carrara by the three existing European federations, namely the French Anarchist Federation, the Iberian Anarchist Federation and the Italian Anarchist Federation as well as the Bulgarian Anarchist Federation in French exile. In the United Kingdom during the 1970s, this was associated with the punk rock movement as exemplified by bands such as Crass (pioneers of the anarcho-punk subgenre).

The housing and employment crisis in most of Western Europe led to the formation of communes, intentional communities and squatter movements like that of Barcelona. In Denmark, squatters occupied a disused military base and declared the Freetown Christiania, an autonomous haven in central Copenhagen. The relationship between anarchism and punk, as well as squatting, has carried on into the 21st century. In Infinitely Demanding, Simon Critchley wrote: "There is no doubt that 60s anarchism was libertarian and linked to the sexual revolution, liberation of the erotic instincts and what Herbert Marcuse called 'nonrepressive sublimation'. Yet, contemporary anarchism can be seen as a powerful critique of the pseudo-libertarianism of contemporary neo-liberalism, where the sexual revolution has turned the culture industry into the sex industry – ask yourself, is there today anything less transgressive and more normalizing than pornography? One might say that contemporary anarchism is about responsibility, whether sexual, ecological or socio-economic; it flows from an experience of conscience about the manifold ways in which the West ravages the rest; it is an ethical outrage at the yawning inequality, impoverishment and disenfranchisment that is so palpable locally and globally."

Since the revival of anarchism in the mid-20th century, a number of new movements and schools of thought emerged, well documented in Robert Graham's Anarchism: A Documentary History of Libertarian Ideas, Volume Two: The Emergence of the New Anarchism (1939–1977). Although feminist tendencies have always been a part of the anarchist movement in the form of anarcha-feminism, they returned with vigour during the second wave of feminism in the 1960s. The American civil rights movement and the movement in opposition to the Vietnam War also contributed to the revival of North American anarchism. European anarchism of the late 20th century drew much of its strength from the labour movement, and both have incorporated animal rights activism. Anarchist anthropologist David Graeber and anarchist historian Andrej Grubačić have posited a rupture between generations of anarchism, with those "who often still have not shaken the sectarian habits" of the 19th century contrasted with the younger activists who are "much more informed, among other elements, by indigenous, feminist, ecological and cultural-critical ideas" and who by the turn of the 21st century formed "by far the majority" of anarchists.

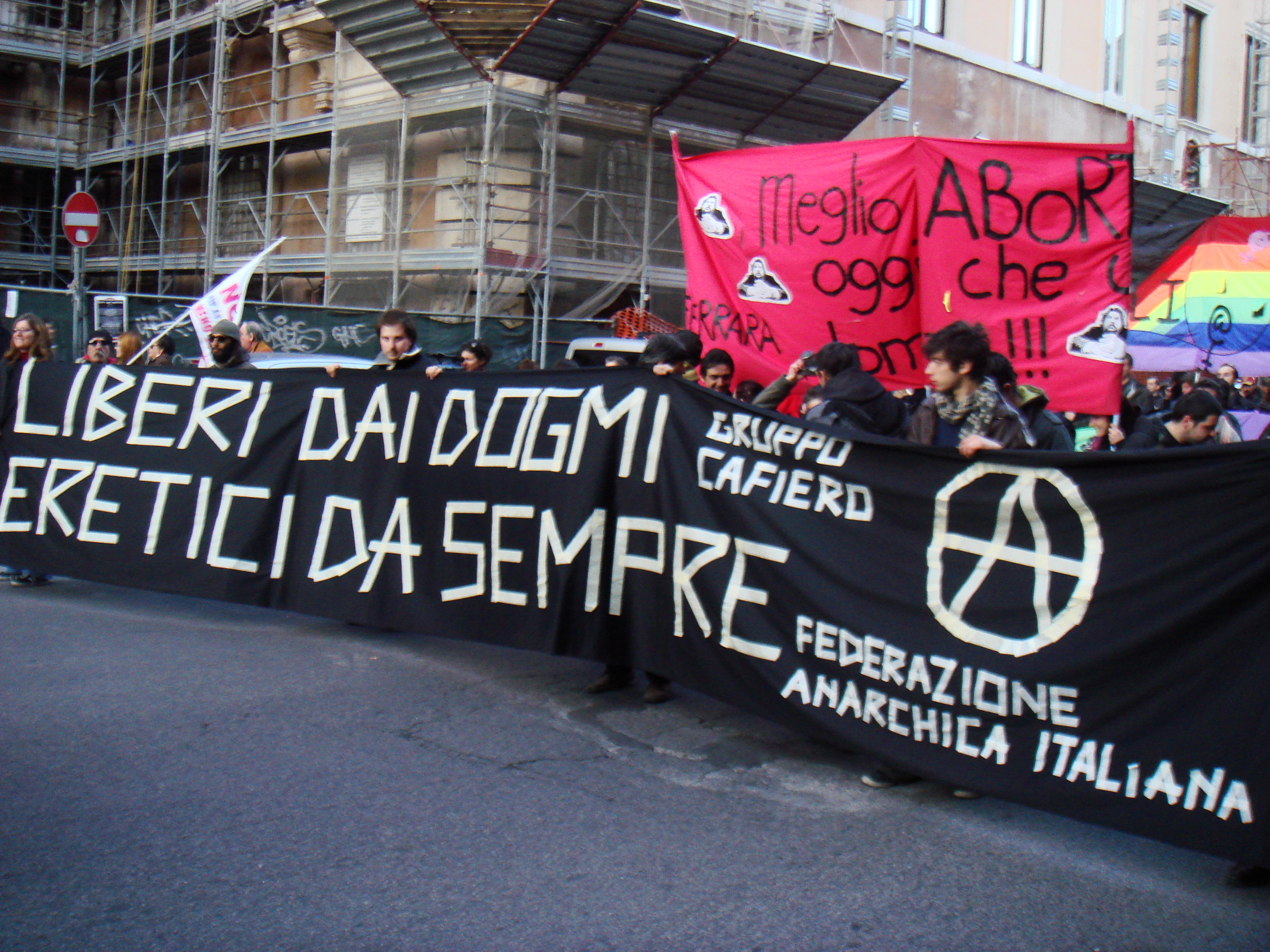
Contemporary members of the Italian Anarchist Federation marching in Rome in 2008 in an anti-Catholic manifestation (the text translates as "free from dogmas, always heretics")

Around the turn of the 21st century, anarchism grew in popularity and influence as part of the anti-war, anti-capitalist and anti-globalisation movements. Anarchists became known for their involvement in protests against the meetings of the World Trade Organization (WTO), the Group of Eight and the World Economic Forum. Some anarchist factions at these protests engaged in rioting, property destruction and violent confrontations with police. These actions were precipitated by ad hoc, leaderless and anonymous cadres known as black blocs, although other peaceful organisational tactics pioneered in this time include affinity groups, security culture and the use of decentralised technologies such as the Internet. A significant event of this period was the 1999 Seattle WTO protests. Many commentators have stated that the Occupy Wall Street movement has roots in anarchist philosophy.

International anarchist federations in existence include the International of Anarchist Federations and the International Workers' Association. The largest organised anarchist movement today is in Spain, in the form of the CGT and the CNT, with the CGT membership being estimated at around 100,000 in 2003. Other active anarcho-syndicalist movements include the CNT–AIT in France, the Union Sindicale Italiana in Italy, the Central Organisation of the Workers of Sweden and the Swedish Anarcho-syndicalist Youth Federation in Sweden, the Workers Solidarity Alliance in the United States and the Solidarity Federation in the United Kingdom. The revolutionary industrial unionist Industrial Workers of the World, claiming 10,000 paying members and the International Workers' Association, an anarcho-syndicalist successor to the First International, also remain active. The International of Anarchist Federations was founded in 1968 during an international anarchist conference in Carrara by the three existing European anarchist federations of France, Italy, and Spain, as well as the Bulgarian Anarchist Federation in French exile. These organizations were also inspired by synthesis anarchist principles. Currently, alongside the previously mentioned federations, the International of Anarchist Federations includes the Argentine Libertarian Federation, the Anarchist Federation of Belarus, the Czech-Slovak Anarchist Federation, the Federation of German-speaking Anarchists in Germany and Switzerland, and the Anarchist Federation in the United Kingdom and Ireland.

Platformism is an important current in international anarchism. Around thirty platformist and specifist organizations are linked together in the Anarkismo project, including groups from Africa, Europe, Latin America and North America. At least in terms of the number of affiliated organisations, the Anarkismo network is larger than other anarchist international bodies such as the International of Anarchist Federations and the International Workers' Association. However, it is not a formal international and has no intention of competing with these other formations. Today, there are organisations inspired by Delo truda's Organizational Platform of the General Union of Anarchists (Draft) in many countries, including Federación Anarco-Comunista de Argentina and Línea Anarco-Comunista in Argentina, the Melbourne Anarchist Communist Group and Sydney Anarchist Communist Trajectory in Australia, Fórum do Anarquismo Organizado in Brazil, Common Cause (Ontario) and Union Communiste Libertaire (Quebec) in Canada, Federación Comunista Libertaria and Organización Comunista Libertaria (OCL) in Chile, Alternative Libertaire and Organisation Communiste Libertaire in France, Federazione dei Comunisti Anarchici in Italy, Alianza de los Comunistas Libertarios in Mexico, Motmakt in Norway, Unión Socialista Libertaria in Peru, the Zabalaza Anarchist Communist Front in South Africa, Collective Action in the United Kingdom, Common Struggle/Lucha Común in the United States and the Revolutionary Confederation of Anarcho-Syndicalists by the name of N. I. Makhno which is an international anarcho-syndicalist and platformist confederation with sections and individual members in Bulgaria, Georgia, Germany, Israel, Latvia, Russia and Ukraine. Organisations inspired by platformism were also among the founders of the now-defunct International Libertarian Solidarity network, and its successor Anarkismo network, which is run collaboratively by roughly thirty platformist and specifists organisations around the world.

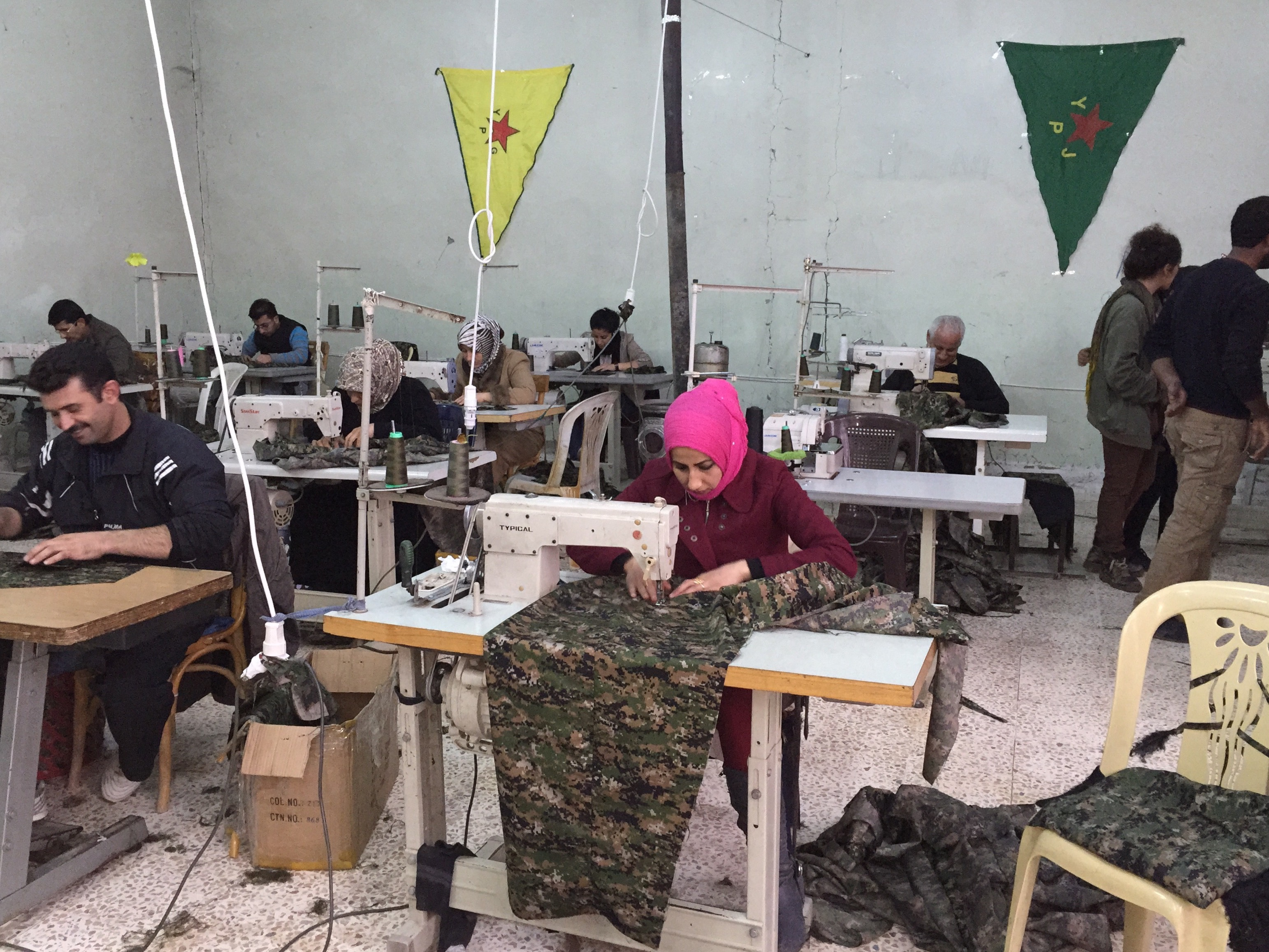
Rojava is supporting efforts for workers to form cooperatives such as this sewing cooperative

Anarchist ideas have been influential in the development of the Democratic Federation of Northern Syria, more commonly known as Rojava, a de facto autonomous region in northern Syria. Abdullah Öcalan, a founding member of the Kurdistan Workers' Party who is currently imprisoned in Turkey, is an iconic and popular figure in Rojava and whose ideas shaped the region's society and politics.

While in prison, Öcalan corresponded with and was influenced by Murray Bookchin, a social anarchist theorist and philosopher who developed communalism and libertarian municipalism. Modelled after Bookchin's ideas, Öcalan developed the theory of democratic confederalism. In March 2005, Öcalan issued his "Declaration of Democratic Confederalism in Kurdistan", calling upon citizens "to stop attacking the government and instead create municipal assemblies, which he called 'democracy without the state'".

Noam Chomsky stated that anarcho-syndicalism, a classical anarchist school of thought that remains popular and relevant to contemporary anarchism, is "highly relevant to advanced industrial societies". Anarchism continues to generate many philosophies and movements, at times eclectic, drawing upon various sources and syncretic, combining disparate concepts to create new philosophical approaches.

== Currents ==
=== New anarchism ===
Self-avowed anarchist scholars such as David Graeber and Andrej Grubačić have written on trends within contemporary anarchism both individually and in collaboration. Writing together, their emphasis is upon a "global revolutionary movement" finding roots in anarchism as opposed to Marxism, and a new generation "much more interested in developing new forms of practice than arguing about the finer points of ideology." Using the phrase "the new anarchists", Graeber elaborates upon practice with regard to globalization, "a 'new language' of civil disobedience", direct democracy, and prefigurative politics. Using the phrase another anarchism, Grubačić situates contemporary anarchism in terms of its historical roots, and emphasizes its "anti-sectarian" nature, rejection of vanguardism, internationalism, decentralization, and direct democracy. Using the phrase new anarchism, political scientist Leonard Williams seeks out an "anarchist metaphysic" of contemporary anarchism and emphasizes its anti-authoritarianism, pluralism, and its "theory of practice." While stipulating a use of the phrase new anarchism that does "not specifically refer to David Graeber's use of the term here in his New Left Review article 'The New Anarchists'", Teoman Gee decries the associations of the phrase with anarchist practices that are anti-historical, polemical, or associated with superficial lifestyle anarchism.

=== Post-anarchism ===
Post-anarchism is a revision of classical anarchism sometimes through the influence of post-structuralists such as Jean Baudrillard, Gilles Deleuze, Michel Foucault, and Jacques Lacan. Post-anarchism is a contested term, with its prefix "post-" referring to post-structuralism and/or postmodernism, which themselves are contested terms. Many post-anarchist theorists (e.g., Jason Adams, Todd May, and Saul Newman) invoke post-structuralist writings. The postmodern aspect of post-anarchism involves rejection of universal values and grand theories in favor of plurality and hybridity. Philosopher Benjamin Franks identified three types of post-anarchism: (1) Lyotardian postanarchism, which proposes replacing classical anarchist (revolutionary) tactics with those of post-structuralists; (2) redemptive postanarchism, to incorporate post-structural theory into existing anarchist practices; and (3) postmodern anarchism, which applies anarchist approaches to globalized oppressions of the late 21st century. Critics of post-anarchism argue that it ignores principles of class warfare and economic exploitation, not producing political action. Duane Rousselle and Saul Newman have advanced a psychoanalytic post-anarchism inspired by the writings of Jacques Lacan. Duane Rousselle's work brings together thinking from the Lacanianism of Jacques Lacan and Slavoj Žižek to outline a distinctive approach that takes seriously the political challenges of enjoyment or jouissance.

=== Post-left anarchism ===
Post-left anarchist thought critiques anarchism's relationship to traditional left-wing politics, such as its emphasis on class struggle, social revolution, labor unions, the working class, and identity politics. Influenced by anti-authoritarian postmodern philosophy, post-leftists reject Enlightenment rationalism and modernism and deconstruct topics such as gender. While a few advocate for armed insurrection, most advocate for creating spaces and affinity groups to act freely within current society rather than fighting for a utopian ideal. In the United States, CrimethInc., Anarchy: A Journal of Desire Armed, and Green Anarchy are associated with post-leftism, as are many primitivists. CrimethInc, which is influenced by situationist theory, anarcho-punk, and green anarchy, argues for a DIY folk approach to everyday life, including refusal of work, escaping gender roles, and straight edge lifestyle.

=== Postcolonial anarchism ===
Postcolonial anarchism critiques mainstream anarchism for minimizing race and the role of anticolonial liberation struggle. It connects anarchism and other anti-authoritarian movements, such as that of indigenous and landless peoples. The theoretical framework emerged from North American anarchists of color in the 1990s. In the work of Roger White, it is associated with opposing universal generalizations about the role of nationalism, class, and feminism in anarchism.

== Writing ==
Prominent anarchist presses include AK Press and Freedom Press. AK Press, founded in 1990, is a collective based in San Francisco that publishes new and out-of-print works. Freedom Press, founded in 1886, is based in East London and operates a bookshop and online news in addition to publishing.

Contemporary anarchist periodicals include Fifth Estate, Perspectives on Anarchist Theory, and Green Anarchy.

The Institute for Anarchist Studies offers grants for writing and translating works related to anarchism.

== See also ==
- Anarchism and the Occupy movement
- Anarchist schools of thought

== Bibliography ==
- Finnell, Joshua; Marcantel, Jerome (2010). "Understanding resistance: An introduction to anarchism". College & Research Libraries News. 71 (3): 156–159. doi:10.5860/crln.71.3.8341. ISSN 2150-6698.
- Franks, Benjamin (June 2007). "Postanarchism: A critical assessment" (PDF). Journal of Political Ideologies. 12 (2). Routledge: 127–145. doi:10.1080/13569310701284985. ISSN 1356-9317. S2CID 144787193.
- Kinna, Ruth, ed. (2012). The Continuum Companion to Anarchism. Continuum Companions. Bloomsbury Academic. ISBN 978-1-4411-7212-9.
- Levy, Carl; Adams, Matthew S., eds. (2018). The Palgrave Handbook of Anarchism. Palgrave Macmillan. ISBN 978-3-319-75619-6.
