= Sophie Kropotkin =

Ukrainian educator and writer (1856–1941)

Princess Sophie Kropotkin
- Софія Кропоткіна
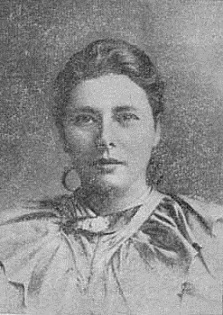
- Kropotkin (c. 1880)
- Born: Sofia Grigorievna Ananieva-Rabinovich; 1856; Kiev, Russian Empire
- Died: 1941 (aged 84–85); Moscow, Soviet Union
- Resting place: Novodevichy Cemetery
- Education: University of Bern
- Occupations: Educator; lecturer; writer
- Organization: Kropotkin Museum
- Spouse: Peter Kropotkin (m. 1878; died 1921)
- Children: Alexandra Kropotkin

Sofia Grigorievna Kropotkina (née Ananieva-Rabinovich; 1856–1941), commonly known by her anglicised name Sophie Kropotkin, was a Ukrainian teacher, writer, lecturer and museum director. Born into a Ukrainian Jewish family, she grew up in Tomsk, where her father ran a gold mine. After coming of age, she moved to Switzerland, where she pursued a degree in biology at the University of Bern and met Peter Kropotkin, whom she married. When her husband was arrested and imprisoned by the French government, she actively campaigned for his release, drawing sympathy from much of the Western press. She then moved to the United Kingdom, where she took up a career in teaching and went on lecture tours of the country, discussing the political issues of the Russian Empire and its revolutionary movement. After the Russian Revolution, she and her family moved to Moscow, where her husband died in 1921. She worked as the director of a museum about his life and work, which she managed up until her death.

== Biography ==
=== Early life and education ===
Sofia Grigorievna Ananieva-Rabinovich was born in 1856, in Kiev, to a well-off Jewish family. When Sofia was five years old, the family moved to Tomsk, Siberia, where her father operated a gold mine. There she received an education, paid for by her father. She left home at the age of seventeen, determined to support herself as a member of the working class, as she refused to continuing living off the labour of the miners, who endured poor living and working conditions. After a few years of this, some of her friends, distressed at the subsequent deterioration of her health, banded together to send her abroad to Switzerland so that she could rest.

In May 1878, she met the anarchist communist theorist Peter Kropotkin at a cafe in Geneva; the two married on 8 October 1878. Although Kropotkin was almost twice her age, the marriage was a happy one. Sofia greatly admired her husband and remained devoted to him throughout their life together and to his memory after his death. According to Polish revolutionary Solomon Mendelsohn, she also took a certain pleasure in having attained the noble rank of Princess, which was conferred by the marriage. By this time she had decided to pursue a higher education, but the University of Geneva refused admittance to foreign students without a school diploma. She instead enrolled at the University of Bern, where she began studying biology. She and her new husband lived apart during this time, as he stayed behind in Geneva, but they were able to see each other irregularly as her studies permitted.

In 1880, she moved back to Geneva, but exposure to the city's cold, windy weather caused her health to deteriorate again. On the advice of her doctors, she and her husband then moved to Clarens, which was more sheltered from the elements, and where they stayed with Élisée Reclus. Following the assassination of Alexander II of Russia in 1881, the Kropotkin couple volunteered to work for the revolutionary terrorist group Narodnaya Volya, but they were dissuaded by Sergey Stepnyak-Kravchinsky. On 23 August of that year, the Russian government demanded that Peter Kropotkin be expelled from Switzerland. Despite their comrades' protests against the expulsion order, by the following week, the couple left Switzerland for France. As Sophie herself had not yet finished her Bachelor of Science degree, they settled in Thonon-les-Bains, so that she could travel back to Bern and finish her studies. After two months, in November 1881, the two moved to the United Kingdom, settling in the London borough of Islington.

Within the space of a year, the two became exhausted by the social isolation they experienced in the city and frustrated by what they considered the apathy of local British activists towards the events in Russia. Despite the risk of her husband's arrest, they decided to move back to France, concluding that even a French prison would be better than life in England: on 26 October 1882, they returned to their house in Thonon. There they were joined by one of Sophie's brothers, who was dying from tuberculosis. The Kropotkins were under constant police surveillance and their house was searched by gendarmes, who on one occasion forcibly threw Sophie's dying brother out of his bed. On 21 December 1882, hours after Sophie's brother died, Peter Kropotkin was arrested by the French police. Kropotkin requested that he be allowed to remain with Sophie until after her brother's funeral, but the police denied his request and took him to be tried and sentenced in Lyon. Having heard the news of this, Élisée Reclus came from Switzerland to be with Sophie at her brother's funeral, which was also attended by many local peasants.

=== Campaign against husband's imprisonment ===
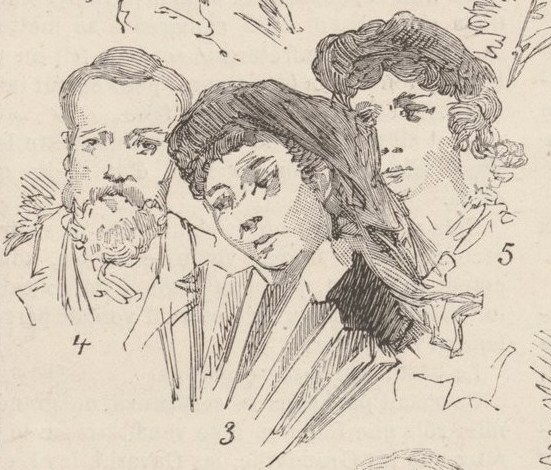
Kropotkin (3), her sister (5) and the secretary of the prince during the trial of the 66 in Le Monde illustré

After the trial of the 66, Sophie's husband was imprisoned in Clairvaux Prison. Sophie frequently visited him in prison, where she brought him books supplied by the French Academy of Sciences and Ernest Renan. In 1883, Sophie moved to Paris in order to complete her studies to become a Doctor of Science, staying with Élie Reclus. At this time, she also suggested to Élisée Reclus that Jean Grave be made editor-in-chief of Kropotkin's journal Le Révolté; on her advice, Grave took up the post later that year. After her husband fell ill with malaria, which was endemic in the prison, she moved to Ville-sous-la-Ferté, where she stayed until his release. She was initially only permitted to see him once every two months, but she insisted on seeing him more regularly, and was eventually permitted to see him every day.

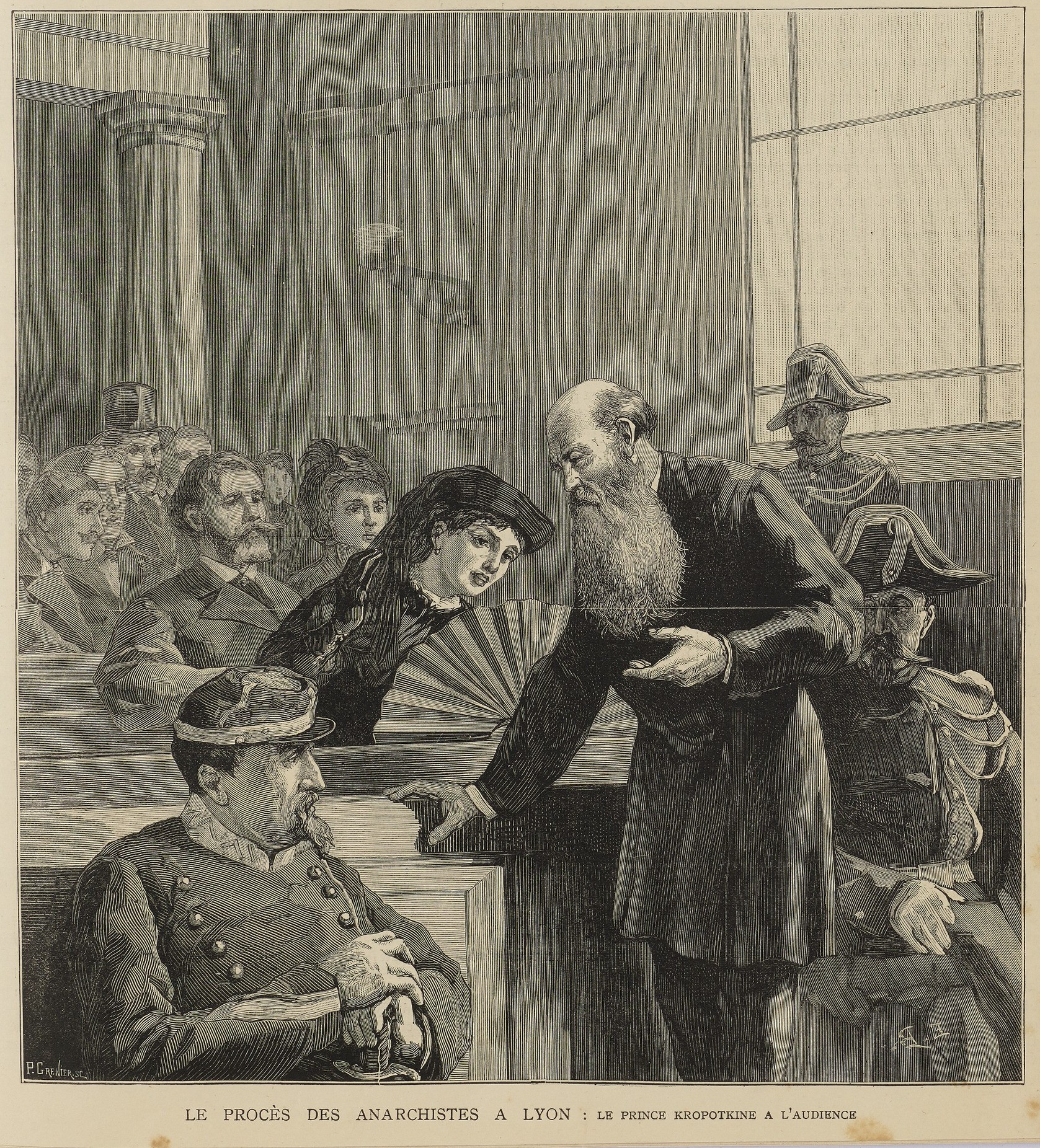
Sophie speaking to Peter during the trial of the 66 in L'Illustration of 27 January 1883

Sophie immediately began campaigning for her husband's release. She wrote to The Boston Globe, alleging that the French Republic's anti-communist laws had enabled him to be convicted without any evidence, and that it had been motivated by a desire to appease the Tsarist autocracy. She quipped that France "is a republic; yes, but a republic so afraid that it panders to a despot. Republic, bah." Sophie herself successfully generated widespread sympathy for her husband's treatment by the French state, with one correspondent for the Evening Telegraph depicting her as a "heroic" figure, suffering through her husband's imprisonment, who deserved sympathy and respect. During the entire length of Kropotkin's imprisonment, Sophie played a leading role in popularising anti-Tsarist sentiment in the West. In 1886, her story "The Wife of Number 4,237", a serialised work of autobiographical fiction about her experiences, was published in Liberty by Benjamin Tucker.

By January 1886, the campaign for her husband's release had grown so large that Jules Grévy's government was forced to grant it. Reunited with her husband, Sophie returned to Paris with him, and again lodged with Élie Reclus. Although financially destitute, they were able to earn enough money for themselves through the publication of Sophie's "Wife of Number 4,237" and her husband's own prison memoir The Nineteenth Century.

=== Life in Britain ===
That same year, Sophie moved to the United Kingdom, after Charlotte Wilson secured her a career as a teacher and public speaker. Her husband soon joined them in London, where he participated in the publication of Wilson's newspaper Freedom. The couple moved in with Sergey Stepniak, who had a house in St John's Wood. By April 1886, they had found a house for themselves in Harrow, where they found enjoyment cultivating their small garden.

Within a few weeks of their move, Sophie fell ill with typhoid, which was reported by a number of sympathetic British newspapers. Her husband wrote to Victor Dave that time in their garden had helped her recovery, reporting that it had been "more completely restorative than a stay in the very best sanatorium". In late 1886, after her brother-in-law Alexander Kropotkin committed suicide in his Siberian exile, Sophie took care of his sick and grieving widow, who managed to recover under her care. In April 1887, Sophie gave birth to her daughter, Alexandra Kropotkin, who was named after Sophie's deceased brother-in-law.

As the Kropotkins resumed their political activities in London, they remained fearful of surveillance and infiltration by Russian spies and agents provocateurs, with Sophie screening any strangers before they met her husband. On one occasion, when a French journalist from the newspaper Le Figaro showed up at their house requesting an interview, Sophie slammed the door in his face. In 1894, they moved to Bromley, where they regularly hosted friends for Sunday afternoon tea. Friends of the family recalled how Sophie would often need to double the amount of food she was making, as more visitors dropped by unannounced.

When a public meeting was held in Spitalfields in March 1897, in protest against the political repression of Spanish anarchists in the Montjuïc trials, Sophie made her public speaking debut, with a lecture about the contemporary Russian women's movement. Assisted by Charlotte Wilson, she became a popular public speaker, lecturing in Surrey and Greater London on the subjects of chemistry and botany; she also wrote a number of scientific articles for The Contemporary Review. Many people attended her public lectures, in which she discussed the political situation in the Russian Empire, and the British press routinely invoked her title of "Princess". When she visited Dundee on a lecture tour, the Evening Telegraph wrote of her and other Russian revolutionary women being "selected for the most difficult and dangerous tasks." Unlike her husband, she was never depicted as a terrorist by the Anglophone press.

At the turn of the 20th century, as her husband fell seriously ill due to overwork, she took to preventing him from further damaging his health, even to such an extent that she would cut him off mid-sentence if she saw him getting too worked up about something. On one occasion, Ford Madox Ford remarked that during an argument he had with Peter, "suddenly the Princess would descend upon him when he had thought out something really crushing to say, but before he had had time to formulate it. She would drape his plaid about him, he would be led off, spitting fiery sentences at me over his shoulder." In December 1901, her husband reported that his heart had stopped and directed Sophie and her daughter to perform cardiopulmonary resuscitation. The following year, Sophie advised her husband to leave England, go south and recover in a warmer climate.

As Peter believed his illness was to be fatal, he insisted that he spend his last years with his family, but his constitution would prove stronger than he anticipated, allowing him to return to his travels. In the summer of 1907, Sophie and her husband travelled to Paris, where they met Emma Goldman, who had arrived from North America to attend the International Anarchist Congress of Amsterdam. In 1910, the Kropotkin family travelled to Italy, where they stayed for a time in Rapallo. They again took a trip to Italy in the summer of 1914, the last of such journeys before the outbreak of World War I. Sophie and Peter Kropotkin both expressed their support for the Allied Powers, with Sophie even denouncing those that refused to support the Allied cause for cowardice. Sophie represented her husband in calls for Freedom to be suspended during the war, but the newspaper carried on without them, propagating an anti-war line. She continued to care for her ailing husband throughout the war, while also giving lectures on various subjects, including the prohibition of alcohol in Russia.

=== Return to Russia ===
By the time that their daughter came of age, the Kropotkins had attempted to send her to Russia, but the Tsarist government considered children of Russian citizens born in Britain to be stateless and denied them entry to the country. After the outbreak of the Russian Revolution in 1917, Sophie and Peter finally moved back to Russia. Upon their arrival in Petrograd, they were greeted by a cheering crowd, which almost crushed them in the excitement. Rescued by guards, they subsequently met Alexander Kerensky, Matvey Skobelev and Nikolai Tchaikovsky, as well as various socialist and anarchist representatives. They were also reunited with their daughter, who had moved to Russia during the war. The family quickly left Petrograd, finding urban life too stressful, and briefly moved to a dacha in the Kamenny Islands. In August 1917, they moved to an apartment in Moscow, where they stayed over the winter. Sophie and her husband lived together in centrally-heated rooms, and following the October Revolution, their flatmates helped her sustain the family by taking her place in breadlines. The two were distressed by the first news of the Red Terror, although Sophie, who appeared to her friends even weaker than her sick husband, was more anxious to find out what had happened to Alexandra.

In June 1918, they moved to the village of Dmitrov, in a more rural part of the Moscow region. Having refused an offer from the Soviet government to buy the rights to publishing Peter's literature, the family lived by modest means, together in a single poorly-heated room. Without telling her husband, who she knew would reject it, Sophie accepted an offer from the People's Commissariat for Education for an academic stipend, which she received for her work as a botanist. A local agricultural cooperative supplied them with a dairy cow and Sophie cultivated a small vegetable garden, which she took great pride in. On one occasion, she grew a surplus of potatoes, part of which she exchanged for animal feed, and the rest of which she gave to her neighbours. In December 1918, a local union invited Sophie and her husband to attend a meeting as guests of honour. Rural life brought a marked improvement to Sophie's health. In one of Peter's last letters, which he sent to Turin in June 1920, he remarked that Sophie had not aged, reporting that she stayed alert and kept herself busy gardening and haymaking. That same month, the British trade unionist Margaret Bondfield reported that she "seemed tired, but, otherwise, better than I had expected to find her". Although towards the end of 1920, her husband had become more optimistic about the prospects of the Russian Revolution, Sophie had herself become more pessimistic, due to widespread food shortages and worsening living conditions. In November 1920, Sophie and Alexandra encouraged Peter to make a public statement about what he thought Russian anarchists ought to do in the present circumstances. Although this caused him great agitation, manifesting in nearly illegible handwriting, his work on this culminated with the publication "What to do?", which he intended to distribute to close friends but not to publish.

=== Work for the Kropotkin museum ===
By the beginning of 1921, Peter Kropotkin fell gravely ill with pneumonia. He was attended to by his personal physician, Alexander Atabekian, while Sophie and Alexandra stayed by his side. Sophie's husband died on 8 February 1921. Sophie declined the Bolshevik government's offer to hold a state funeral and instead established an anarchist committee to organise it themselves; the funeral attracted 20,000 attendees. In April 1921, Sophie received a letter from Mabel Grave, who declared that: "It is my ambition to be to Jean the same sort of wife as you have been to Pierre – your example, the thought of that happy home you made for him, the atmosphere in which he could do his work, will always be an incentive to me to try to do likewise."

Kropotkin's house in Moscow was turned over to Sophie, who oversaw its transformation into a museum about his life and work. Other members of the museum's committee included anarchist scholars such as Alexander Atabekian, Aleksei Solonovich and Nikolai Lebedev. Despite disputes with the Soviet government, whose state ideology clashed with Kropotkin's libertarian political theory, Sophie managed to keep the museum open throughout the 1920s and most of the 1930s, up until her death. As the museum's honorary director, she dedicated herself to translating her husband's writings into Russian. During this period, she returned to Western Europe twice: in 1923 and again in 1929.

By 1928, Sophie reported in a letter to Max Nettlau that the museum committee had fallen into factional infighting, as different groups that had not participated in the museum's construction sought to take over its management. She wrote that "I hope that none of them will be masters while I am alive, and some thing will have to be done to secure the safety of the Museum when I am no more there." During the Great Purge, many of the committee's original members were arrested and deported. The museum was shut down by the government in 1938. Sophie Kropotkin herself died in 1941 and her body was buried in the Novodevichy Cemetery in Moscow.

== Selected works ==
- Kropotkin, Sophie (1886). "The Wife of Number 4,237". Liberty. 3–4. Translated by Holmes, Sarah E.
- Kropotkin, Sophie (17 August 1893). "Numerous Insects Washed up by the Sea". Nature. 48 (1242): 370. Bibcode:1893Natur..48R.370K. doi:10.1038/048370e0.
- Kropotkin, Sophie (January 1898). "The Higher Education of Women in Russia". The Nineteenth Century. 43 (251): 117–134.
- Kropotkin, Sophie (1902). "A Russian Village". Northern Europe. Youth's Companion Series. Boston: Ginn & Co. pp. 109–122.
- Kropotkin, Sophie (January 1904). "Lending Libraries and Cheap Books". The Nineteenth Century. 55 (323): 69–78.
- Kropotkin, Sophie (3 April 1908). "News of the Religious Schools: New York City". Young Israel. 1 (19): 601.
- Kropotkin, Sophie (July 1915). "Intensive Farming in Flanders". The Contemporary Review. 108 (595): 105–112.

== Bibliography ==
- Avrich, Paul (1971) [1967]. The Russian Anarchists. Princeton: Princeton University Press. ISBN 0-691-00766-7. OCLC 1154930946.
- Avrich, Paul (1988). "Kropotkin in America". Anarchist Portraits. Princeton University Press. pp. 79–106. ISBN 0-691-04753-7.
- Bantman, Constance (2021). Jean Grave and the Networks of French Anarchism, 1854-1939. Palgrave Studies in the History of Social Movements. Palgrave Macmillan. doi:10.1007/978-3-030-66618-7. ISBN 978-3-030-66617-0.
- Ferretti, Federico (2017). "Publishing anarchism: Pyotr Kropotkin and British print cultures, 1876–1917". Journal of Historical Geography. 57: 17–27. doi:10.1016/j.jhg.2017.04.006.
- Green, Lara (2022). "The Transnational Life and Death of Peter Kropotkin, 1881-1921: Terrorism, the Anarchist Body, and the Russian Revolution". Anarchist Studies. 30 (1): 83–119. doi:10.3898/AS.30.1.04. ISSN 2633-8270.
- Hinely, Susan (2012). "Charlotte Wilson, the "Woman Question", and the Meanings of Anarchist Socialism in Late Victorian Radicalism". International Review of Social History. 57 (1): 3–36. doi:10.1017/s0020859011000757.
- Osofsky, Stephen (1979). Peter Kropotkin. Boston: Twayne Publishers. ISBN 978-0-8057-7724-6. OCLC 4497420.
- Saytanov, Sergey V. (2021). "All-Russian Public Committee (Arpc) for Perpetuating the Memory of P. A. Kropotkin (APC): Achievements and Mistakes (Dedicated to the Committee's 100TH Anniversary)". Epohi (in Russian). 29 (1): 84–92. doi:10.54664/FQRP3015.
- Woodcock, George; Avakumović, Ivan (1990). Peter Kropotkin: From Prince to Rebel. Montreal: Black Rose Books. ISBN 0-921689-60-8. OCLC 21156316.
