= The Spirit of Revolt =

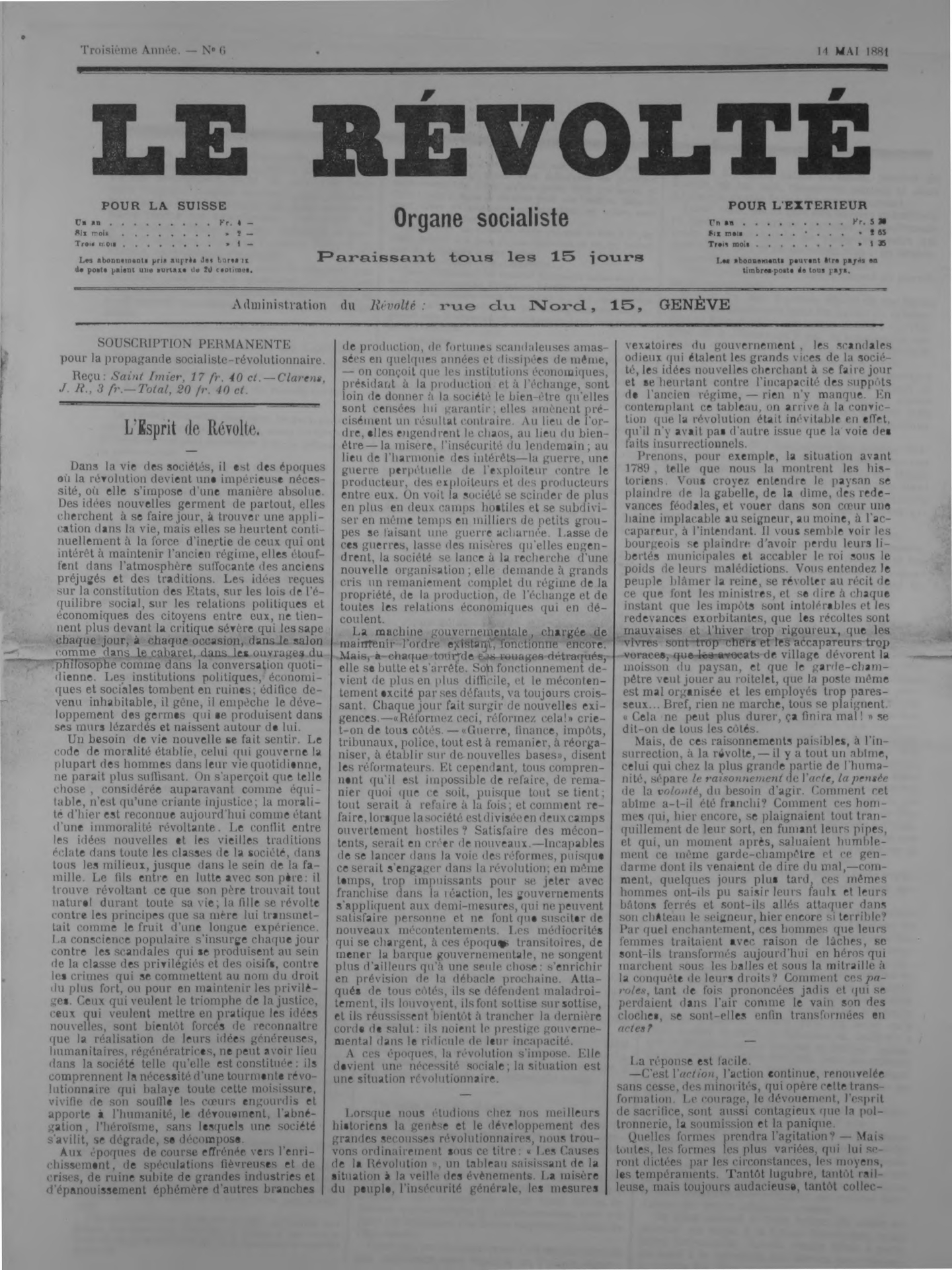
- First parts of The Spirit of Revolt in Le Révolté
- Author: Peter Kropotkin
- Genre: Political philosophy, history
- Publication date: 1881
- Publication place: Switzerland

The Spirit of Revolt (French: L'Esprit de Révolte) is an article and a pamphlet published by the Russian anarchist Peter Kropotkin in Le Révolté between May and June 1881. The philosopher wrote it during a period of tension and debate within the anarchist movement regarding propaganda by the deed, shortly before the London Congress (1881), which enshrined the use of this strategy and whose trajectory he failed to influence.

While the strategy was spreading within the movement, Kropotkin opposed it and developed, in this text, a different vision of anarchist action. Focusing on the question of transforming a pre-revolutionary situation into a revolution, he forged a new concept: the spirit of revolt. According to him, a plurality of revolutionary actions, both collective and individual, would be necessary to launch a revolution. He thus envisioned the launching, not of spectacular actions that were necessarily striking at a national or international level, but rather the increasing multiplication, by various anarchist groups and individuals, of revolutionary actions allowing the popular masses to radicalize and lead the anarchist social revolution. For its development, he took a great interest in the French Revolution (1789–1793), which is heavily discussed in the text; the Russian author also argued therein that the involvement of anarchists in such a direction would allow the movement to be favored by the people during the revolution, unlike other socialist currents.

The Spirit of Revolt was widely read within the anarchist movement; it is Kropotkin's second most-read pamphlet and was taken up by the first period of the Lyon anarchist press (1882–1884). Generally, however, its readers considered it a text supporting propaganda by the deed and falling within the same logic; this was not actually the case, although the text did not contradict it either. As for the Russian anarchist, he attached particular importance to this text and republished it in his Words of a Rebel.

== History ==
=== Context: Spread of propaganda of the deed and conflicts at the London Congress ===
The anarchist movement, founded around the Saint-Imier Congress in Switzerland in 1872, began to spread across Europe. The situation was complicated and repressive for the movement, with measures such as the Dufaure Law of 1872 in France, which banned the Anti-authoritarian International, the primary anarchist organization of that period. In this repressive context, anarchists progressively came to theorize and support the strategy of propaganda by the deed, which suggested acting directly to carry out an act of propaganda rather than waiting for speeches or writings to do so. This materialized through acts of insurrectionary revolt or assassinations targeting political or financial figures.

For his part, Peter Kropotkin, a major figure of the movement at the time and a primary theorist of the anarchist communist tendency, adopted an ambiguous stance toward this strategy. He preferred to develop his concept of the spirit of revolt: the idea that any revolution must be preceded by the generalization of a rebellious spirit, manifested through a diversity of revolutionary actions (whether violent or not). For him, the propaganda aspect of an action was not as central as it was for other theorists.

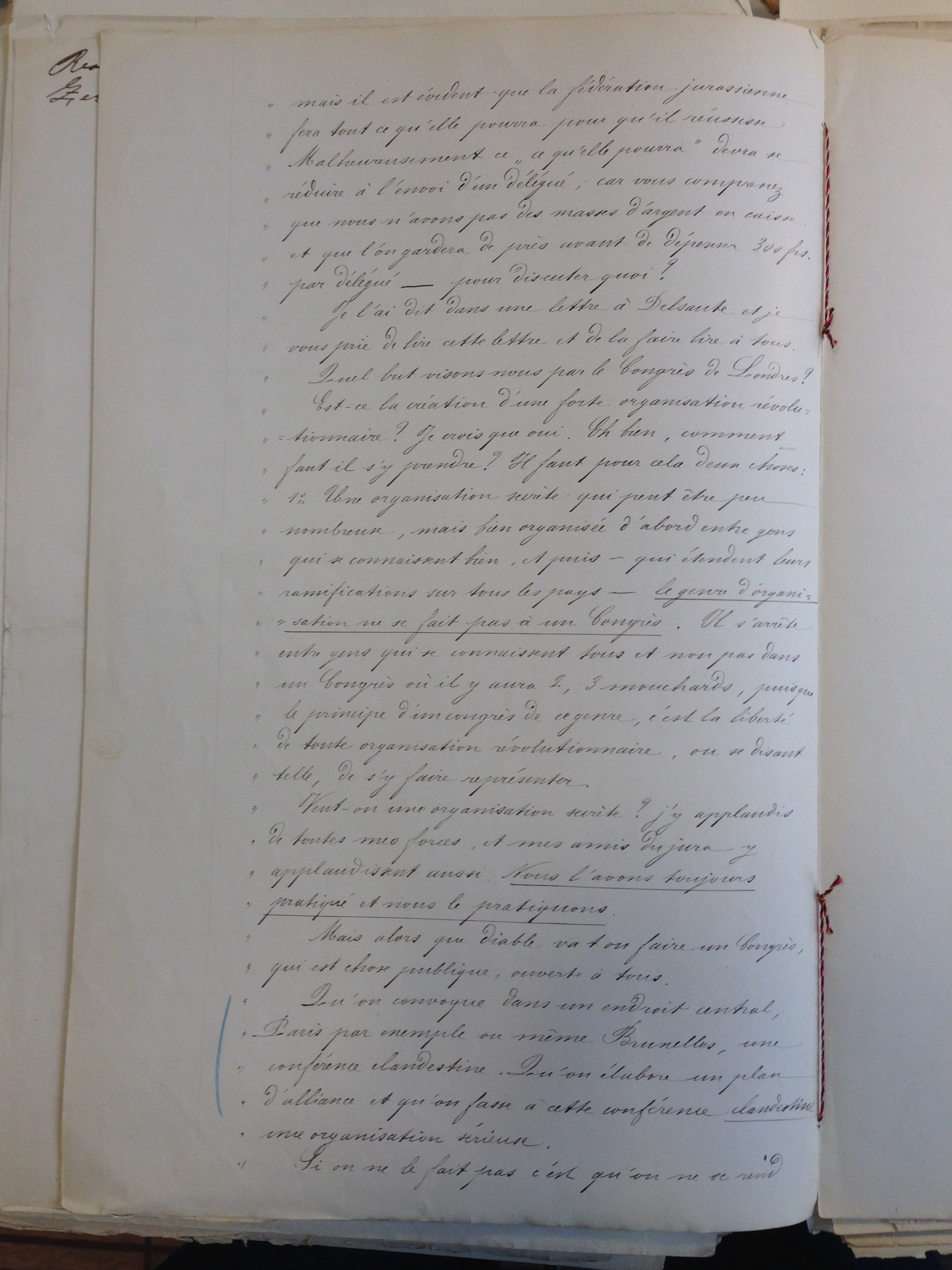
Parts of a letter by Kropotkin to Errico Malatesta about the London Congress, testifying to oppositions between the two (collections of Archives Anarchistes)

These differing visions among anarchists came to a head during the London Congress (1881). This congress, organized by socialists to recreate the First International, a program that already posed a problem for anarchists since the Anti-authoritarian International still existed, was initially viewed with suspicion, though they ultimately decided to participate. Several figures of the movement attended and supported a 'secret' International that adopted a program of propaganda by the deed as an evolution of the Anti-authoritarian International: this became known as the Black International.

Kropotkin attended and opposed this proposal; he preferred to maintain the International as a public, mass organization to which propaganda-by-the-deed groups could be attached, without making the entire organization secret. Conflicts arose between the Russian revolutionary and other figures of the movement, such as Louise Michel, Errico Malatesta, Victorine Rouchy, and Égide Spilleux (known as Serraux). They disagreed specifically on whether the International should support every revolutionary act, regardless of its moral value. While Kropotkin managed to somewhat temper the congress's tone, it ultimately adopted a program of propaganda by the deed and leaned toward the positions he had fought against.

According to Kropotkin, this 'defeat' within the congress pushed him, after having nonetheless voted for the final declaration, to publish his series of articles entitled The Spirit of Revolt to reaffirm his positions and give them a textual foundation. Regarding this, he wrote in two letters to George Herzig in 1909:

I have always been against this word and this idea of propaganda by deed and it is against this idea, which I have always found false, (you do not kill a man to make propaganda - you kill him because he is a viper and you hate him), that I wrote the articles L’Esprit de Révolte after the London Congress [...] And it was seeing the Serraux gang, at the Congress of London, make a weapon of it, that I wrote L’Esprit de Révolte.

Despite Kropotkin's later account, The Spirit of Revolt was actually published before the London Congress. Rather than a response to the congress, historian Caroline Cahm suggests it was likely a publication intended to strengthen his position for the upcoming congress.

== The Spirit of Revolt ==
Between May and June 1881, shortly before the congress, Kropotkin published four texts comprising the article in Le Révolté.

=== Content and theorization of the concept of the spirit of revolt ===
The text concerns the revolutionary strategies to be adopted; Kropotkin strongly supports both collective and individual revolutionary action. He describes and advocates for several forms of propaganda and action to be carried out, covering a variety of militant practices ranging from matters of public and clandestine propaganda to questions of organization.

The Russian revolutionary is particularly interested in the issue of pre-revolutionary situations in different countries; he describes how every revolution occurs when the social and economic situation makes it necessary, but that such a situation alone is not enough. Drawing on examples from several revolutions, but especially the French Revolution (1789–1793), he asserts that a revolution begins from the moment different groups and individuals, whom he calls the 'lost sentinels', transition the situation from theoretical to concrete through their actions, effectively materializing the revolution by 'launching' it. Kropotkin does not necessarily envision only collective actions, but individual ones as well.

Unlike propaganda by the deed, which maintains that specific actions can serve as propaganda inciting the people to revolt, the concept Kropotkin deploys, the spirit of revolt, does not take a definitive stance on that specific point. Instead, he focuses on demonstrating that action is the primary driving force of revolutions and that every revolutionary act within a pre-revolutionary situation allows subsequent revolutionary actions to follow, thereby triggering a growing cycle that leads to the anarchist social revolution.

Ultimately, although his theory runs parallel to that of propaganda by the deed, his concept is broader and can encompass both legal and illegal actions. For him, it is more about placing the masses in a psychological state that drives them toward revolution rather than carrying out specific actions against a particular king or financial figure.

The revolutionary appears to weave a vast network of actions; he maintains that whether they are individual or collective, they are linked by their march toward revolution. Furthermore, he argues that the involvement of anarchists in this struggle would be decisive because, at the moment of revolution, the 'party' that had led these multiple actions would logically be the one the masses favor, while they would ignore reformist socialist currents.

== Legacy ==
=== Reception within the anarchist movement ===
The text, although distinct from propaganda by the deed, was often understood by its readers as referring to it, which was contrary to the author's intention; nevertheless, it was widely shared and read by anarchists. Thus, the titles of the first period of the Lyon anarchist press (1882–1884) reprinted his text, testifying to its definite success. It remains Kropotkin's second most-read pamphlet after To the Young and became solidified in the cultural memory of the movement, the Russian revolutionary himself attached great importance to it and republished it in his Words of a Rebel.

In general, propaganda by the deed established itself as one of the movement's preferred strategies over the following decades, as manifested by Kropotkin's defeat at the London Congress, while the concept of the spirit of revolt did not acquire the same influence or prestige. That said, Kropotkin never dissociated himself from acts of propaganda by the deed, which he often considered to fall under the category of the spirit of revolt.

=== Original ===
- Original versions in Le Révolté on Archives Autonomies
- Version published in Words of a Rebel on Wikisource

=== Translations in English ===
- 2009 translation on The Anarchist Library

== Bibliography ==
- Baker, Zoe (2023), Means and Ends: The Revolutionary Practice of Anarchism in Europe and the United States, Edinburgh: AK Press, ISBN 978-1-84935-498-1
- Cahm, Caroline (1989), Kropotkin and the rise of revolutionary anarchism, 1872-1886, Cambridge; New York: Cambridge University Press (CUP), ISBN 0-521-36445-0
- Eisenzweig, Uri (2001). Fictions de l'anarchisme [Fictions of anarchism] (in French). France: C. Bourgois. ISBN 2-267-01570-6.
