= François Dumartheray =

- Born: 27 January 1842; Collonges-sous-Salève, France
- Died: 8 September 1931 (aged 89); Lyon, France
- Years active: 1868–1880
- Movement: Anarchist communism

François Dumartheray (27 January 1842 – 8 September 1931) was a French anarcho-communist activist. He was a member of the International Workingmen's Association and the Jura Federation, and collaborated with Peter Kropotkin in the journal Le Révolté.

== Biography ==
François Dumartheray was born on 27 January 1842, in Savoy, into a peasant family. Having only received a primary school education, he worked as a waiter in a cafe and later as a salesman.

He joined the Icarians of L'Avenir in Lyon, where a local branch of the International Workingmen's Association (IWA) was established in 1868. On 13 March 1870, Dumartheray was elected as a member of the federal commission of the IWA. In May 1870, he was arrested for his participation in the IWA, but was amnestied following the proclamation of the French Third Republic. He took refuge in Geneva, Switzerland, where he was elected to the Congress of the Jura Federation in September 1873. At the Congress, he proposed that only manual labourers would be permitted to join the International.

In February 1876, Dumartheray published the pamphlet Aux travailleurs manuels partisans de l'action politique, in which he advocated for "anarchist communism" – in the first documented use of the term. Along with Élisée Reclus, Dumartheray promoted the adoption of anarchist communism by the Anti-Authoritarian International, quickly gaining support from the Italian anarchists. In August 1877, he returned to France in disguise and using the pseudonym "Versoix", in order to participate in the constitution of a French anti-authoritarian federation at a congress in La Chaux-de-Fonds. During the 1877 French legislative election, Dumartheray published the federation's abstentionist manifesto. In 1878, his paper Avante-Garde was shut down and he returned to Geneva, where he, Peter Kropotkin and Georges Herzig founded the newspaper Le Révolté in February 1879.

By this time, a split had ruptured the International, as collectivists from Spain and democratic socialists from Belgium rejected the anarchist communist approach. Anarchist communism was finally adopted by at Jura Federation's congress of 1880, in the last act of the International. That year, Dumartheray was offered amnesty by the French government of Jules Grévy, but he decided not to return to France and largely ceased political activities. He remained in Geneva until 1927. He died and was cremated on 8 September 1931.
