= Alexandra Kropotkin =

British-American writer and translator (1887–1966)

- Portrait by Gerald Kelly, c. 1922
- Born: Alexandra Petrovna Kropotkin; April 15, 1887; Bromley, London, England
- Died: July 4, 1966 (aged 79); New York City, U.S.
- Other name: Sasha Kropotkin
- Occupations: Writer; translator
- Parents: Peter Kropotkin (father); Sophie Kropotkin (mother)

Alexandra Petrovna "Sasha" Kropotkin (1887–1966) was a New York–based writer and Russian language translator. Her parents, Russian scientist and anarchist Peter Kropotkin and his wife Sophia Kropotkin, were a socially prominent family descended from Kropotkin nobility. Alexandra was born while they were in exile in Great Britain; they returned to Russia after the 1917 revolution and lived there until her father's death, after which she emigrated to New York. Although her father had disowned his royal title, Alexandra reclaimed it by writing a women's column for the magazine Liberty under the byline "Princess Alexandra Kropotkin". She also translated Russian literature into English and wrote a Russian cookbook that The New York Times considered "best-in-class".

== Early life and career ==
Alexandra Petrovna Kropotkin was born on April 15, 1887, in Bromley, London, where her family was living in exile. She was the sole child of anarchist luminary Peter Kropotkin (1842–1921) and was named after his brother, Alexander, who had committed suicide in Siberian exile the year prior. Her mother Sophie was a Ukrainian Jewish lecturer and writer a decade younger than Kropotkin; the couple married in Switzerland in October 1878 while she was still a student. The Kropotkins descend from an early medieval Russian ruler, Rurik, but her father disowned his royal title of "prince" and was, in turn, disowned by his father. In their English exile, the family was socially prominent at the turn of the century and hosted salons on Sundays. Following the 1917 Russian Revolution, they returned to Russia, where Alexandra stayed until 1921. After her father's death, she settled in New York.

Kropotkin, like her father, cared little for her royal title but used it to establish her American career with the byline "Princess Alexandra Kropotkin". She wrote "To the Ladies!", a regular column in the general interest magazine Liberty from 1931 to 1942. She continued to write on cooking, home economics, etiquette, relationships, and other topics intended for women readers. Her Russian cookbook, How to Cook and Eat in Russian, was reissued by Scribner's in 1964 as The Best of Russian Cooking. The New York Times Book Review considered it the best cookbook on the subject. She also produced an English translation of Crime and Punishment, a revised English edition of The Brothers Karamazov, and Russian translations of several George Bernard Shaw plays.

== Personal life ==
Interview with Kropotkin on life in Russia, 1951

Kropotkin, known as Sasha, promoted her father's legacy but was not an anarchist herself, a subject of disappointment for his followers. She spoke publicly about his memory at the Libertarian Book Club and maintained connection with his social group. At the time of her 1927 arrival in New York, Kropotkin favored the soviet system and opposed both the Communist government of the Soviet Union and any potential restoration of the czarist order. In the 1964 United States presidential election, Kropotkin supported the conservative Barry Goldwater.

While living in London, Kropotkin had a relationship and brief affair with author W. Somerset Maugham. Several of Maugham's characters are based on her. The two later reunited in Russia when Maugham was on an espionage mission and Kropotkin volunteered as his translator. She introduced Maugham to Alexander Kerensky, attended their weekly dinners, and sometimes hosted at her apartment.

Kropotkin married Boris Lebedev, a young Social Revolutionary Party member, in 1910. They divorced in 1920. While in Russia, Kropotkin met the newspaper journalist Lorimer Hammond, whom she married in August 1927. Her only child, an ambulance nurse, died in London in 1944. Kropotkin died in New York on July 4, 1966.
