= Page Corps =

Imperial Russian military academy

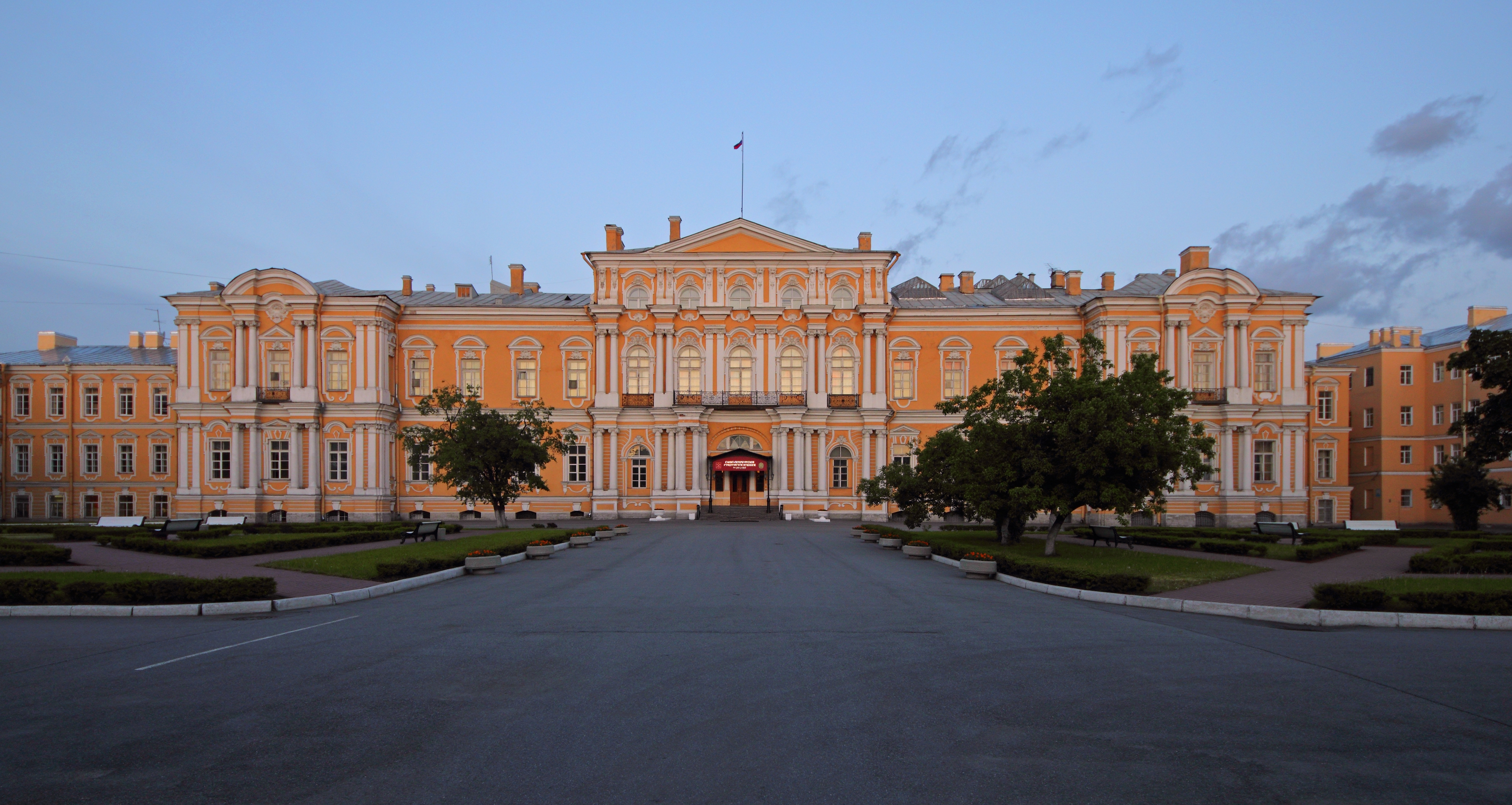
From 1810 until 1917, the Page Corps was located in the Vorontsov Palace, which was designed by Francesco Rastrelli around 1749.

The Page Corps (Russian: Пажеский корпус, romanized: Pazhyeskiy korpus; French: Corps des Pages) was a military academy in Imperial Russia, which prepared sons of the nobility and of senior officers for military service. Similarly, the Imperial School of Jurisprudence prepared boys for civil service. The present-day equivalent of the Page Corps and other Imperial military academies may be said to be the Suvorov Military Schools, though none of these was established before 1943.

== History ==
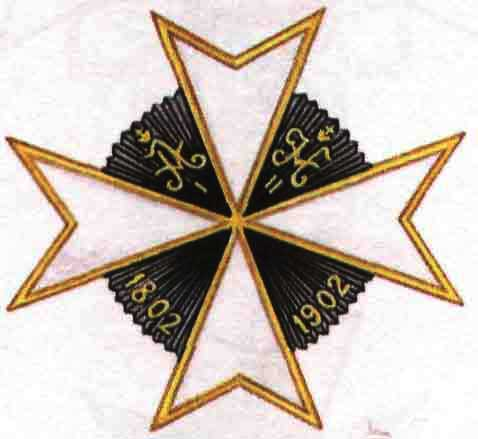
Emblem of the Page Corps

The Page Corps was founded in 1759 in Saint Petersburg as a school for teaching and training pages and chamber pages. In light of the need for properly trained officers for the Guard units, the Page Corps was reorganized in 1802 into an educational establishment similar to cadet schools. It would accept the sons of the hereditary nobility of Russian lands, and the sons of at least Lieutenant Generals/Vice Admirals or grandsons of full Generals/Admirals.

In 1810, the school was moved to the palace of the Sovereign Order of Saint John of Jerusalem, also known as Vorontsov Palace. It continued at this location in Saint Petersburg for over one hundred years, until the Russian Revolution in 1917.

The Corps des Pages, as it was generally referred to in pre-Revolutionary Russia, was the only military academy (out of about twenty) to prepare future officers for all arms. The others were devoted to specialized training for cavalry, infantry, artillery, engineers, cossacks, topographical studies, etc.

== Life in the Page Corps ==
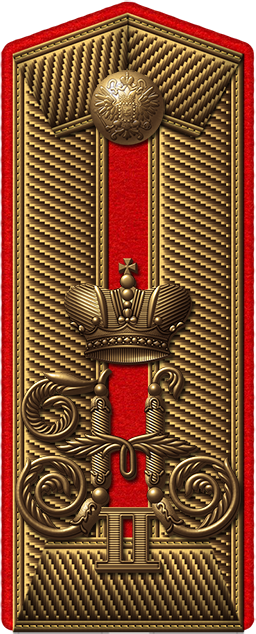
Shoulder strap Page (Pages-Corps His Imperial Majesty, 1914).

In common with the other Russian military schools, the Page Corps imposed a harsh regime on its cadets. Corporal punishment involved beatings with a birch for even minor offences, and bullying of younger students by their seniors was common.

Peter Kropotkin's memoirs detail the hazing and other abuse of pages for which the Corps had become notorious.

== Court role and privileges ==
The students served on a rotational basis as pages at Court and provided services at ceremonies, including attendance upon individual members of the Imperial family.

Graduates from the Page Corps had the unique privilege of joining the regiment of their own choice, regardless of the existing vacancies (however, as a matter of etiquette, the consent of the unit's commander was sought beforehand). As serving officers, they wore, on the left side of their tunic, the badge of the Page Corps, modeled after the cross of the Order of Saint John.

== Graduation ==
Upon graduation, the cadets received the rank of podporuchik (cornet in cavalry). While most graduates entered the Russian Imperial Army as officers, a minority opted for diplomatic or civil service careers.

== Uniform ==
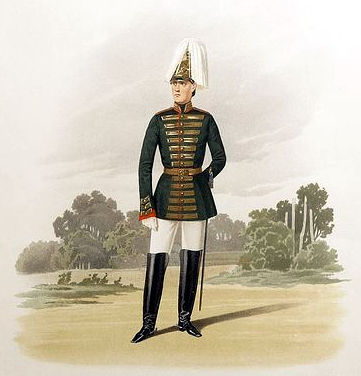
19th-century gala uniform

The Page Corps had a range of uniforms for different purposes. The most spectacular of these was the gala uniform worn for Court functions. This comprised a spiked helmet with white plume, a dark green tunic with gold braid covering the front, white breeches and high boots.

== Disbandment ==
From its inception until 1917, the Page Corps graduated 4,505 officers. An additional 200 were unable to complete their courses because of the revolution of 1917. The school effectively ceased to function following the overthrow of Tsar Nicholas II in February 1917, and it was finally closed in June of the same year on the orders of Alexander Kerensky, War Minister of the Provisional Government.
