= Fields, Factories, and Workshops =

1899 book by anarchist Peter Kropotkin

- Author: Peter Kropotkin
- Language: English
- Subject: decentralization of industries
- Published: 1899
- Publisher: Houghton Mifflin Harcourt

Fields, Factories, and Workshops is an 1899 book by Russian anarchist Peter Kropotkin that discusses the decentralization of industries, possibilities of agriculture, and uses of small industries.

Before the book, Kropotkin had been known for his militant activity in behalf of international anarchism and writings on Siberian geography. Through the book, he sought to connect anarchism with science, based on sociological tendencies. The book was compiled from essays he had published in Nineteenth Century and Forum between 1888 and 1890. The book was first published in 1899 by Houghton-Mifflin (Boston) and Hutchinson (London) to favorable reviews among Britons. It has since been republished in multiple editions: Swan Sonnenschein (London) and Putnam (New York) in 1901, 1904, 1907, 1909, and Nelson (London) and Putnam (New York) in 1913 and 1919. Reproductions of the first and second editions appeared in 1968. A later edition, edited by Colin Ward for Harper & Row, released in 1974 with more contemporary illustrations as Fields, Factories and Workshops Tomorrow.

== See also ==
- List of books about anarchism

== Bibliography ==
- Oved, Yaacov (1992) [1899]. "Introduction to the Transaction Edition". Fields, Factories, and Workshops. Transaction Publishers. ISBN 978-1-4128-2358-6.
- Seligman, Edwin R. A. (1899). "Review of Fields, Factories and Workshops". Political Science Quarterly. 14 (2): 335–337. doi:10.2307/2139789. ISSN 0032-3195. JSTOR 2139789.
