= Peter Kropotkin =

Russian anarchist (1842–1921)

- Пётр Кропоткин
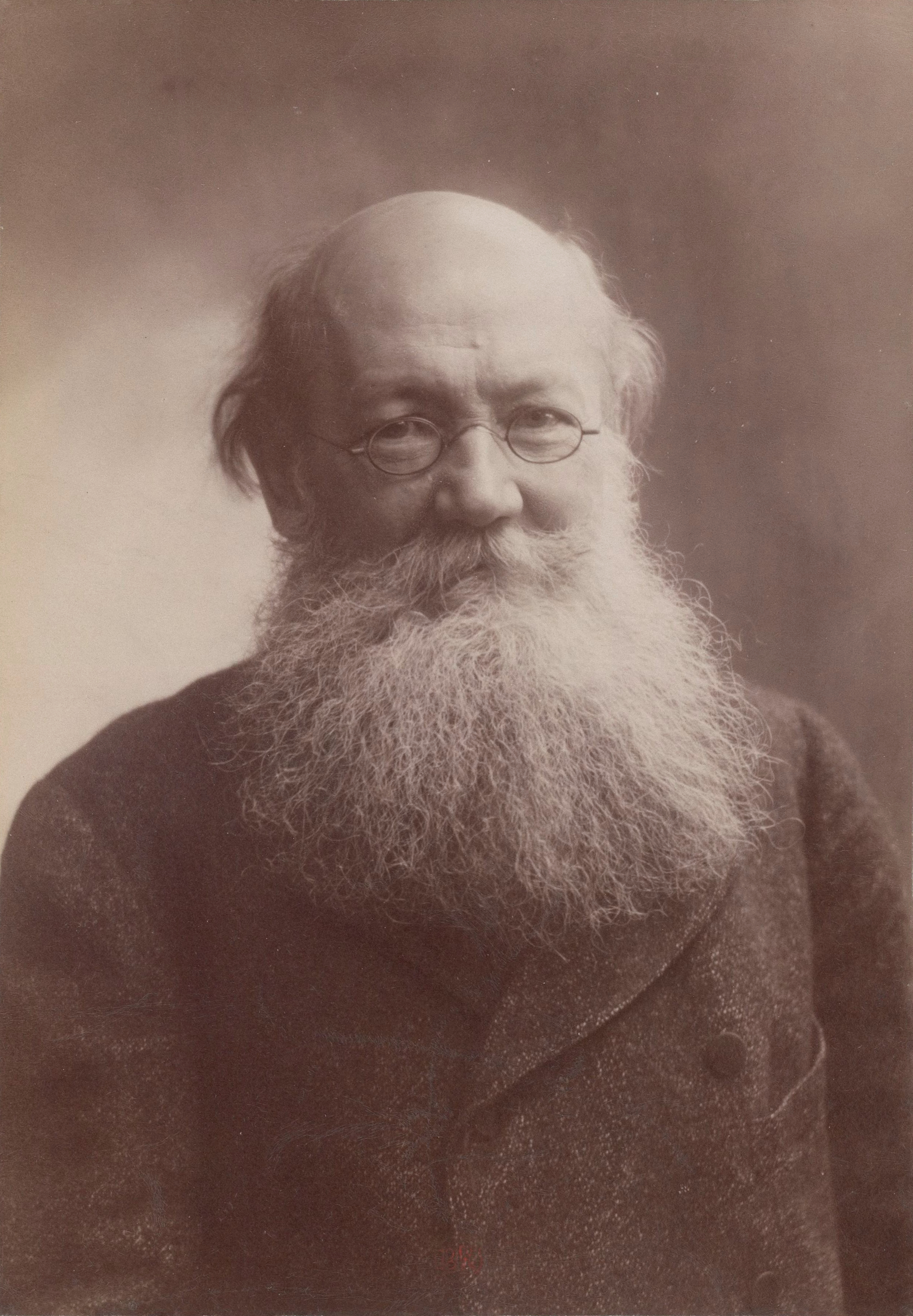
- Photograph by Nadar, c. 1900
- Born: Pyotr Alexeyevich Kropotkin; 9 December [O.S. 27 November] 1842; Moscow, Russian Empire
- Died: 8 February 1921 (aged 78); Dmitrov, Russian SFSR
- Resting place: Novodevichy Cemetery, Moscow
- Spouse: Sofia Ananyeva-Rabinovich
- Children: Alexandra
- Family: Kropotkin

Education
- Education: Corps of Pages (1857–1862); Saint Petersburg Imperial University (enrolled 1867; did not graduate)

Philosophical work
- Era: 19th-century philosophy; 20th-century philosophy
- Region: Russian philosophy; Western philosophy
- School: Anarchism; Communism; Socialism
- Main interests: Political philosophy; Political history; Economics; Ethics; Darwinian theory; Geography
- Notable works: The Conquest of Bread (1892); Fields, Factories, and Workshops (1899); Memoirs of a Revolutionist (1899); Mutual Aid: A Factor of Evolution (1902)
- Notable ideas: Political, ethical and economic theory of anarcho-communism; Mutual aid; Criticism of wage labor; Five-hour workday; Communal kitchens; Voluntary communes
- Military career
- Allegiance: Russian Empire
- Unit: Corps of Pages
- Commands: Aide-de-camp to the Governor of Transbaikal; Attaché for Cossack affairs to the Governor-General of East Siberia

Pyotr Alexeyevich Kropotkin (Note: Pronounced /kroʊˈpɒtkɪn/; Russian: Пётр Алексе́евич Кропо́ткин, pronounced [ˈpʲɵtr ɐlʲɪkˈsʲejɪvʲɪt͡ɕ krɐˈpotkʲɪn]; usually anglicized to Peter Kropotkin.) (9 December [O.S. 27 November] 1842 – 8 February 1921) was a Russian anarchist political philosopher and geographer known as a proponent of anarchist communism.

Born into an aristocratic land-owning family, Kropotkin attended the Page Corps and later served as an officer in Siberia, where he participated in several geological expeditions. He was imprisoned for his activism in 1874 and managed to escape two years later. He spent the next 41 years in exile in Switzerland, France (where he was imprisoned for almost four years), and England. While in exile, he gave lectures and published widely on anarchism and geography. Kropotkin returned to Russia after the Russian Revolution in 1917, but he was disappointed by the Bolshevik state.

Kropotkin was a proponent of the idea of decentralized communist society free from central government and based on voluntary associations of self-governing communities and worker-run enterprises. He wrote many books, pamphlets and articles, the most prominent being The Conquest of Bread (1892) and Fields, Factories, and Workshops (1899), with Mutual Aid: A Factor of Evolution (1902) being his principal scientific offering. He contributed the article on anarchism to the eleventh edition of the Encyclopædia Britannica and left an unfinished work on anarchist ethical philosophy.

== Biography ==
=== Early life (1842–1862) ===
Kropotkin was born in Moscow on 9 December 1842, in the Konyushennaya ("Equerries") district. (Note: His birth date was 27 November in the Russian Old Style calendar.) His father, Alexey, was a typical royal officer who owned serfs in three provinces and whose family descended from the princes of Smolensk. His mother, Ekatarina Sulima, was the daughter of General Nikolai Sulima and a descendant of a Zaporozhian Cossack leader. Peter, the youngest of her four children, was three years old when she died of tuberculosis. Kropotkin's father remarried two years later. This stepmother was indifferent towards the Kropotkin children and had a streak of jealous vindictiveness, going to great lengths to remove the memory of Kropotkin's mother.

With his father mostly absent, Kropotkin and his older brother, Alexander, were raised by their German nurse. Kropotkin developed an enduring compassion for the estate's servants and serfs who cared for him and relayed stories of his mother's kindness. He was raised in the family's Moscow mansion and an estate in Nikolskoye, Kaluga Oblast, outside Moscow.

At the age of eight, Kropotkin attended Tsar Nicholas I's Royal Ball. Commending the child's costume, the tsar chose Kropotkin for his Page Corps, an elite school in St. Petersburg that combined military and court education and produced the tsar's imperial attendants. Kropotkin joined the Page Corps as a teenager and began a 14-year epistolary relationship with his brother that charts his intellectual and emotional development. By the time of his arrival, Kropotkin had already shown a populist position towards the emancipation of serfs and a nature of revolt against his father and the school's hazing. Kropotkin began his first underground revolutionary writings at the school, where he advocated for a Russian constitution. He developed an interest in science, reading, and opera. As a top student, Kropotkin became a sergeant-major in 1861 and was thrust into court life, serving as the emperor's personal Page de Chambre. His views of the tsar and court life soured as imperial policy changed over the next year. Privately, he was preoccupied with the need to live a societally useful life.

=== Career in Siberia (1862–early 1870s) ===
For his tour of service, in 1862, he chose the Amur Cossacks in east Siberia, an undesirable post that would let him study the technical mathematics of artillery, travel, live in nature, and achieve financial independence from his father. He developed a firm worldview of compassion for the poor and contrasted the pride and dignity of the yeoman peasant farmers against the indignities of serfdom. He wrote approvingly of the cultivated Transbaikalia governor-general Boleslav Kukel, to whom Kropotkin reported. Kukel engaged Kropotkin in prison reform and city self-governance projects that the central government ultimately denied. The exiled poet and political prisoner Mikhail Larionovitch Mikhailov introduced Kropotkin to anarchism by recommending he read an essay by Pierre-Joseph Proudhon. Kropotkin's brother came to live with him in Irkutsk.

After Kukel's ouster in early 1863, Kropotkin found solace in geographical work. He led a disguised reconnaissance expedition to find a direct route through Manchuria from Chita to Vladivostok the next year. He explored the East Siberian Mountains in the north the year after. The mountain measurements from his 1866 Olekminsk-Vitimsk expedition confirmed his Manchurian hypothesis that the Siberian area from the Ural Mountains to the Pacific Ocean was a plateau and not a plain. This discovery of the Patom and Vitim Plateaus won him a gold medal from the Russian Geographical Society and led to the commercialization of the Lena gold fields. A range of mountains in this region was later named for him.

Kropotkin covered Siberia for St. Petersburg newspapers since his arrival, including the condition of the Polish political exiles who participated in the unsuccessful 1866 Baikal Insurrection. Kropotkin secured a promise from the governor-general to suspend the prisoners' death sentences, which was reneged upon. Disillusioned, Kropotkin and his brother resolved to leave the military. His time in Siberia taught him to appreciate peasant social organization and convinced him that administrative reform was an ineffectual means to improve social conditions.

Russian locales of Kropotkin's early career

After five years in Siberia, Kropotkin and his brother moved to St. Petersburg, where they continued their schooling and academic work. Kropotkin took a position with the Russian interior ministry with no duties. He studied mathematics, physics, and geography at the university. After presenting his Vitim expedition findings, Kropotkin accepted the Russian Geographical Society's part-time offer of its Physical Geography section Secretaryship. Kropotkin translated Herbert Spencer's work for additional income. He continued to develop a theory, which he considered his best scientific contribution, that the East Siberian mountains were part of a large plateau and not independent ridges. Kropotkin participated in a 1870 polar expedition plan that postulated the existence of what was later discovered as the Franz Josef Land Arctic archipelago.

In early 1871, he was commissioned to study the Ice Age in Scandinavian geography, in which Kropotkin developed theories of the glaciation of Europe and the glacial lakes of its northeast. His father died later that year, and Kropotkin inherited a wealthy estate in Tambov. Kropotkin turned down the Geographical Society's offer of its general secretary position, instead choosing to work on his Ice Age data and interest in bettering the lives of peasants.

=== Turn to anarchism and imprisonment in Russia (early 1870s) ===
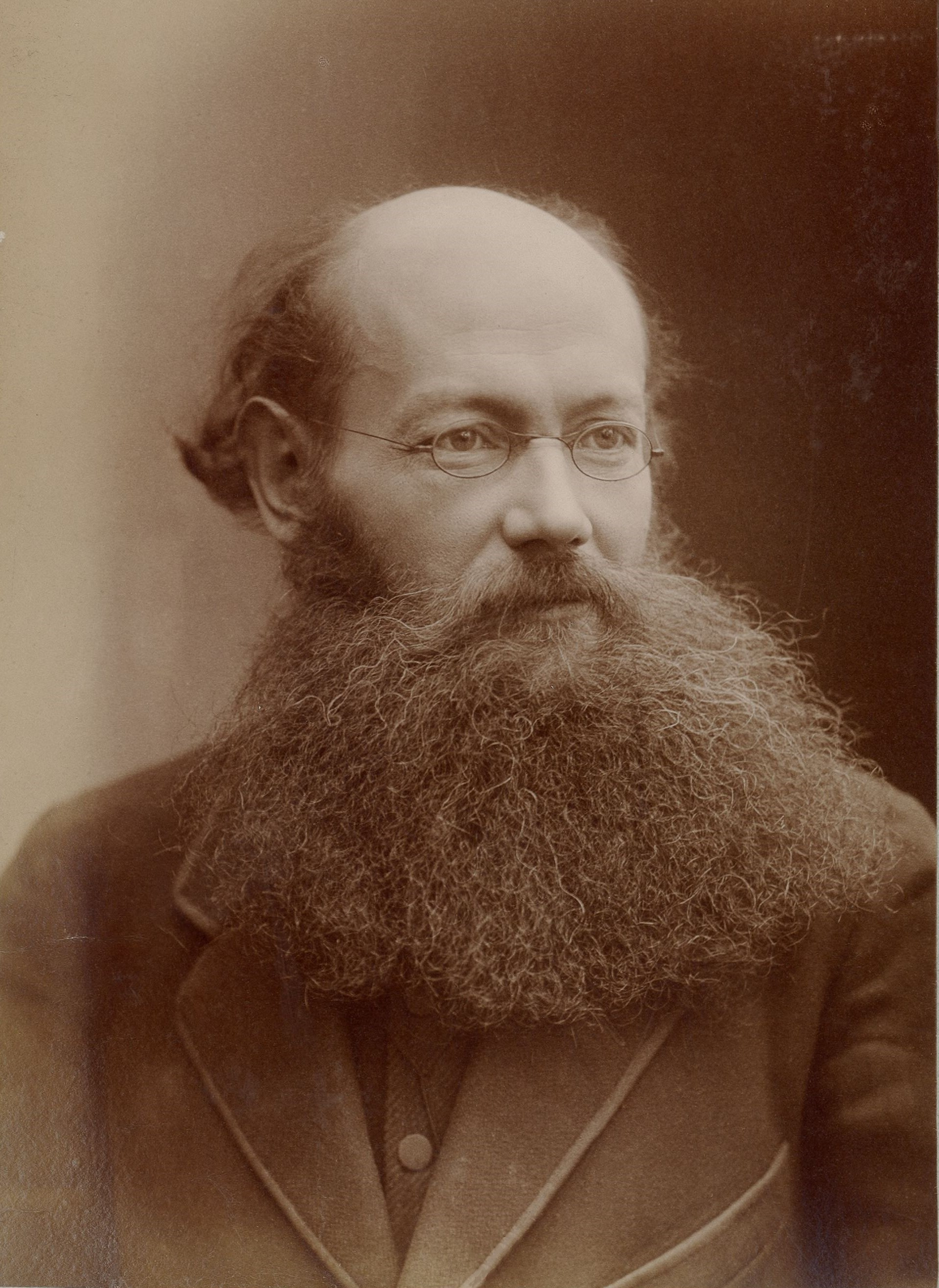
Kropotkin in 1876

While Kropotkin became increasingly revolutionary in his writings, he was not known for activism. He was spurred by the 1871 Paris Commune and the trial of Sergey Nechayev. He and his brother attended meetings on the Franco-Prussian War and revolutionism. Likely at the encouragement of a Swiss extended family member and his own desire to see the socialist workers' movement, Kropotkin set out to see Switzerland and Western Europe in February 1872. Over three months, he met Mikhail Sazhin in Zurich, worked and fell out with Nikolai Utin's Marxist group in Geneva, and was introduced to the Jura Federation's James Guillaume and Adhémar Schwitzguébel. The Jura were the main internal opposition to the Marxist-controlled First International, as followers of Mikhail Bakunin. Kropotkin was quickly impressed and was instantly converted to anarchism by the group's egalitarianism and independence of expression, but narrowly missed meeting the leading anarchist, Bakunin, while there. (Note: Kropotkin previously had some passing familiarity with Bakunin. Historians wrote that Bakunin likely did not wish to meet Kropotkin based on the latter's familial connection to the socialist Peter Lavrov.) Kropotkin visited Belgium's movement before returning to Russia in May with contraband literature.

Back in St. Petersburg, Kropotkin joined the Chaikovsky Circle, a group of revolutionaries that Kropotkin considered more educational than revolutionary in their activities. Kropotkin believed in the inevitability of social revolution and the need for stateless social organization. His populist revolutionary program for the group emphasized the role of urban workers and peasants, whereas the group's moderates concentrated on students. Partially for this reason, he declined to contribute his personal wealth to the group. He viewed professionals as unlikely to forgo their privileges and judged them to not live societally useful lives. His program emphasized federated agrarian communes and a revolutionary party. While he could speak powerfully, Kropotkin was not a successful organizer.

Kropotkin's first political memo in November 1873 covered his basic plan for stateless social reconstruction, including common property, worker control of factories, shared physical labor towards societal need, and labor vouchers in lieu of money. He emphasized living among commoners and using propaganda to focus mass dissatisfaction. He rejected the Nechayev conspiracy model. Members of the circle began to be arrested in late 1873, and the Third Section secret police came for Kropotkin in March 1874.

His arrest for agitation, as a former page de chambre and officer, was scandalous. Kropotkin had just filed his Ice Age report and had been recently elected president of the Geographical Society's Physical and Mathematical Department. At the society's request, the tsar granted Kropotkin books to finish his glaciation report. Kropotkin was held in the Peter and Paul Fortress. His brother, who had also been radicalized as a follower of Lavrov, was also arrested and exiled in Siberia, where he committed suicide about a decade later.

Kropotkin was moved to the House of Detention prison military hospital in St. Petersburg for poor health, with the help of his sister. With assistance from friends, he escaped from the minimum-security prison in June 1876. By way of Scandinavia and England, Kropotkin arrived in Switzerland by the end of the year, where he met Italian anarchists Carlo Cafiero and Errico Malatesta. He visited Belgium and Zurich, where he met French geographer Élisée Reclus, who became a close friend.

=== Exile in Switzerland and the Congress of London (late 1870s–1881) ===
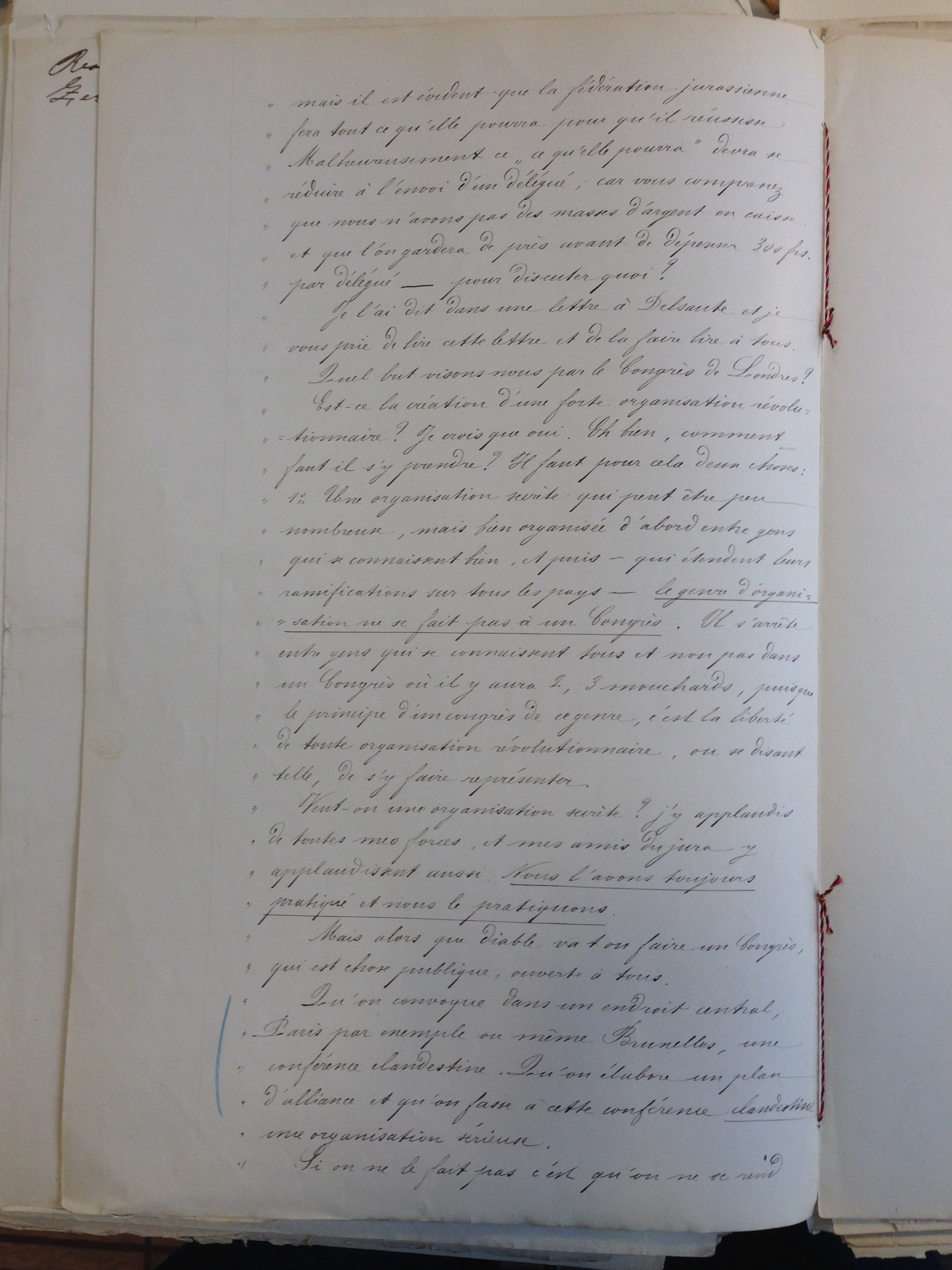
Parts of a letter by Kropotkin to Malatesta before the London Congress (27 February 1881)

Kropotkin associated with the Jura Federation and began editing its publication. There he met Ukrainian Jewish student Sofia Ananieva-Rabinovich, and the two were married in 1878. In 1879, he started Le Révolté, a revolutionary fortnightly, in Geneva that published his personal articulation of anarchist communism, the idea of distributing work product communally based on need rather than by work. He became the philosophy's most prominent proponent, despite not creating it. The philosophy became part of the Jura program in 1880 at Kropotkin's advocacy. Le Révolté also published Kropotkin's best-known pamphlet, "An Appeal to the Young", in 1880.

Before the Ghent Congress (1877), Kropotkin and other members of the Anti-authoritarian International met in La Chaux-de-Fonds and agreed to reorganize "their revolutionary community". He was appointed corresponding secretary of this small group, which probably included names among James Guillaume, Adhémar Schwitzguébel, Jean-Louis Pindy, Paul Brousse, Andrea Costa, Vinas, Morago, Cafiero, and Malatesta. Information regarding this group and its activities for the years 1879-1881 has been largely lost, with the exception of a few preserved letters.

In 1880-1881, a new situation arose for Kropotkin and this group when, following an appeal from Belgian socialists, several socialist factions, including Johann Most's revolutionary socialists, sought to refound (or perpetuate) the International on new foundations at the London Congress. Some anarchists of the anti-authoritarian International were skeptical, considering that the International still existed. Kropotkin was also relatively opposed about the idea of turning the International into a secret organization oriented toward propaganda of the deed, according to historian Caroline Cahm - he wrote The Spirit of Revolt during this period to make some of his ideas heard. On this matter, he would have clashed with Malatesta, who was a fervent supporter of both the idea and the congress.

Ultimately, Kropotkin agreed to participate and spoke for the Jura Federation and the Lyon Revolutionary Federation, according to his own testimony, and although he was opposed to several points of the congress, decided to vote in favour of its resolutions. Overall, he occupied a central role within the congress. Historiographically, this congress marked the birth of the Black International.

He then returned to Switzerland, where he resumed his editorial work for Le Révolté and published his reports on the congress, in which he omitted the conflicts that had pitted him against the French and German factions. In his articles, Kropotkin called for all workers to join the newly reconstituted International Workingmen's Association.

A few days later, on 23 August 1881, he was expelled from Switzerland by a decree of the Federal Council, specifically citing the article The Action in Le Révolté, which praised propaganda of the deed. This particularly inflammatory article is a subject of debate among historians: on one hand, Caroline Cahm argues that he could not have been the author; on the other hand, other historians, including Martin A. Miller, Jean Maitron (in part), and the edition of his own works authorized by Max Nettlau himself, contends that he was indeed the author. Uri Eisenzweig tends to also disagree with Cahm's assesment.

=== Exile in France, trial of the 66 and imprisonment (1881–1886) ===
After being expelled Kropotkin moved to Thonon-les-Bains, France, near Geneva, so that his wife could finish her Swiss education. While he was in France, he met several anarchists in various areas, including Pierre Martin in Vienne, one of the main members of the Indignated group of which Jacques Zuida and Auguste Ebersold were members. In parallel with his move to Thonon, in France, new political events, specifically the amnesty of the Communards (1879-1880) and their return from exile or deportation, were giving fresh momentum to revolutionary and more specifically anarchist circles.

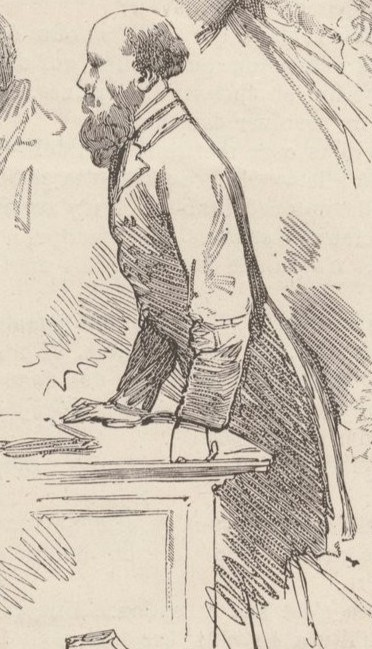
Kropotkin during the trial in Le Monde illustré

During the year 1882, the situation in France became increasingly unstable, particularly around Lyon and the surrounding regions; the French State and the anarchists moved toward an increasingly confrontational stance, exacerbated by the severe famine affecting the city of Lyon. In the first half of the year, two anarchist workers shot their bosses and were celebrated in the anarchist press. Then, during the summer of 1882, events accelerated with the Black International congress held in Geneva in August, followed the next day by the start of the Montceau-les-Mines troubles. In Lyon itself, these riots and insurrections were met with waves of repression and arrests, as the Lyon Revolutionary Federation was accused of being behind the Black Band. In October, Fanny Madignier and at least two other anarchists carried out the Assommoir bombing to avenge these waves of repression, which in turn led to a new and much more significant crackdown. The arrests and raids took place following the Assommoir bombing and affected hundreds of anarchists across France. These actions were not based on charges related to the bombings themselves, for which the defendants' guilt could be difficult to prove, but rather by reusing the Dufaure Law which banned the International.

Kropotkin was arrested in mid-December 1882 under very precarious circumstances, as his wife's brother had died in the house that very same day. The following month, he was one of the main defendants during the Trial of the 66, which brought together as many anarchists accused of belonging to the Black International - the other main ones were Toussaint Bordat, Joseph Bernard and Émile Gautier. This was an attempt by the French authorities to halt the growth of anarchists in the country by targeting them using the Dufaure Law. To prove their charges, the prosecutor called upon the London Congress and Kropotkin's participation in it. Despite eloquent speeches, where he defended himself with vigor and tact, the trial, which did not take place before a jury since it was not in a cour d'assises, offered him little chance of avoiding conviction, according to historian Martin A. Miller. Kropotkin was a co-signatory of the anarchist declaration read by fellow companion Alexandre Tressaud during the trial. He was ultimately sentenced to the maximum penalty possible under the Dufaure Law (5 years' imprisonment) and decided not to appeal.

He was sentenced to five years in Lyon. In early 1883, he was transferred to the Clairvaux Prison, where he continued his academic work. A public campaign of intellectuals and French legislators called for his release. Reclus published Words of a Rebel, a compilation of Kropotkin's Révolté writings while he was in prison, which became a main source of Kropotkin's thoughts on revolution.

=== Exile in the United Kingdom (1886–1917) ===
As Kropotkin's health worsened from scurvy and malaria, France released him in early 1886. He would stay in England through 1917, settling in Harrow, London, apart from brief trips to other European countries.

In London in late 1886, he co-founded Freedom, an anarchist monthly and the first English anarchist periodical, which he continued to support for almost three decades. His first and only child, Alexandra Kropotkin, was born the next year. He published multiple books over the coming years, including In Russian and French Prisons and The Conquest of Bread. His intellectual circle in London included William Morris and W. B. Yeats as well as old Russian friends Sergey Stepnyak-Kravchinsky and Nikolai Tchaikovsky. Kropotkin contributed to the Geographical Journal and Nature.

While he was in London and growing increasingly interested in syndicalist anarchism, he went to the Autonomie Club to make speeches in support of these orientations. He also played a role during the Bruderkrieg, a conflict within the German anarchist movement, during which he supported Peukert's faction, initially in a rather discreet manner and later more openly.

After 1890, according to biographers George Woodcock and Ivan Avakumović, Kropotkin became more of a scholarly recluse and less of a propagandist. His works' revolutionary zeal subsided as he turned to social, ethical, and scientific questions. He joined the British Association for the Advancement of Science. He continued to contribute to Freedom but was no longer an editor.

Several of Kropotkin's books began as journal articles. His writings on anarchist communist social life were printed in the French successor to Le Révolté and later revised into The Conquest of Bread in 1892. Kropotkin's writings on decentralizing production and industry against the countervailing trend of centralized industrialization were compiled into his Fields, Factories, and Workshops in 1899. His research throughout the 1890s on the animal instinct for cooperation as a counterpoint to Darwinism became a series of articles in Nineteenth Century and, later, the book Mutual Aid: A Factor of Evolution, which was widely translated.

Following a scientific congress in Toronto in 1897, Kropotkin toured Canada. His experience there led him to advise the Russian Doukhobors who sought to immigrate there. He helped facilitate their emigration in 1899. Kropotkin entered the United States and met Johann Most, Emma Goldman, and Benjamin Tucker. American publishers published his Memoirs of a Revolutionist and Fields, Factories, and Workshops by the end of the decade. He visited the United States again in 1901 at the invitation of the Lowell Institute to give lectures on Russian literature that were later published. He published The Great French Revolution (1909), The Terror in Russia (1909), and Modern Science and Anarchism (1913). His 70th birthday in 1912 had celebratory gatherings in London and Paris.

Kropotkin's support for Western entry into World War I, siding with Britain and France, divided the anarchist movement, which had been anti-war, and damaged his esteem as a luminary of socialism. He exacerbated this by insisting, with returning to Russia, that Russians support the war as well.

=== Return to Russia (1917) ===
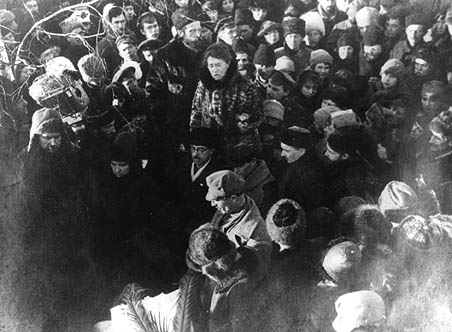
Emma Goldman delivering a eulogy at Kropotkin's funeral

With the outbreak of the Russian Revolution, Kropotkin returned to Russia in June 1917. He refused the Petrograd Provisional Government's offer of a cabinet seat. In August, he advocated for defending Russia and the revolution at the National State Conference. Kropotkin applied for a residence in Moscow in 1918, which was personally approved by Vladimir Lenin, head of the Soviet government. Months later, finding life in Moscow difficult in his old age, Kropotkin moved with his family to a friend's home in the nearby town of Dmitrov.

In 1919, Emma Goldman visited his family there. Kropotkin met Lenin in Moscow and corresponded by mail to discuss political questions of the day. He advocated for workers' cooperatives and argued against the Bolsheviks' hostage policy and centralization of authority, while simultaneously encouraging Western comrades to stop their governments' military interventions in Russia. Kropotkin ultimately had little impact on the Russian revolution, but his advocacy work for political and anarchist prisoners in Russia, and for the anti-interventionist Russian Revolution, during the last four years of his life replenished some of the goodwill he had lost due to his support for the Western powers in World War I.

=== Death and funerals (1921) ===
Kropotkin died of pneumonia on 8 February 1921. His family refused an offer of a state funeral. With his Moscow funeral, the Bolsheviks permitted the diminished Russian anarchist movement an official, restrained occasion to memorialize their figurehead. It was the last major anarchist demonstration of the period in Russia, because the movement and Kropotkin's writings were fully suppressed later that year.

== Philosophy ==
=== Critique of capitalism ===
Kropotkin critiqued what he considered to be the fallacies of the economic systems of feudalism and capitalism. He believed they create poverty and artificial scarcity and promote privilege. As an alternative, he proposed a more decentralized economic system based on mutual aid and voluntary cooperation. He argued that the tendencies for this kind of organization already exist, both in evolution and in human society.

Kropotkin disagreed in part with the Marxist critique of capitalism, including the labor theory of value, believing there was no necessary link between work performed and the values of commodities. His attack on the institution of wage labor was based more on the power employers exerted over employees, and not only on the extraction of surplus value from their labor. Kropotkin claimed this power was made possible by the state's protection of private ownership of productive resources. However, Kropotkin believed the possibility of surplus value was itself the problem, holding that a society would still be unjust if the workers of a particular industry kept their surplus to themselves, rather than redistributing it for the common good.

=== Critique of state socialism ===
Kropotkin believed that a communist society could be established only by a social revolution, which he described as, "... the taking possession by the people of all social wealth. It is the abolition of all the forces which have so long hampered the development of Humanity". However, he criticized forms of revolutionary methods (like those proposed by Marxism and Blanquism) that retained the use of state power, arguing that any central authority was incompatible with the dramatic changes needed by a social revolution. Kropotkin believed that the mechanisms of the state were deeply rooted in maintaining the power of one class over another, and thus could not be used to emancipate the working class. Instead, Kropotkin insisted that both private property and the state needed to be abolished together.

The economic change which will result from the Social Revolution will be so immense and so profound, it must so change all the relations based today on property and exchange, that it is impossible for one or any individual to elaborate the different social forms, which must spring up in the society of the future. [...] Any authority external to it will only be an obstacle, only a trammel on the organic labor which must be accomplished, and beside that a source of discord and hatred.

Kropotkin believed that any post-revolutionary government would lack the local knowledge to organize a diverse population. Their vision of society would be limited by their own vindictive, self-serving, or narrow ideals. To ensure order, preserve authority, and organize production the state would need to use violence and coercion to suppress further revolution, and control workers. The workers would be reliant on the state bureaucracy to organize them, so they would never develop the initiative to self-organize as they needed. This would lead to the re-creation of classes, an oppressed workforce, and eventually another revolution. Thus, Kropotkin wrote that maintaining the state would paralyze any true social revolution, making the idea of a "revolutionary government" a contradiction in terms:

We know that Revolution and Government are incompatible; one must destroy the other, no matter what name is given to government, whether dictator, royalty, or parliament. We know that what makes the strength and the truth of our party is contained in this fundamental formula — "Nothing good or durable can be done except by the free initiative of the people, and every government tends to destroy it;" and so the very best among us, if their ideas had not to pass through the crucible of the popular mind, before being put into execution, and if they should become masters of that formidable machine — the government — and could thus act as they chose, would become in a week fit only for the gallows. We know whither every dictator leads, even the best intentioned, — namely to the death of all revolutionary movement.

Rather than a centralized approach, Kropotkin stressed the need for decentralized organization. He believed that dissolving the state would cripple counter-revolution without reverting to authoritarian methods of control, writing, "In order to conquer, something more than guillotines are required. It is the revolutionary idea, the truly wide revolutionary conception, which reduces its enemies to impotence by paralyzing all the instruments by which they have governed hitherto." He believed this was possible only through a widespread "Boldness of thought, a distinct and wide conception of all that is desired, constructive force arising from the people in proportion as the negation of authority dawns; and finally—the initiative of all in the work of reconstruction—this will give to the revolution the Power required to conquer." Also, Kropotkin considered the dialectical social technology method popular among the Marxist at the time as superstition.

Kropotkin applied this criticism to the Bolsheviks' rule following the October Revolution. Kropotkin summarized his thoughts in a 1919 letter to the workers of Western Europe, promoting the possibility of revolution, but also warning against the centralized control in Russia, which he believed had condemned them to failure. Kropotkin wrote to Lenin in 1920, describing the desperate conditions that he believed to be the result of bureaucratic organization, and urging Lenin to allow for local and decentralized institutions. Following an announcement of executions later that year, Kropotkin sent Lenin another furious letter, admonishing him for the terror which Kropotkin saw as needlessly destructive.

=== Cooperation and competition ===
In 1902, Kropotkin published his book Mutual Aid: A Factor of Evolution, which gave an alternative view of animal and human survival. At the time, some proponents of "social Darwinism" such as Francis Galton proffered a theory of interpersonal competition and natural hierarchy. Instead, Kropotkin argued that "it was an evolutionary emphasis on cooperation instead of competition in the Darwinian sense that made for the success of species, including the human". In the last chapter, he wrote:

In the animal world we have seen that the vast majority of species live in societies, and that they find in association the best arms for the struggle for life: understood, of course, in its wide Darwinian sense – not as a struggle for the sheer means of existence, but as a struggle against all natural conditions unfavourable to the species. The animal species [...] in which individual struggle has been reduced to its narrowest limits [...] and the practice of mutual aid has attained the greatest development [...] are invariably the most numerous, the most prosperous, and the most open to further progress. The mutual protection which is obtained in this case, the possibility of attaining old age and of accumulating experience, the higher intellectual development, and the further growth of sociable habits, secure the maintenance of the species, its extension, and its further progressive evolution. The unsociable species, on the contrary, are doomed to decay.

Contrary to popular belief, he did not deny the existence of selfishness or competitive struggle among organisms in nature, that is, "mutual struggle". He viewed cooperation and sociability among members of the same species as the best means to survive.

Biologist Stephen Jay Gould argued that Kropotkin's view was consistent with modern biological understanding. He agrees with Kropotkin's observations, noting that while Kropotkin did not deny the concept of competitive struggle, he believed that cooperative interactions were too often overlooked within it. He also points out that if cooperation increases the survival rate of an individual, there is no reason why it should be ruled out by natural selection, but rather, as he said, encouraged.

Kropotkin did not deny the presence of competitive urges in humans, but did not consider them the driving force of human history. He believed that seeking out conflict proved to be socially beneficial only in attempts to destroy injustice, as well as authoritarian institutions such as the state or the Russian Orthodox Church, which he saw as stifling human creativity and impeding human instinctual drive towards cooperation.

Kropotkin claimed that the benefits arising from mutual organization incentivize humans more than mutual strife. His hope was that in the long run, mutual organization would drive individuals to produce. Anarcho-primitivists and anarcho-communists believe that a gift economy can break the cycle of poverty. They rely on Kropotkin, who believed that the hunter-gatherers he had visited implemented mutual aid.

=== Mutual aid ===
In his 1892 book The Conquest of Bread, Kropotkin proposed a system of economics based on mutual exchanges made in a system of voluntary cooperation. He believed that in a society that is socially, culturally, and industrially developed enough to produce all the goods and services it needs, there would be no obstacle, such as preferential distribution, pricing, or monetary exchange, to prevent everyone from taking what they need from the social product. He supported the eventual abolition of money or tokens of exchange for goods and services.

Kropotkin believed that Mikhail Bakunin's collectivist economic model was just a wage system by a different name and that such a system would breed the same type of centralization and inequality as a capitalist wage system. He stated that it is impossible to determine the value of an individual's contributions to the products of labor and thought that anyone who was placed in a position of trying to make such determinations would wield authority over those whose wages they determined.

According to Kirkpatrick Sale, "[w]ith Mutual Aid especially, and later with Fields, Factories, and Workshops, Kropotkin was able to move away from the absurdist limitations of individual anarchism and no-laws anarchism that had flourished during this period and provide instead a vision of communal anarchism, following the models of independent cooperative communities he discovered while developing his theory of mutual aid. It was an anarchism that opposed centralized government and state-level laws as traditional anarchism did, but understood that at a certain small scale, communities and communes and co-ops could flourish and provide humans with a rich material life and wide areas of liberty without centralized control."

=== Self-sufficiency ===
Kropotkin's focus on local production led to his view that a country should strive for self-sufficiency by manufacturing its own goods and growing its own food, thus lessening the need to rely on imports. To these ends, he advocated irrigation and greenhouses to boost local food production.

=== Religion ===
Although in the past he harshly criticized religious morality, Kropotkin recognized the Christian anarchism of Leo Tolstoy as one of the four schools of thought in anarchism. Kropotkin and Tolstoy maintained, despite never meeting in person, a relationship of mutual respect. Kropotkin saw the origins of anarchism in Europe as found in various Christian movements, such as the Anabaptists and Hussites, mentioning figures such as the Italian Catholic bishop Marco Girolamo Vida and the German Anabaptist theologian Hans Denck.

Kropotkin admired Christianity and Buddhism, along with the figures of Jesus Christ and Buddha and their ethical teachings. Kropotkin did not see that Christianity introduced anything new in its defense of brotherhood and mutual aid, but considered Christian (and Buddhist) teaching on forgiveness to have been an innovation. In contrast with the ethics of vengeful pre-Christian cultures, the doctrine of Christ repudiates persecution and revenge. In the view of Kropotkin, "the true greatness of Christianity" lies in the words "do not take revenge on your enemies." Kropotkin also saw the Christian God as an improvement over the pagan gods, whom he considered vengeful and requiring submission on the part of the believer. Kropotkin's Ethics stated:

In the case of Christianity the love of the divine teacher for men, – for all men without distinction of nation or condition, and especially for the lowest, – led to the highest heroic sacrifice – to death on the cross for the salvation of humanity from the power of evil.

== Personal life ==
There was no cleavage between the man and his world. He spoke and acted in all things as he felt and believed and wrote. Kropotkin was a whole man.

— Rudolf Rocker

Kropotkin married Sofia, a Ukrainian Jewish student, in Switzerland in October 1878. She was over a decade younger than Kropotkin. Kropotkin references her as a primary source of criticism and feedback. Her published story, "The Wife of Number 4,237", was based on her own experience with her husband at Clairvaux prison. She created an archive in Moscow dedicated to his works before she died in 1941. Their only child, Alexandra, was born in London in 1887. Kropotkin was reserved about his private life.

As an individual, Kropotkin was known for having exceptional integrity and moral character that matched his beliefs. Henry Hyndman, an ideological adversary, recalled Kropotkin's charm and sincerity. These traits, wrote Stepnyak-Kravchinsky, contributed to Kropotkin's power as a public speaker. As a thinker, Kropotkin focused more acutely on issues of morality than of economics or politics and carried himself according to his own principles without imposition on others. In practice, this made him more of a "revolutionary humanitarian" than a revolutionist by deed. He was also known for being exceptionally kind and for forgoing material comforts to live a revolutionary, principled life by example. Gerald Runkle wrote that "Kropotkin with his scholarly and saintly ways ... almost brought respectability to the movement."

== Legacy ==
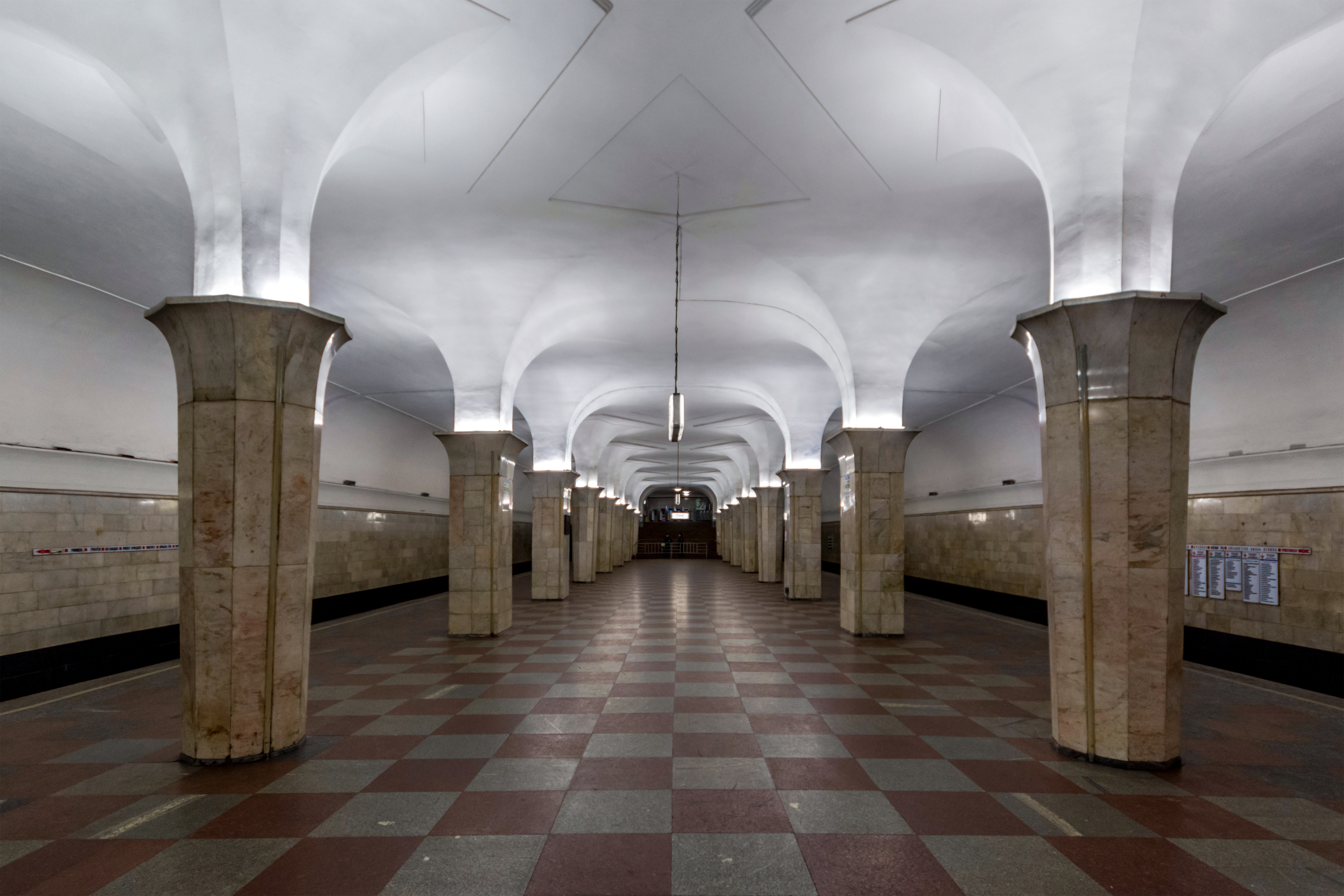
The Kropotkinskaya metro station

As the anarchists' leading theorist in his lifetime, Kropotkin wrote their most systematic doctrine in an accessible way; and led the development of anarchist-communist social doctrine. His works, inventive and pragmatic, were the most read anarchist books and pamphlets, with translations into major European and Eastern languages that influenced revolutionaries (e.g., Nestor Makhno and Emiliano Zapata) and non-anarchist reformers alike (e.g., Patrick Geddes, Ebenezer Howard), as well as a wide range of intellectuals (including the writers Ba Jin and James Joyce). Much of Kropotkin's impact was in his intellectual writings prior to 1914. He had little influence on the Russian Revolution, despite returning for it.

Emma Goldman regarded Kropotkin as her "great teacher" and as among the greatest minds and personalities of the 19th century. Biographer Stephen Osofsky wrote that "Historian Paul Avrich sees Kropotkin as the foremost libertarian theorist and most venerated figure of the anarchist movement ... Historian Alexander Gray maintained that Kropotkin was ... 'probably the most representative, as he is certainly the most attractive and engaging, of the modern anarchists'".

After Kropotkin's 1921 death, the Bolsheviks permitted Kropotkin's Moscow house to become a Kropotkin Museum. It closed during Stalin's reign in 1938 with his wife's death.

Kropotkin is the namesake for multiple regional entities. The Konyushennaya district in Moscow, where Kropotkin was born, is now known by his name, as the Kropotkinsky district, including the Kropotkinskaya metro station. He is the namesake for a large town in the North Caucasus (southwest Russia) and a small town in Siberia. The Kropotkin Range he was first to cross in the Siberian Patom Highlands was named for him, as was a peak in East Antarctica.

== Works ==
=== Books ===
- In Russian and French Prisons, London: Ward and Downey, 1887.
- The Conquest of Bread (Paris, 1892) Project Gutenberg e-text, Project LibriVox audiobook.
- The Great French Revolution, 1789–1793 (French original: Paris, 1893; English translation: London, 1909). e-text (in French), Anarchist Library e-text (in English).
- The State: Its Historic Role, 1896.
- The Terror in Russia, 1909.
- Words of a Rebel, 1885.
- Fields, Factories, and Workshops (London and New York, 1898).
- Memoirs of a Revolutionist, London: Smith, Elder, 1899. Anarchist Library e-text, Anarchy Archives e-text.
- Mutual Aid: A Factor of Evolution (London, 1902) Project Gutenberg e-text, Project LibriVox audiobook.
- Modern Science and Anarchism, 1903.
- Russian Literature: Ideals and Realities (New York: A. A. Knopf, 1905). Anarchy Archives e-text.
- Ethics: Origin and Development (unfinished). Included as first part of Origen y evolución de la moral (Spanish e-text).

=== Pamphlets ===
- An Appeal to the Young (1880)
- Communism and Anarchy Archived 28 January 2018 at the Wayback Machine (1901)
- Anarchist Communism: Its Basis and Principles Archived 11 March 2007 at the Wayback Machine (1887)
- The Industrial Village of the Future Archived 28 January 2018 at the Wayback Machine (1884)
- Law and Authority Archived 9 March 2017 at the Wayback Machine (1886)
- The Coming Anarchy Archived 8 February 2018 at the Wayback Machine (1887)
- The Place of Anarchy in Socialist Evolution Archived 10 November 2016 at the Wayback Machine (1886)
- The Wage System Archived 8 February 2018 at the Wayback Machine (1920)
- The Commune of Paris Archived 8 February 2018 at the Wayback Machine (1880)
- Anarchist Morality Archived 8 February 2018 at the Wayback Machine (1898)
- Expropriation Archived 8 February 2018 at the Wayback Machine
- The Great French Revolution and Its Lesson Archived 5 February 2018 at the Wayback Machine (1909)
- Process Under Socialism Archived 8 February 2018 at the Wayback Machine (1887)
- Are Prisons Necessary? Archived 15 September 2007 at the Wayback Machine Chapter X from "In Russian and French Prisons" (1887)
- The Coming War Archived 8 February 2018 at the Wayback Machine (1913)
- Wars and Capitalism Archived 8 February 2018 at the Wayback Machine (1914)
- Revolutionary Government Archived 9 March 2017 at the Wayback Machine (1892)
- The Scientific Basis of Anarchy Archived 8 February 2018 at the Wayback Machine (1887)
- The Fortress Prison of St. Petersburg Archived 8 February 2018 at the Wayback Machine (1883)
- Advice to Those About to Emigrate Archived 3 January 2018 at the Wayback Machine (1893)
- Some of the Resources of Canada Archived 8 February 2018 at the Wayback Machine (1898)
- Anarchism: Its Philosophy and Ideal Archived 8 August 2007 at the Wayback Machine (1896)
- Revolutionary Studies Archived 8 February 2018 at the Wayback Machine (1892)
- Direct Action of Environment and Evolution Archived 8 February 2018 at the Wayback Machine (1920)
- The Present Crisis in Russia Archived 8 February 2018 at the Wayback Machine (1901)
- The Spirit of Revolt Archived 29 January 2018 at the Wayback Machine (1880)
- The State: Its Historic Role Archived 7 July 2007 at the Wayback Machine (1897)
- On Economics Archived 16 July 2007 at the Wayback Machine Selected Passages from his Writings (1898–1913)
- On the Teaching of Physiography Archived 8 February 2018 at the Wayback Machine (1893)
- War! Archived 9 March 2017 at the Wayback Machine (1914)

=== Articles ===
- "The Constitutional Agitation in Russia", Archived 4 February 2018 at the Wayback Machine 1905.
- "Brain Work and Manual Work", Archived 4 February 2018 at the Wayback Machine 1890.
- "Manifesto of the Sixteen", Archived 4 February 2018 at the Wayback Machine 1916.
- "Organized Vengeance Called 'Justice.'" Archived 4 February 2018 at the Wayback Machine
- "A Proposed Communist Settlement: A New Colony for Tyneside or Wearside". Archived 4 February 2018 at the Wayback Machine
- "What Geography Ought to Be", Archived 4 February 2018 at the Wayback Machine 1885.
- "On Order" Archived 5 February 2018 at the Wayback Machine
- "Maxím Górky", Archived 5 February 2018 at the Wayback Machine 1904
- "Research on the Ice age", Notices of the Imperial Russian Geographical Society, 1876.
- "Baron Toll", The Geographical Journal, Vol. 23, No. 6. (Jun. 1904), pp. 770–772, JSTOR Archived 13 April 2016 at the Wayback Machine
- "The population of Russia", The Geographical Journal, Vol. 10, No. 2. (Aug. 1897), pp. 196–202, JSTOR Archived 8 March 2016 at the Wayback Machine
- "The old beds of the Amu-Daria", The Geographical Journal, Vol. 12, No. 3. (Sep. 1898), pp. 306–310, JSTOR Archived 24 March 2016 at the Wayback Machine
- "Russian Schools and the Holy Synod", Archived 4 February 2018 at the Wayback Machine 1902
- Mr. Mackinder; Mr. Ravenstein; Dr. Herbertson; Prince Kropotkin; Mr. Andrews; Cobden Sanderson; Elisée Reclus, "On Spherical Maps and Reliefs: Discussion", The Geographical Journal, Vol. 22, No. 3. (Sep. 1903), pp. 294–299, JSTOR Archived 9 March 2017 at the Wayback Machine
- "The desiccation of Eur-Asia", Geographical Journal, 23 (1904), 722–41.
- "Finland" in Encyclopædia Britannica (11th ed.), 1911 (in part; with Joseph R. Fisher and John Scott Keltie)
- "Finland: A Rising Nationality", Archived 4 February 2018 at the Wayback Machine Nineteenth Century, 1885
- "Anarchism" Archived 25 April 2020 at the Wayback Machine in Encyclopædia Britannica (11th ed.), 1911
- "Anti-militarism. Was it properly understood?" Archived 29 November 2016 at the Wayback Machine, Freedom, vol.XXVIII, no. 307 (November 1914), pp. 82–83.
- "An open letter of Peter Kropotkin to the Western workingmen" Archived 29 November 2016 at the Wayback Machine, The Railway Review (29 June 1917), p. 4.

== See also ==
- Maria Leshern von Herzfeld
- Golets Kropotkin

== Bibliography ==
- Avrich, Paul (1988). Anarchist Portraits. Princeton, New Jersey: Princeton University Press. pp. 53–106. ISBN 0-691-04753-7. OCLC 17727270.
- Cahm, Caroline (1989). Kropotkin and the Rise of Revolutionary Anarchism 1872–1886. Cambridge University Press. ISBN 0-521-36445-0. OCLC 19553164.
- Crowder, George (2003). "Petr Alekseevich Kropotkin". In Dinega, Alyssa W. (ed.). Russian Literature in the Age of Realism. Vol. 277. Detroit, MI: Gale. pp. 191–198. Gale OOSVCP062651800.
- Eisenzweig, Uri (2001). Fictions de l'anarchisme [Fictions of anarchism] (in French). France: C. Bourgois. ISBN 2-267-01570-6.
- Green, Lara (2022). "The Transnational Life and Death of Peter Kropotkin, 1881-1921: Terrorism, the Anarchist Body, and the Russian Revolution". Anarchist Studies. 30 (1): 83–. ISSN 0967-3393. Gale A708386012.
- Marshall, Peter (1992). "Peter Kropotkin: The Revolutionary Evolutionist". Demanding the Impossible: A History of Anarchism. London: HarperCollins. pp. 309–338. ISBN 978-0-00-217855-6.
- Nettlau, Max (2011). Histoire de l'anarchie. Translated by Martin-Zemliak. Paris: Laville Éditions. ISBN 979-1090134027.
- Osofsky, Stephen (1979). Peter Kropotkin. Boston: Twayne Publishers. ISBN 978-0-8057-7724-6. OCLC 4497420.
- Kropotkin, Peter; Walter, Nicolas (1971). Memoirs of a Revolutionist. New York: Dover. ISBN 978-0-486-22485-5.
- Woodcock, George (1986). "The Explorer". Anarchism: A History of Libertarian Ideas and Movements (2nd ed.). Harmondsworth: Penguin Books. pp. 153–182. ISBN 978-0-14-022697-3. OCLC 489971695.
