= Alexander Kropotkin =

Prince Alexander Alexeevich Kropotkin (Russian: Алекса́ндр Алексе́евич Кропо́ткин, 1841–1886) was a Russian mathematician and populariser of astronomy, and was the brother of the anarchist theorist Pyotr Alexeevich Kropotkin.

== Biography ==
Alexander Kropotkin was born in 1841 into the family of Major General Alexei Petrovich Kropotkin (1805–1871).

He was the second youngest boy of four children. His brother Pyotr was a year younger, and another brother, Nicholas, and a sister, Helen, were older. His father was a royal officer who owned serfs in three provinces and whose family descended from the princes of Smolensk. His mother, Ekatarina Sulima, was the daughter of General Nikolai Sulima and a descendant of a Zaporozhian Cossack leader.

His mother died of tuberculosis when he was about six and a half years of age. Kropotkin's father remarried two years later, to Yelizaveta Mar'kovna Korandino. The stepmother was indifferent towards the Kropotkin children and had a streak of jealous vindictiveness, going through great lengths to remove the memory of Kropotkin's mother.

Alexander Kropotkin published articles on astronomy and celestial mechanics in "Russkoye Bogatstvo" and in specialized French and English journals, and was a journalist who wrote for the Siberian press.

He became radicalised as a follower of Pyotr Lavrov.

On his return from Europe to Russia in 1876, he was arrested by the police. The conclusion of the head of the Third Section on his case stated that he was not guilty as provided for by the law on punishment for political crimes, but he had demonstrated an "extremely harmful" way of thinking, and therefore his case was resolved not by a judicial but by an administrative procedure. He was accused of helping his brother Peter, who had escaped from the Peter and Paul Fortress and was living abroad, for which he was exiled to Tomsk Oblast until 3 September 1886. (29 August [O.S. 9 September] 1886 in another source.) He participated in the publication of the newspaper "Sibirsky Vestnik" ("Siberian Herald").

Before the end of his exile, his wife and three young children were sent to relatives in Kharkov Oblast, where he intended to go from Siberia. However, on 6 August [O.S. 25 July] 1886, at about nine o'clock in the evening, Kropotkin shot himself with a revolver. One source states that although "after the departure of his family, he began to lead an irregular life, he had no motive to take his own life" -however, another source suggests that a refusal of compassionate prison leave to visit one of his children, reported to be dying, may have been a factor.

Afterwards, Alexander Kropotkin's ailing widow (who was left with three small children to care for) was nursed back to health by Sophie Kropotkin, her sister-in-law, in London.

== Family and children ==
- Wife — Vera ('Faith') Sevastyanovna Berynda-Tchaikovsky (1849–1935).
- Son — Nikolai Alexandrovich Kropotkin (1878–1949).
- Grandson — Pyotr Nikolaevich Kropotkin (1910–1996).

== Literature ==
- "Kropotkin, Alexander Alexandrovich", Brockhaus and Efron Encyclopedic Dictionary: in 86 volumes (82 volumes and 4 add.). — St. Petersburg, 1890-1907
- Milevsky O. A. (2017), "The Story of One Shot: A. A. Kropotkin's Suicide", Bulletin of Tomsk State University. History, vol. 46, pp. 5–12
- Osofsky, Stephen (1979), Peter Kropotkin, Boston: Twayne Publishers, ISBN 978-0-8057-7724-6, OCLC 4497420
- "Russians in London: Pyotr Kropotkin". Dr Sarah J. Young. 9 January 2011.
