= Memoirs of a Revolutionist =

1899 autobiography by Peter Kropotkin

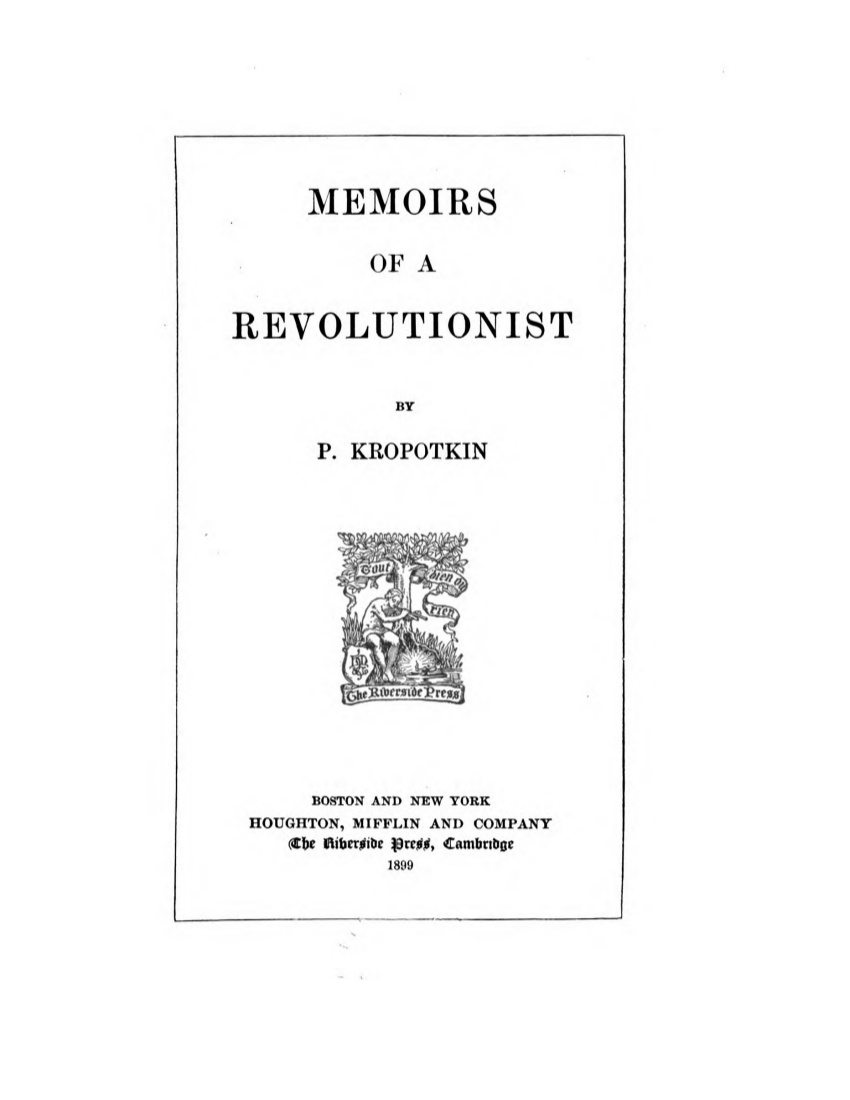
- Author: Peter Kropotkin
- Subject: Autobiography
- Published: 1899 (Houghton Mifflin)

Memoirs of a Revolutionist is an autobiography written by Russian anarchist philosopher Peter Kropotkin.

== Summary ==
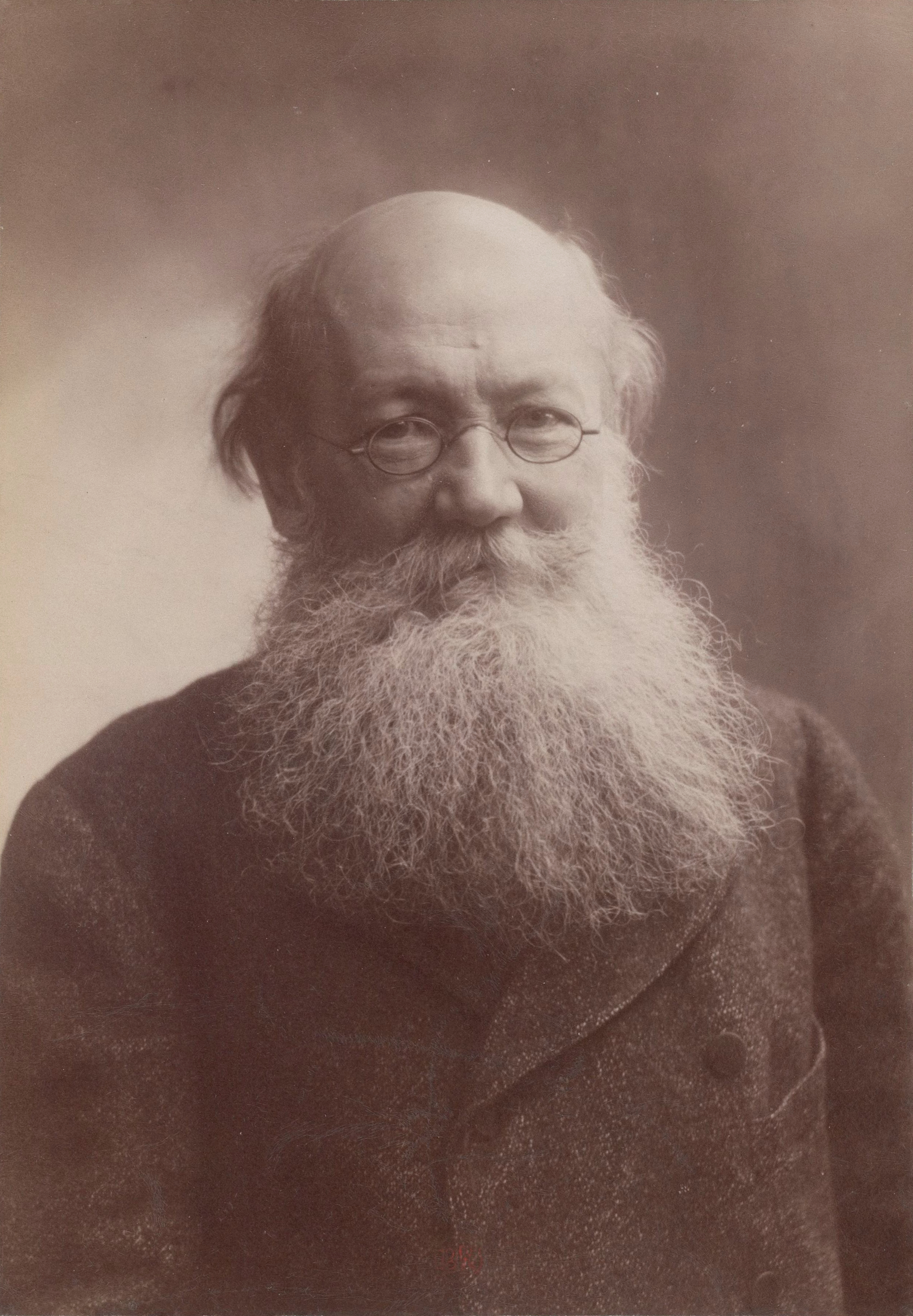
Kropotkin, c. 1900

Kropotkin's Memoirs address the arc of his life, the development of his anarchist philosophy, and his activism for socialist causes. It covers his childhood, cadet corps schooling, geographical work, political awakening, international travel, and Chaykovsky Circle work. He discusses his exile and activism in Western Europe after escaping from a Russian jail.

== Publication history ==
Elements of what would become Kropotkin's Memoirs of a Revolutionist were first published in The Atlantic Monthly between 1898 and 1899 in English, the same year it received its first publication from Houghton Mifflin with an introduction by Georg Brandes. Later editions of this original 1899 release include those edited and introduced by James Allen Rodgers (Doubleday, 1962) and Nicolas Walter (Dover Publications, 1971). Both use endnotes to address Kropotkin's subsequent Russian-language additions in the translation of his Memoirs.

After its initial release, Kropotkin continued to revise his Memoirs with Russian-language additions in a translation of the 1902 English release. These were published in multiple editions between 1906 and 1929. The canonical 1933 Soviet Academia edition derived from Kropotkin's Russian manuscript and became the basis for Soviet reprints.

A reviewer of the English editions in The Slavonic and East European Review remarked that the memoirs remained readable and interesting in the present day. While he praised the editors' extensive notes and sufficient indices, he felt that ready footnotes (on page bottom) would have been more appropriate than endnotes for putting Kropotkin's additions in context, and that the 1933 Russian edition's illustrations would have been worthwhile imports.

== See also ==
- List of books about anarchism
