= Le Révolté =

Anarcho-communist journal

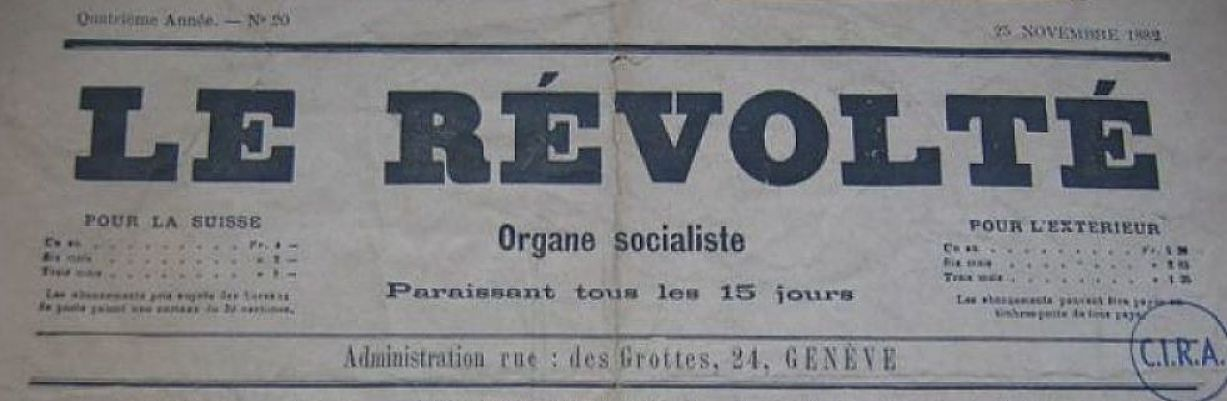
- Frequency: Bi-monthly
- First issue: February 1879
- Final issue: March 14, 1885
- Language: French

Le Révolté was an anarcho-communist journal started by Peter Kropotkin, along with François Dumartheray and Georg Herzig, in February 1879. The journal was partially funded by Elisée Reclus, Kropotkin's mentor. At the time of the journal's founding, Reclus and Kropotkin were living in the village of Clarens on Lake Geneva. The journal itself was published in Geneva.

After Kropotkin was expelled from Switzerland and convicted in the Lyon trial of 1883 (for belonging to a defunct organization, i.e., The International), Le Révolté needed a new editor. Elisée Reclus, who had become quite friendly with Jean Grave, recommended Grave for the editorship and, after some hesitation, Grave accepted and moved to Geneva in 1883. Due to difficulties in getting the journal into France as well as Swiss police harassment, in 1885 Grave moved back to France with the journal. The last issue of Le Révolté was 14 March 1885. In 1887 the journal became La Révolte. The switch to La Révolte resulted from a desperate and ineffective effort to avoid legal responsibility for a fine assessed the journal for participating in an illegal lottery in support of military desertion. Le Révolté was issued semimonthly before May 1886 and afterwards was a four-page weekly. The journal's circulation in 1886 was about 4,000 and by 1889 had grown to 6,000. After 1895, the journal was named Les Temps Nouveaux; it ceased publication in 1914.
