= Murray Bookchin bibliography =

List of works by Murray Bookchin

This is a list of works by Murray Bookchin (1921–2006). For a more complete list, please see the Bookchin bibliography compiled by Janet Biehl.

== Books ==
- Our Synthetic Environment (1962, as Lewis Herber)
- Crisis in Our Cities (1965, as Lewis Herber)
- Post-Scarcity Anarchism (1971)
  - Essay collection including "Ecology and Revolutionary Thought", "Towards a Liberatory Technology", "Desire and Need", and "Listen, Marxist!"
- The Spanish Anarchists (1976)
- Toward an Ecological Society (1980)
- The Ecology of Freedom (1982)
- The Modern Crisis (1986) ISBN 9780865710849
- The Limits of the City (1974, 2nd ed. 1986)
- The Rise of Urbanization and the Decline of Citizenship (1987)
  - Urbanization without Cities: The Rise and Decline of Citizenship (1992)
  - From Urbanization to Cities: Towards a New Politics of Citizenship (1995)
- Remaking Society (1990)
- To Remember Spain: The Anarchist and Syndicalist Revolution of 1936 (1994) ISBN 9781873176870
- The Philosophy of Social Ecology (1995)
- Re-Enchanting Humanity: A Defense of the Human Spirit Against Antihumanism, Misanthropy, Mysticism, and Primitivism (1995) ISBN 9780304328390
- Social Anarchism or Lifestyle Anarchism (1995)
- Considering the Third Revolution: Popular Movements in the Revolutionary Era (1996, 1998)
- Anarchism, Marxism and the Future of the Left: Interviews and Essays, 1993–1998 (1999) ISBN 9781873176351
- Social Ecology and Communalism (2007) ISBN 9781904859499
- The Next Revolution: Popular Assemblies and the Promise of Direct Democracy (2015)

== Books about Bookchin ==
- Janet Biehl, ed., The Murray Bookchin Reader (1999)
- Janet Biehl, The Politics of Social Ecology: Libertarian Municipalism (1998) ISBN 9781551641003
- Bob Black, Anarchy After Leftism (1997) ISBN 978-18905320-00
- Andy Price, Recovering Bookchin: Social Ecology and the Crises of Our Time (2012)
- Janet Biehl, Ecology or Catastrophe: The Life of Murray Bookchin (2015)
- Yavor Tarinski, ed., Enlightenment and Ecology: The Legacy of Murray Bookchin in the 21st Century (2021) ISBN 978-1-55164-709-8
- Damian White, Bookchin: A Critical Appraisal (2008) ISBN 978-0745319650
