= Pennyville, Johannesburg =

Suburb in Gauteng, South Africa

Coordinates: 26.2063°S 27.9528°E

Pennyville

Pennyville is an infill development, located very close to the N1 Western Bypass, near Roodepoort. A vacant and narrow strip of land was used to create a medium-density housing, which included multi-story flats, two-storey walk-ups, and semi-detached houses. The housing was established by the state's social housing development project, which has a mandate to build inclusive and sustainable dwellings. Currently, this mixed-use residential area consists of 800 units and upon completion, is intended to yield 3 200 housing units. Pennyville is located approximately 10 km southwest of the Johannesburg Central Business District. The area also benefits from public transportation services, with a PUTCO bus depot providing connectivity to other parts of Johannesburg and the recently reopened New Canada Railway Station.

== Community and amenities ==
Pennyville is home to various community facilities, including the Pennyville Satellite Library Service, a container that is open two days a week, which serves as an educational resource for local residents.

== Social unrest ==
In 2019, protests erupted as residents demanded that low-cost social housing units be provided for free, citing issues with inflated rental prices and maintenance concerns. Additionally, some residents have reported health concerns due to the construction of flats on former mine dumps, highlighting the need for comprehensive urban planning and environmental considerations.
