= Janet Biehl =

American writer (born 1953)

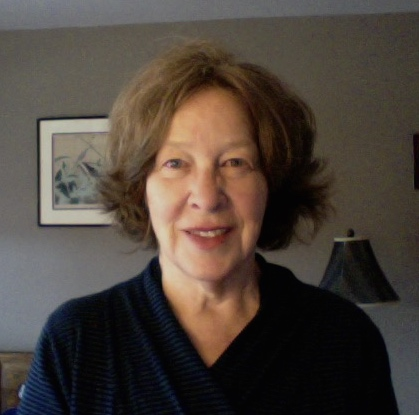
- Biehl in 2014
- Born: September 4, 1953 (age 73)
- Education: Wesleyan University
- Writing career
- Language: English
- Subject: Social ecology

Janet Biehl (born September 4, 1953) is an American author, copyeditor, translator, and artist. She authored several books and articles associated with social ecology, the body of ideas developed and publicized by Murray Bookchin. Formerly an advocate of his antistatist political program, she broke with it publicly in 2011 and now identifies as a progressive Democrat.

Since the early 1980s she has earned her living as a freelance copyeditor for New York book publishers including Random House, Knopf Doubleday, W.W. Norton, and Farrar Straus & Giroux. She is also a graphic artist and illustrator.

== Education ==
Biehl grew up in Cincinnati, Ohio, and attended Wesleyan University, graduating in 1974 as a theater major. She studied acting as well as set and costume design at the Eugene O'Neill Theater Center. She then moved to New York City, where she appeared in off-off-Broadway productions, including the world premiere of Fefu and Her Friends by Maria Irene Fornes.

Biehl studied drawing and watercolor painting at the Art Students League of New York. In 1985 she enrolled at the CUNY Graduate Center, where she earned an M.A. in liberal studies.

== Social ecology ==
In 1986 she attended the Institute for Social Ecology, in Vermont, where she met the social theorist Murray Bookchin. In January 1987 she moved to Burlington, Vermont, to study further with Bookchin. They began a collaborative relationship to develop and promote social ecology.

From 1987 to 2003 they co-wrote and co-published the theoretical newsletter Green Perspectives, later renamed Left Green Perspectives. Biehl edited and compiled The Murray Bookchin Reader (1997), which Bookchin considered to be the best introduction to his work. To summarize Bookchin's ideas on assembly democracy, known as libertarian municipalism, she wrote The Politics of Social Ecology: Libertarian Municipalism (1998). She wrote numerous articles about or related to Bookchin's ideas.

After Bookchin's death in 2006, she spent several years researching and writing Ecology or Catastrophe: The Life of Murray Bookchin. It was published in 2015 by Oxford University Press. In 2011 Biehl separated from social ecology, explaining that she could no longer advocate an antistatist ideology. In 2016 she wrote "The Limits of Municipalism" with regard to current political events in the United States.

== Kurdish freedom movement ==
After the Kurdish freedom movement leader Abdullah Öcalan, leader of the insurgent Kurdistan Workers' Party, was captured and imprisoned in 1999, he became an avid reader of Bookchin's work in Turkish translation and recommended it to the movement. Drawing in part on Bookchin's ideas, he formulated democratic confederalism as a political program, which the PKK adopted. In 2004 several intermediaries tried to arrange a dialogue between Bookchin and Öcalan but were unsuccessful due to Bookchin's failing health.

In 2011 Biehl attended and spoke at a conference in Diyarbakir hosted by the Mesopotamian Ecology Movement. That marked the beginning of her involvement with the Kurdish movement.

In 2012 Biehl translated (from German to English) the book Democratic Autonomy in North Kurdistan by the solidarity group TATORT Kurdistan. The book is a field study of democratic institutions built by the Kurdish movement in southeastern Turkey to implement democratic confederalism.

In 2014 and 2015, she visited Rojava, the multiethnic region of northeastern Syria where many Kurds live and where the Kurdish movement implemented democratic confederalism, gender equality, and ecology. Both times she was part of a delegation of observers to witness the social changes under way there. She published several articles about her visits.

She then translated (German to English) Revolution in Rojava: Democratic Autonomy and Women's Liberation in Northern Syria, written by Michael Knapp, Anja Flach, and Ercan Ayboga. This early broad field study of the revolution was published in October 2016 by Pluto Press.

Thereafter she translated two volumes of the memoir of Sakine Cansız, a co-founder of the PKK in 1978 and progenitor of today's strong Kurdish women's movement.They were published as SARA by Pluto Press.

In the spring of 2019 Biehl returned to Rojava, now called the Autonomous Administration of North and East Syria, to participate in an independent documentary film about the ongoing social revolution. She wrote and drew about the experience in her graphic memoir Their Blood Got Mixed: Revolutionary Rojava and the War on ISIS, which was published by PM Press in 2022. The film, Threads of a Revolution, is directed by Danny Mitchell and Ross Domoney. It had its world premiere at the Middlebury New Filmmakers Festival in August 2024 and was screened that fall at the New York Kurdish Film Festival's 8th edition.

In 2022 she collaborated with Emek Ergun and Ruken Isik to coordinate the English translation (from Turkish) of The Purple Color of Kurdish Politics, a multiauthored book about women's struggle for equality within the Kurdish political party tradition, as well as women's transformation of that tradition. The original had been edited by Gültan Kışanak while she was detained in a Turkish prison and was published in Turkish. The English translation upon which Biehl collaborated was published by Pluto Press.

As of 2023 Biehl is a board member and website content editor for the New York Kurdish Cultural Center. In 2026 she co-founded, with Eric Agnero, the media platform Global South Watch, to boost journalistic coverage of parts of the world neglected by the mainstream press and to amplify less-heard voices. She serves as editor in chief of GSW's YouTube channel and website.

== Selected works ==
- Finding Our Way: Rethinking Ecofeminist Politics. Montreal: Black Rose Books. 1991. ISBN 0921689780.
- Ecofascism: Lessons from the German Experience. Edinburgh and San Francisco: AK Press. 1995. ISBN 1873176732.
- (Editor) The Murray Bookchin Reader. London: Cassell. 1997. ISBN 0304338745.
- The Politics of Social Ecology: Libertarian Municipalism. Montreal: Black Rose Books. 1998. ISBN 1551641003.
- Mumford Gutkind Bookchin: The Emergence of Eco-decentralism. Porsgrunn, Norway: New Compass. 2011. ISBN 9788293064107.
- (Translator) Democratic Autonomy in North Kurdistan: A Reconnaissance into Southeastern Turkey: The Council Movement, Gender Liberation, and Ecology--in Practice. Porsgrunn, Norway: New Compass. 2013. ISBN 9788293064268.
- Ecology or Catastrophe: The Life of Murray Bookchin. New York: Oxford University Press. 2015. ISBN 978-0199342488.
- (Translator) Revolution in Rojava: Democratic Autonomy and Women's Liberation in Northern Syria. London: Pluto Press. 2016. ISBN 978-0745336596.
- (Translator) Sara: My Whole Life Was a Struggle. London: Pluto Press. 2018. ISBN 978-0745338019.
- (Translator) Sara: Prison Memoir of a Kurdish Revolutionary. London: Pluto Press. 2019. ISBN 978-0745339832.
- (Author and illustrator) Their Blood Got Mixed: A Graphic Journey to the Multiethnic Democracy in Northeast Syria. Oakland, California: PM Press. 2021. ISBN 9781629639444.
- (Translation co-coordinator, illustrator) The Purple Color of Kurdish Politics: Women Politicians Write from Prison. London: Pluto Press. 2022.
