= Mokonyane =

Mokonyane is a South African surname. Notable people with the surname include:

- Dan Mokonyane (1930–2010), South African political revolutionary, writer, and academic
- Nomvula Mokonyane (born 1963), South African politician
