= Democratic confederalism =

Political ideology and government structure

Flag of the KCK, often used by Democratic Confederalists

Democratic confederalism (Kurdish: Konfederalîzma demokratîk), also known as Kurdish communalism, Öcalanism, or Apoism, (Note: Followers of Öcalan and members of the PKK are known by his diminutive name as Apocu (Apo-ites), and his movement is known as Apoculuk (Apoism).) is a political concept theorized by the Kurdistan Workers Party (PKK) leader Abdullah Öcalan about a system of democratic self-organization with the features of a confederation based on the principles of autonomy, direct democracy, political ecology, women's liberation ("Jineology"), multiculturalism, self-defense, self-governance, and elements of a cooperative economy. Influenced by social ecology, libertarian municipalism, Middle Eastern history, and general state theory, Öcalan presents the concept as a political solution to Kurdish national aspirations and other fundamental problems in countries in the region deeply rooted in class society, and as a route to freedom and democratization for people around the world.

Although the liberation struggle of the PKK was originally guided by the prospect of creating a Kurdish nation state on a Marxist–Leninist basis, Öcalan became disillusioned with the nation-state model and state socialism. Influenced by ideas from Western thinkers such as the libertarian municipalist and anarchist Murray Bookchin, Öcalan reformulated the political objectives of the Kurdish liberation movement, abandoning the old statist and centralizing socialist project for a radical and renewed proposal for a form of libertarian socialism that no longer aims at building an independent state separate from Turkey, but at establishing an autonomous, democratic and decentralized entity based on the ideas of democratic confederalism.

== Theory ==
Rejecting both the authoritarianism and bureaucratism of state socialism and the predation of capitalism, seen by Öcalan as most responsible for the economic inequalities, sexism and environmental destruction in the world, democratic confederalism defends a "type of organization or administration [which] can be called non-state political administration or stateless democracy", which would provide the framework for the autonomous organization of "every community, confederal group, gender specific collective and/or minority ethnic group, among other". It is a model of libertarian socialism and participatory democracy built on the self-government of local communities and the organization of open councils, town councils, local parliaments, and larger congresses, where citizens are the agents of self-government, allowing individuals and communities to exercise a real influence over their common environment and activities. Inspired by the struggle of women in the PKK, democratic confederalism has women's liberation as one of its central pillars. Seeing patriarchy as "an ideological product of the national state and power" no less dangerous than capitalism, Öcalan advocates a new vision of society to dismantle the institutional and psychological relations of power currently established in capitalist societies and to ensure that women have a vital and equal role to that of men at all levels of organization and decision-making. It is debated whether or not Jineology is a part of the feminist movement. Other key principles of democratic confederalism are environmentalism, multiculturalism (religious, political, ethnic and cultural), individual freedoms (such as those of expression, choice and information), self-defense, and a sharing economy where control of economic resources does not belong to the state, but to society. Although it presents itself as a model opposed to the nation-state, democratic confederalism admits the possibility, under specific circumstances, of peaceful coexistence between both, as long as there is no intervention by the state in the central issues of self-government or attempts at cultural assimilation. Although it was theorized initially as a new social and ideological basis for the Kurdish liberation movement, democratic confederalism is now presented as an anti-nationalist, multi-ethnic and internationalist movement.

The general lines of democratic confederalism were presented in March 2005, through a declaration "to the Kurdish people and the international community" and, in later years, the concept was further developed in other publications, such as the four volumes of the Manifesto of Democratic Civilization. Shortly after being released, the declaration was immediately adopted by the PKK, which organized clandestine assemblies in Turkey, Syria and Iraq, which resulted in the creation of the Kurdistan Communities Union (Koma Civakên Kurdistan, KCK). The first chance to implement it came during the Syrian civil war, when the Democratic Union Party (Partiya Yekîtiya Demokrat, PYD) declared the autonomy of three cantons in Syrian Kurdistan that eventually grew into the Autonomous Administration of North and East Syria.

== History ==
=== Background ===
Created in the 1970s under the context of Cold War geopolitical bipolarity, the Kurdistan Workers' Party (PKK) was initially inspired by national liberation movements across the planet, many of whom were influenced by Marxist–Leninist ideals and left-wing nationalism. Over the years, however, the PKK has distanced itself from these ideologies, considering that the Kurdish question was not a mere problem of ethnicity and nationality (Note: In his book "In defense of the people" (published in German in 2010), Öcalan wrote that "The development of authority and hierarchy even before the class society emerged is a significant turning point in history", adding that "no law of nature requires natural societies to develop into hierarchical state-based societies" and judging "the Marxist belief that class society is an inevitability" to be deeply mistaken.) solved by the revolutionary seizure of state power or the constitution of an independent state. Becoming a major critic of the very idea of a nation-state and even of national and social liberation from a Marxist–Leninist perspective, Abdullah Öcalan initiated a substantial transition from the Kurdish liberation movement in search of a form of socialism distinct from the statist and centralizing system associated with the former Soviet superpower.

This process was consolidated after the capture and arrest of Öcalan by the Turkish intelligence services in 1999. Although he is kept in isolation on the prison island of İmralı, Öcalan used his time not only to prepare his defense strategy in the course of the Turkish trial which had sentenced him to death, but also to elaborate his proposals on the Kurdish question and on its political solution. Having access to hundreds of books, including Turkish translations of numerous historical and philosophical texts from Western thought, his plan was initially to find theoretical foundations in these works that would justify the PKK's past actions, and to discuss the Kurdish–Turkish conflict within a comprehensive analysis of the development of the nation-state throughout history. Thus, Öcalan began his studies from Sumerian mythology and the origins of Neolithic cultures, as well as from the history of the first city-states. But it was the readings of thinkers like Friedrich Nietzsche (whom Öcalan calls "the prophet of the capitalist era"), Fernand Braudel, Immanuel Wallerstein, Maria Mies, Michel Foucault, and particularly Murray Bookchin, (Note: Öcalan had read The Ecology of Freedom, and agreed with Bookchin's analysis. Looking for theoretical guidance, the Kurdish leader asked to Reimar Heider, his German translator, to send an e-mail to Bookchin. Sent in April 2004, the message told him that Öcalan had been reading Turkish translations of Bookchin's books in prison and considered himself a "good student" of his works. Also, Öcalan "has recommended Bookchin's books to every mayor in all Kurdish cities and wanted everybody to read them." Bookchin and Öcalan corresponded for a while, but the philosopher died in 2006.), that led him to a definitive break with the Marxist–Leninist socialist perspective and develops a new proposal for a system called "democratic confederalism".

In 2005, while the European Court of Human Rights condemned Turkey for "inhumane treatment" and "unfair prosecution" in the case of Öcalan, calling for a new trial for the Kurdish leader, Öcalan issued "Declaration of Democratic Confederalism in Kurdistan", where he laid the groundwork of democratic confederalism. Later, the concept was further developed and presented in works such as Democratic Confederalism and Manifesto of Democratic Civilization (the latter in four volumes).

Democratic confederalism of Kurdistan is not a state system, but a democratic system of the people without a state. With the women and youth at the forefront, it is a system in which all sectors of society will develop their own democratic organisations. It is a politics exercised by free and equal confederal citizens by electing their own free regional representatives. It is based on the principle of its own strength and expertise. It derives its power from the people and in all areas including its economy it will seek self-sufficiency.

— Abdullah Öcalan, Declaration of Democratic Confederalism in Kurdistan, 2005.

=== Concept ===
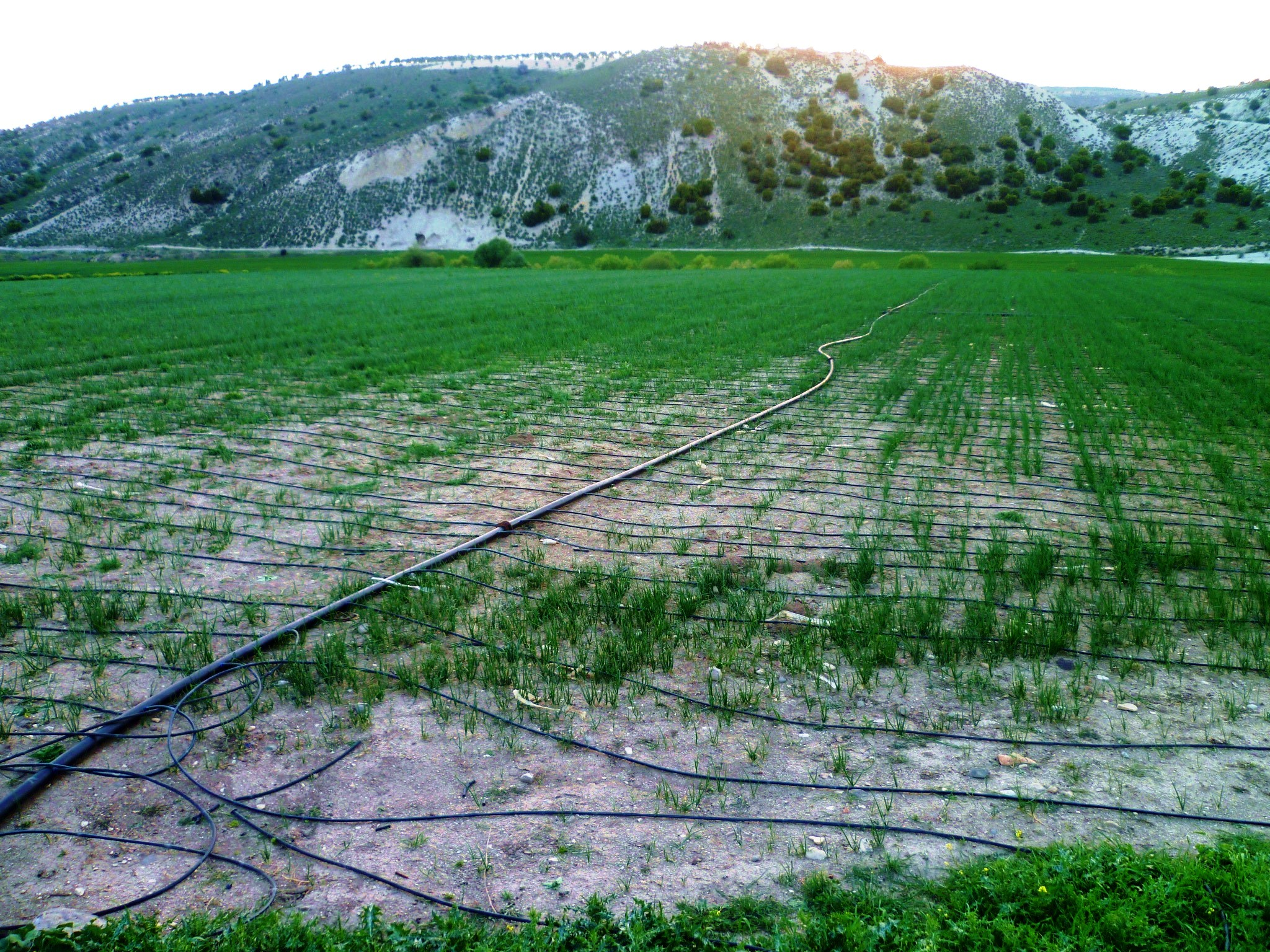
Sustainable micro-irrigation system in Syria created by the AANES in southern Afrin.

Responding to the needs of the Kurdish movement across Kurdistan, Öcalan's studies resulting in democratic confederalism addressed various aspects of Kurdish society in the fields of anthropology, linguistics, and international politics, international law, as well as introducing a women's liberation ideology called Jineology, the latter in particular having been inspired by the struggle of women in the PKK and Sakine Cansiz. His greatest theoretical inspirations came from social ecology and libertarian municipalism as formulated by the American anarchist Murray Bookchin. In his works, Bookchin argues that the domination and destruction of nature is the continuation of the domination of human beings by each other, including through the forms of capitalism and the nation-state. Establishing a connection between the ecological crisis and social hierarchy, the American philosopher observes that the social structure of humanity needs to be rethought and transformed from a destructive hierarchical society to an ecological social society that maintains a balance between its parts and whose communities can organize their lives independently.

YBŞ and PKK Guerrillas
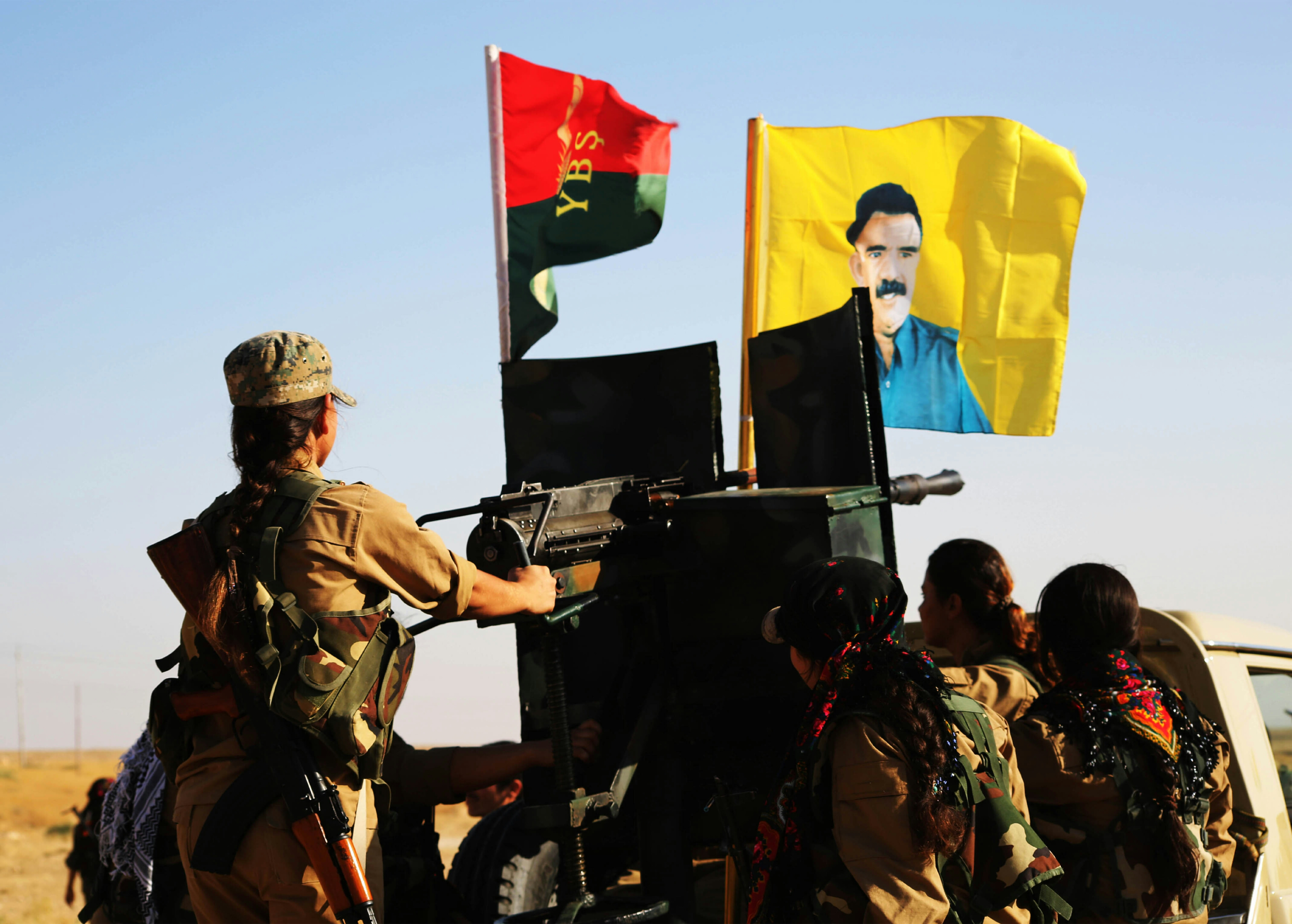
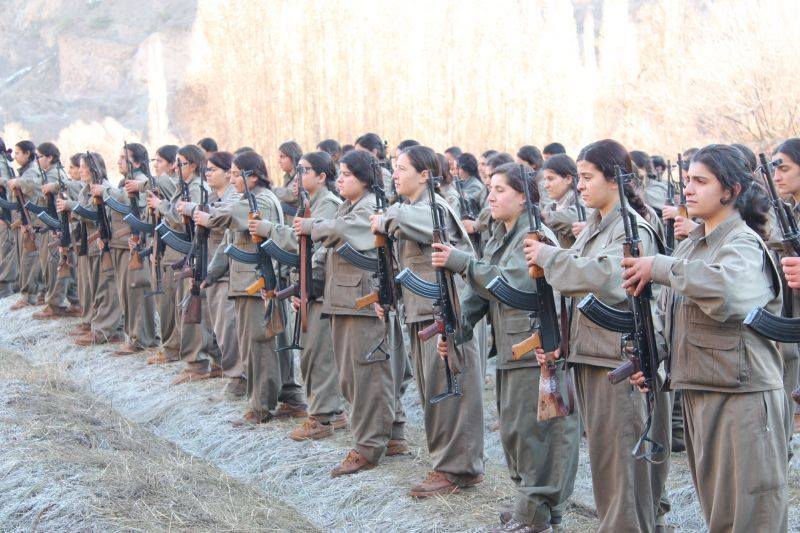
YBŞ and PKK Guerillas in Northern and Southern Kurdistan in 2017

Admiring Bookchin's concepts, Öcalan developed a critical view of nationalism and the nation-state that led him to interpret peoples' right to self-determination as "the basis for the establishment of a basic democracy, without the need to seek new political frontiers". Based on this, Öcalan proposes that a political solution for the Kurdish people does not involve the foundation of a new national state, but the constitution of a democratic, decentralized and autonomous system of self-organization in the form of a confederation.

I offer the Turkish society a simple solution. We demand a democratic nation. We are not opposed to the unitary state and republic. We accept the republic, its unitary structure and laicism. However, we believe that it must be redefined as a democratic state respecting peoples, cultures and rights. On this basis, the Kurds must be free to organize in a way that they can live their culture and language and can develop economically and ecologically. This would allow Kurds, Turks and other cultures to come together under the roof of a democratic nation in Turkey. This is only possible, though, with a democratic constitution and an advanced legal framework warranting respect for different cultures. Our idea of a democratic nation is not defined by flags and borders. Our idea of a democratic nation embraces a model based on democracy instead of a model based on state structures and ethnic origins. Turkey needs to define itself as a country which includes all ethnic groups. This would be a model based on human rights instead of religion or race. Our idea of a democratic nation embraces all ethnic groups and cultures.

— Abdullah Öcalan, War and peace in Kurdistan, 2008.

==== Main points ====
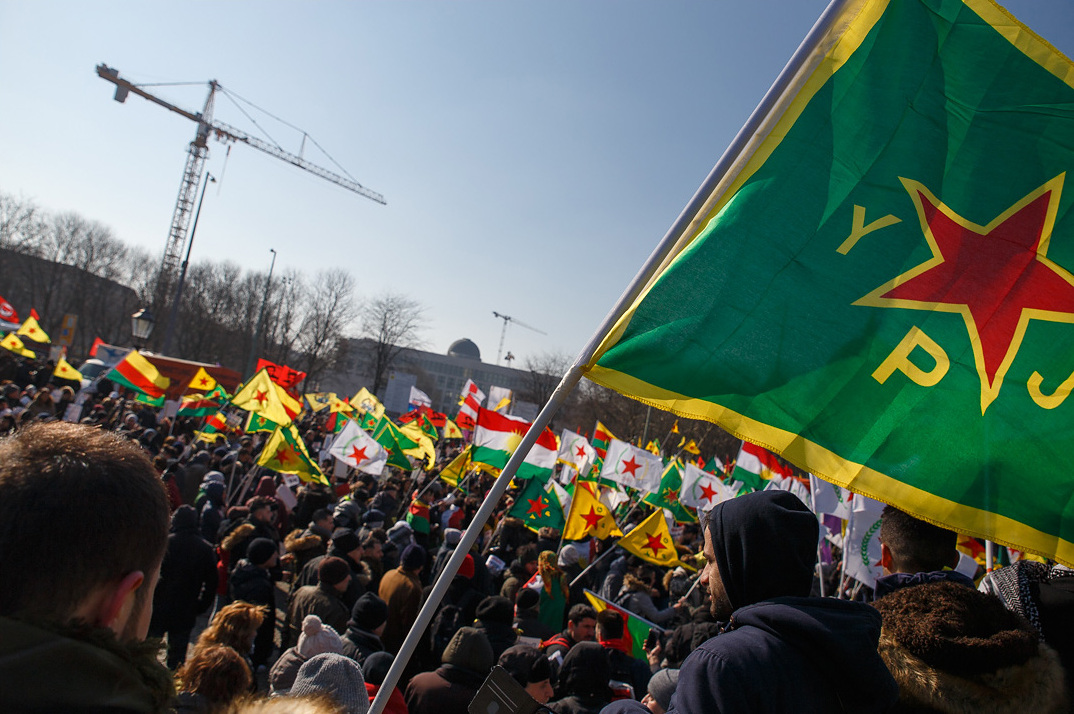
Protest in support of Democratic confederalism and the Rojava revolution against genocide, in Berlin, Germany 2018

The main principles of democratic confederalism can be summarized in:

- The new political, philosophical and ideological approaches of the Kurdish liberation movement finds its most appropriate expression in the so-called democratic socialism. A free Kurdistan is only conceivable as a democratic Kurdistan.
- The Kurdish movement does not work for creating a Kurdish nation-state based on the right of self-determination of peoples, but considers this right "as the basis for the establishment of grassroots democracies" without aiming new political borders and is seeking to a system of democratic self-organization in Kurdistan with the features of a confederation that "provides a frame-work within which inter alia minorities, religious communities, cultural groups, gender-specific groups and other societal groups" can organize themselves autonomously.
- The democratization process in Kurdistan encompasses "a broad societal project aiming at the economic, social and political sovereignty of all parts of the society", as well as the creation of necessary institutions and the elaboration of instruments that guarantee and enable society self-government and democratic control, in which each decision-making process (organized in open councils, municipal councils, local and general parliaments) should have the direct involvement of local communities. A self-government model allow a more adequate implementation of basic values such as freedom and equality.
- The solution of the Kurdish question should be tried together with a process of democratization not only of all countries that exercise hegemonic power over the different parts of Kurdistan, but also extends across the entire Middle East. A new democratic policy, however, could only exist from democratic parties and their affiliated institutions "committed to the interests of the society instead of fulfilling state orders".
- While this democratic reforms is not yet possible, a peaceful coexistence with the nation-state is admitted as long as there is no intervention in central issues of self-government or attempts at social assimilation, as well as this coexistence does not mean acceptance of its "classic state structure with its despotic attitude of power". At the end of this process of subjection to democratic reforms, the nation-state must become a more modest political institution, functioning as a social authority that observes functions only in the fields of internal security and in the provision of social services, and its state-related sovereign rights are only limited.
- The health system and the right to native language and culture education must be warranted by both state and civil society.
- The freedom and rights of women must be a strategic part of the fight for freedom and democracy in Kurdistan, as well as the environmental protection must be taken seriously during the process of social change.
- The individual freedoms of expression and choice are irrevocable. Freedom of information is not only an individual right, but an important social issue who depends on the existence of an independent media whose communication with the public is marked by democratic balance.
- The economic resources are not the property of the state but of the society, and its just redistribution is also extremely essential "for the liberation process of the society". An economy committed to the population should also be based on the implementation of an alternative economic policy that does not aim solely at profit, but a production based on sharing and in satisfying basic natural needs for all.

=== Implementation ===
On June 1, 2005, the PKK officially adopted the democratic confederalism program at the end of the 3rd General Assembly of the People's Congress of Kurdistan (Kongra Gelê Kurdistan).

Thereafter, the Kurdish liberation movement began to form clandestine assemblies immediately in Turkey, Syria and Iraq, which in 2007 resulted in the creation of the Kurdistan Communities Union (Koma Civakên Kurdistan, KCK), the organization established to put into effect Öcalan's concept. The KCK brings together Kurdish political parties such as Democratic Union Party (Partiya Yekîtiya Demokrat, PYD), Kurdistan Free Life Party (Partiya Jiyana Azad to Kurdistanê, PJAK), and Kurdistan Democratic Solution Party (Partî Çareserî Dîmukratî Kurdistan, PÇDK); civil society organizations; and armed groups in all countries in the region over the different parts of Kurdistan.

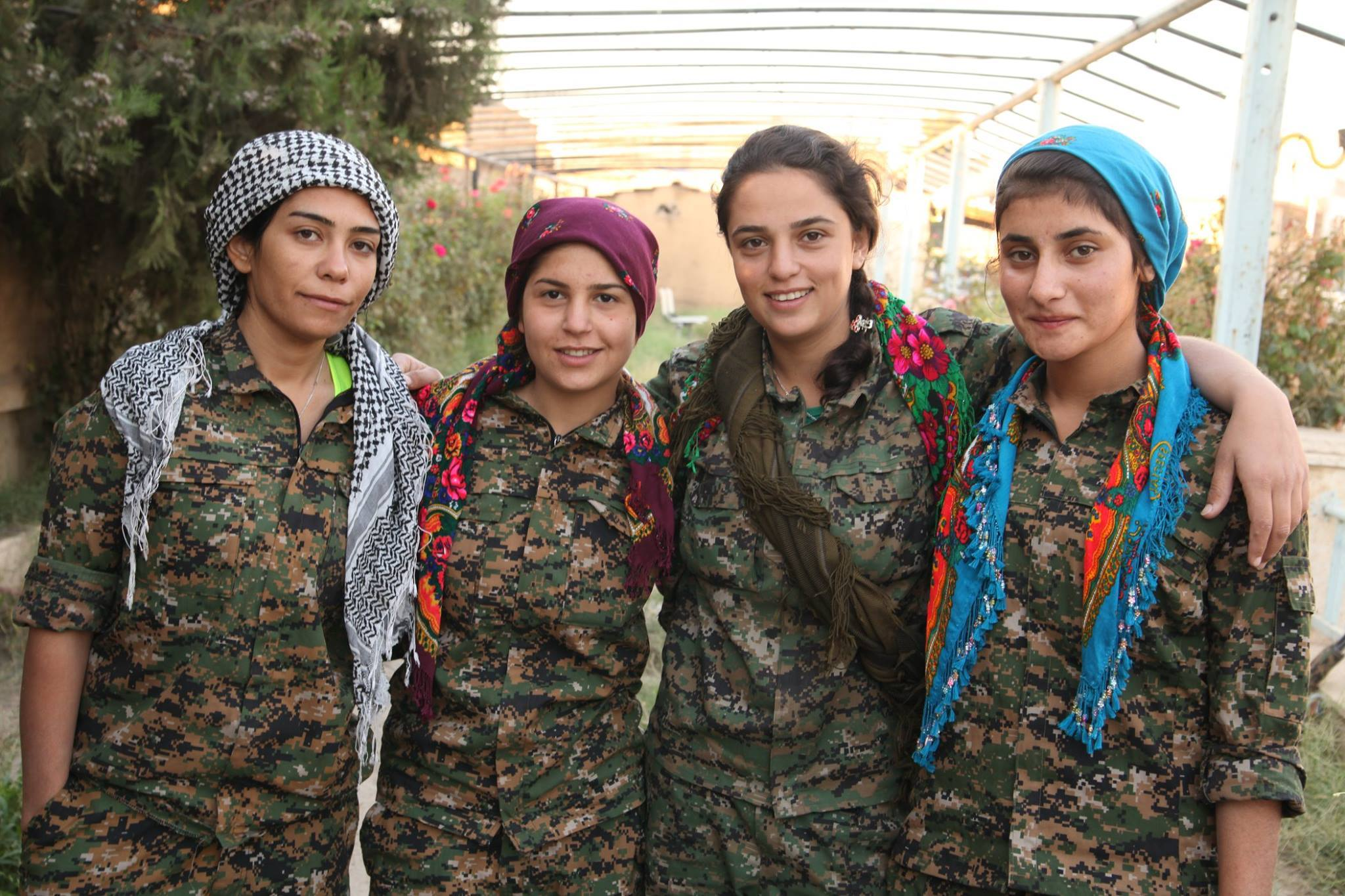
YPJ members in a greenhouse farm, for ecological cooperative farming

Inspired by the project of democratic confederalism, mayors of the Party of the Democratic Society Party (Demokratik Toplum Partisi, DTP) started a fight for collective rights of a political nature in Turkey through civil disobedience campaigns. Challenging the laws that prohibit the official use of the Kurdish language, these politicians begin to use the municipal services and dispatch official correspondence in Kurdish, to reinsert Kurdish names in public places and to spend resources for the development and spread of the Kurdish language. However, these policies made the DTP mayors and deputies targets of judicial harassment, and the Kurdish party was banned by the Turkish Constitutional Court in 2009.

It was during the Civil War in Syria that an opportunity arose to implement Ocalan's new political doctrine deeply, after the PYD declared the autonomy of three cantons in Rojava, a region comprising parts of the north and northeast of Syrian territory. Creating a political entity opposed to the capitalist nation-state, Rojava experienced an original combination of democratic, decentralized and non-hierarchical society based on women's liberation, ecology, cultural pluralism, a co-operative sharing economy, and participatory politics and consensual construction.

== Criticism ==
Democratic confederalism has been criticized by some scholars for prioritizing the democratization of existing states over Kurdish national self-determination. By rejecting the goal of an independent Kurdish state and focusing on reform within existing borders, critics argue that the model limits Kurdish political autonomy and offers little real change.

In the context of Turkey, Democratic confederalism has been described as Turkeyification (Türkiyeleşme). Kamal Soleimani and Behrooz Shojai argue that Öcalan's Turkeyification accepts the legitimacy of the Turkish state and its constitutional order while rejecting federalism and Kurdish official-language status. According to these critics, as reflected in the politics of the DEM Party, the model promotes integration within Turkey rather than structural autonomy for Kurds, leading to voluntary Turkification. Soleimani and Shojai argue that Öcalan fully endorsed and reinterpreted the Misak-ı Milli within the framework of Democratic Confederalism. They suggest that he saw the separation of Southern Kurdistan and Western Kurdistan from Turkey, following the Treaty of Lausanne, as harmful to the Kurdish people, which motivated his development of Democratic Confederalism. According to these critics, his approach seeks to encourage Kurdish collaboration with Turkey, and even territorial annexation, and positions the Kurdistan Communities Union (KCK) as a central actor in applying the Misak-ı Milli to the Middle Eastern context.

== See also ==
- Social ecology
- Libertarian socialism
- Anarchist communism
- Neozapatismo
- Autonomism
