= Sandfontein Artillery Regiment =

Lys' Volunteer Corps Transvaal Horse Artillery Volunteers Transvaal Horse Artillery Sandfontein Artillery Regiment
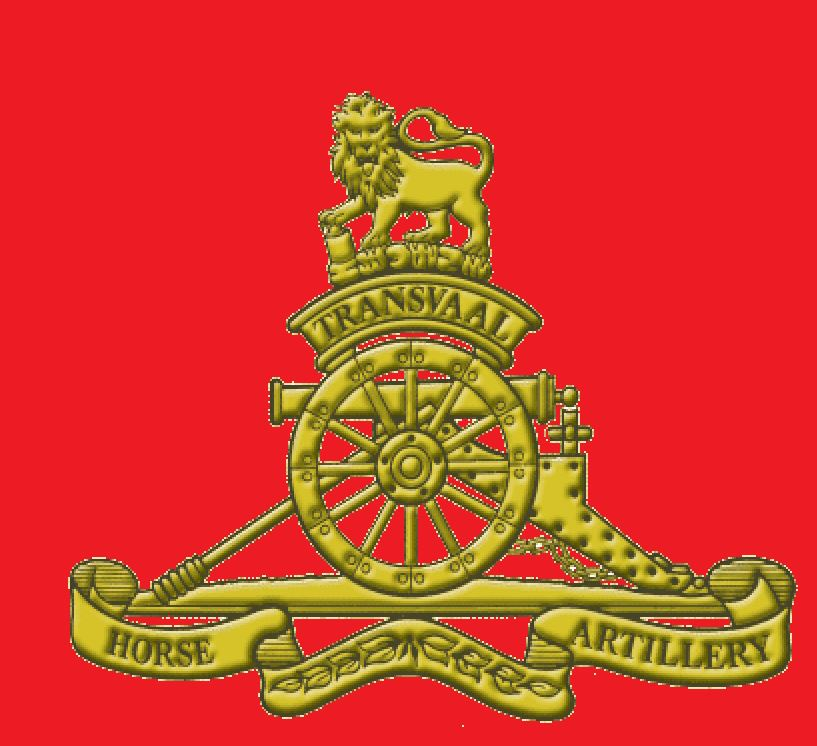
- SANDF Transvaal Horse Artillery emblem
- Active: 17 March 1904 to present
- Country: South Africa
- Allegiance: Republic of South Africa; Republic of South Africa
- Branch: South African Army; South African Army
- Type: Reserve Artillery
- Part of: South African Army Artillery Formation; Army Conventional Reserve
- Garrison/HQ: Mount Collins, Kelvin, Sandton
- Anniversaries: 17 March 1904
- Equipment: 140mm guns
- Engagements: World War I; World War II; South African Border War
- Battle honours: South West Africa 1914-1915
- Website: Official website

Commanders
- Officer Commanding: Major Richard Ngwenya

Insignia
- Collar Badge: Bursting grenade with seven flames
- Beret Colour: Oxford Blue
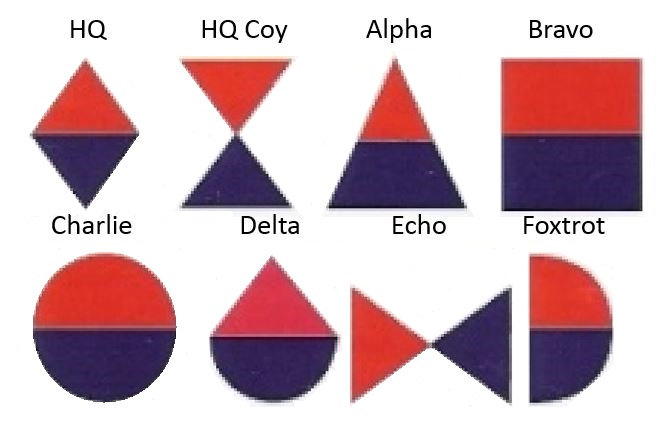
- Artillery Battery Emblems

- Artillery Beret Bar circa 1992
- Abbreviation: SAR

The Sandfontein Artillery Regiment (formerly the Transvaal Horse Artillery) is a reserve artillery regiment of the South African Army.

The Sandfontein Artillery Regiment is currently located in Johannesburg. The main ordnance of the regiment is the G6 self-propelled 155 mm gun/howitzer. It consists of four batteries: Regimental Headquarters Battery, 7 Battery, 8 Battery and 9 Battery.

== History ==
=== Origins ===
The Transvaal Horse Artillery was formed on 17 March 1904 as Lys' Volunteer Corps (after its first commanding officer, Major Godfrey Lys) and was a regiment dependent on horse transport from the start. His adjutant was Brevet-Major J.W.F Lamont, Royal Field Artillery. Lys would resign in January 1905 and Major A. Langebrink took over command. The uniform was in the style of the Royal Household Artillery with the silver substituted by gold. Its first honorary colonel was Thomas Cullinan. The regiment's name was changed six months later to the Transvaal Horse Artillery Volunteers, which it retained until 1911, when the volunteers designation was dropped, to become the Transvaal Horse Artillery.

In 1913, the unit was embodied in the citizen force of the new Union Defence Forces as the 7th Citizen Battery (THA).

=== World War I ===
==== German South-West Africa Campaign ====
The regiment was part of the Northern Force sent to invade (the then) German South-West Africa at the outbreak World War I. It first saw action in September 1914 at Sandfontein and later distinguished itself at Riet and Namutoni.

==== Europe ====
Volunteers from the Transvaal Horse Artillery also later fought as part of the South African Heavy Artillery in Palestine, Egypt and Europe.

=== Inter-war ===
In the inter-war period the regiment grew from a single battery to a three battery brigade; it was also mechanised by the introduction of trucks. During the 1922 Rand Rebellion the THA took part in the Battle of Brixton Bridge and in the clearing of Fordsburg.

The unit was renumbered as the 3rd Citizen Battery (THA) in 1926, and reverted to the name Transvaal Horse Artillery in 1932. On the outbreak of World War II in 1939, it became the 3rd Field Brigade (THA).

Helmet Flash - Transvaal Horse Artillery (THA) - 1904 - 1939

=== World War II ===
During World War II, the THA first saw action against the Italians in Abyssinia.

The regiment's most memorable action during the war was during the battle of Sidi Rezegh in the Western Desert on 23 November 1941. As a part of 5 South African Infantry Brigade Group, the THA suffered considerable losses during heavy action which saw it firing over open sights at the panzers of the Afrika Korps.

After the collapse of Tobruk in June 1942, the regiment lost its headquarters unit as well as its 8th and 9th batteries, except for one troop of 8th Battery. This troop, together with the Coldstream Guards, were the only units to drive out in formation. The remaining (7th) battery of the regiment was first attached to 7 Field Regiment and took part in the fighting at El Alamein in October 1942. It subsequently joined 4/22nd Field Regiment, South African Artillery and saw action throughout the Italian Campaign.

=== Post-war ===
From 1960 to 1968, the THA was affiliated to the University of the Witwatersrand and was known as the Witwatersrand University Regiment.

=== South African Border War ===
During the post-war period, the regiment was often mobilised with 7 South African Infantry Division's 72 Brigade, to take part in South Africa's Border War. The regiment was called up in 1976 for three months active service in Angola and South West Africa and followed this up with two months in the operational area in 1979. Other operations included:

- 1976: In South-West Africa and Angola
- 1979: In South-West Africa during Exercise Eagle Hill, as infantry
- 1981: In Angola during Operation Protea
- 1985: In South-West Africa, again as infantry

== Name change ==
In August 2019, 52 Reserve Force units had their names changed to reflect the diverse military history of South Africa. The Transvaal Horse Artillery became the Sandfontein Artillery Regiment, and had three years to design and implement new regimental insignia.

== Leadership ==
Leadership
From	Honorary Colonel	To	Ribbon
	No known incumbents		
From	Officers Commanding	To	Ribbon
1980	Cmdt Roy Andersen (Note: Later Major General) (Note: General of the Gunners)	1985	
1985	Cmdt Johan Van Wyk	1986	
1986	Cmdt Brent Chalmers	1988	
1988	Cmdt Ivor Rimmer	1991	
1991	Cmdt Raymond Bothé	1994	
1994	Lt Col Mark Dabner	2001	
2001	Maj Ian McDonald	2005	
2005	Maj Albert D. Pestana	2015	
2015	Maj Johan Agenbag	2017	
2017	Maj Richard Ngwenya	n.d.	
From	Regimental Sergeants Major	To	Ribbon
	No known incumbents		

== Freedom of Entry ==
The Freedom of Entry into the City of Johannesburg was bestowed on the Regiment in 1964.

== Current ==
The regiment celebrated their 110th Anniversary in 2014.

On 11 June 2007 the THA shared a Royal Salute alongside the Honourable Artillery Company, (HAC) at the traditional saluting base, the Tower of London, in honour of the official birthday of Prince Philip, Duke of Edinburgh, consort to Queen Elizabeth II. It was the first time that any non-Commonwealth troops participated in such an event in the United Kingdom.

On 16 December 2013 the THA had the honour of firing a 21 gun national salute for the president at the official parade to commemorate the Day of Reconciliation and also in honour of the late President Nelson Mandela at the occasion of the unveiling of this statue at the Union Buildings.

== Regimental symbols ==
- Cap badge: a field gun in the centre, with the word "Transvaal" above it and the words "horse artillery" below, with a laurel branch on a curved scroll in between.
- Helmet Flash: The Helmet Flash has the red W on a background of Blue. This flash is the opposite way around from all the other artillery units. Orpen explains that the flash was worn on the left side of the helmet and the flash was orientated so that the point of the W pointed to the front.
- The Transvaal Horse Artillery was formally affiliated with the Honourable Artillery Company from 1937 to 1961 and then again from 1994 to the present.
- The regiment received the Freedom of the City of Johannesburg in 1964.

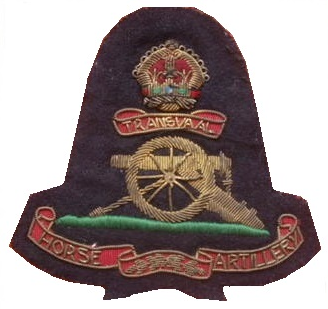
SADF era Transvaal Horse Artillery bullion badge

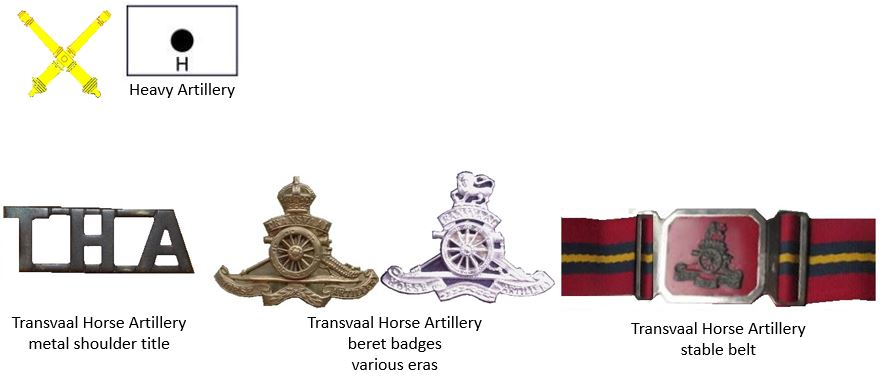
SADF era Transvaal Horse Artillery insignia

== Battle honours ==
Battle Honours
Awarded to Transvaal Horse Artillery
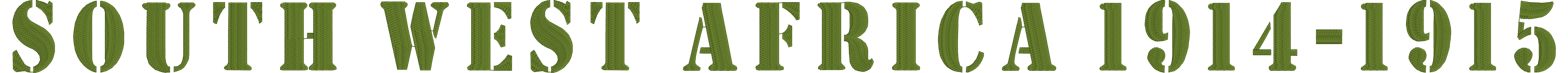

== Alliances ==
- United Kingdom - Honourable Artillery Company
