= Audrey Cobden =

South African activist

Audrey "Bobby" Cobden (April 15, 1923 – March 29, 2016) was a South African activist.

The daughter of Sydney Dodson and Olive Hiles, she was born Audrey Dodson in Johannesburg. Her parents divorced when she was a teenager. She received a degree in psychology from the University of Natal and set up a child psychology practice in Durban. During World War II, she drove a truck as part of a recruiting drive. During the late 1950s, she worked for the Liberal Party of South Africa which had a multiracial membership until the government forced it to disband. She worked in support of the Treason Trial Defence Fund. She assisted black workers during the 1957 Alexandra bus boycott and launched the Domestic Workers and Employers' Project to improve working conditions for black domestic workers. Cobden also helped with the production of the 1959 jazz musical King Kong.

She married Harry Cobden in 1955. When she was 57, she moved with him to Kingston, Ontario. There she served on the board of the Sunnyside Children's Centre, served on the board of the Frontenac-Kingston Council on Aging and worked in palliative care at St. Mary's of the Lake Hospital. After her husband died in 1997, she moved to Peterborough.

Cobden died in Peterborough at the age of 92.
