= Regiment University of the Witwatersrand =

Regiment University of Witwatersrand
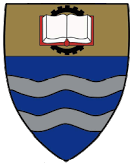
- SADF Regiment University of Witwatersrand emblem
- Active: 1960 to 1985
- Country: South Africa
- Allegiance: Republic of South Africa
- Branch: South African Army
- Type: Reserve Artillery
- Part of: South African Army Artillery Formation; Army Conventional Reserve
- Garrison/HQ: University of the Witwatersrand, Johannesburg
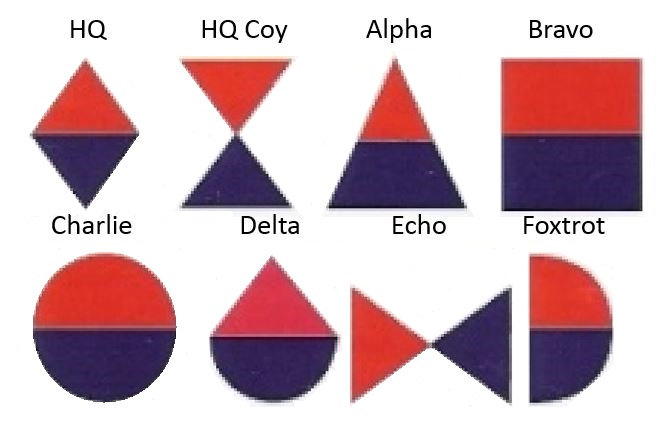
- Artillery Battery Emblems

- Artillery Beret Bar circa 1992

Regiment University of Witwatersrand was an artillery regiment of the South African Army. As a reserve unit, it had a status roughly equivalent to that of a British Army Reserve or United States Army National Guard unit. It was part of the South African Army Artillery Corps.

== History ==
In the late 1950s in South Africa, military units were attached to each large university. The University of Witwatersrand acquired an artillery capability. The concept was for long term students to complete their obligatory military training in these units. Training would also be organised so as not to unduly interfere with university work.

=== Operations ===
The Regiment was affiliated with the university only from 1960 to 1968. The regiment was a part-time unit and was mobilised in limited amounts for the Border War from 1976 to 1979. In 1981 elements of the regiment provided artillery support for Operation Protea. In 1985 the Regiment was deployed in its secondary role as infantry.

=== The development of the Citizen Force ===
Further changes in national service policy resulted in most university students being posted to urban commandos, making it clear the Regiment could no longer remain as constituted.

=== Association with the Transvaal Horse Artillery ===
It was thus decided to revive the name Transvaal Horse Artillery, which today is equipped and trained on the G6 self-propelled 155mm Gun comprising four batteries of a Regimental HQ Battery, No 7 Battery, No 8 Battery and No 9 Battery.

== Regimental Emblems ==
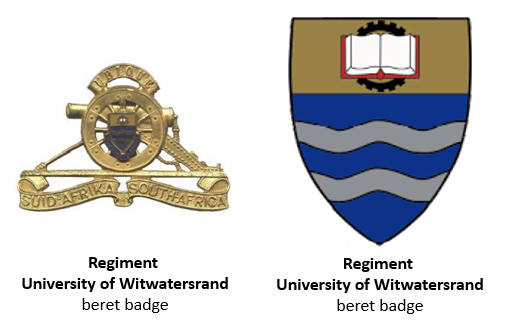
SADF Regiment University of Witwatersrand insignia
