= PUTCO =

South African commuter bus operator

Putco Pty Ltd

- Founded: 1945; 81 years ago
- Headquarters: Sandton, Gauteng, South Africa
- Service area: Gauteng, Limpopo and Western Mpumalanga (KwaNdebele)
- Service type: Public Transit, Private hire and Commercial contracts
- Destinations: Alberton; Boksburg; Bronkhorstspruit; Eldorado Park; Germiston; Johannesburg; Kaalfontein; Meyerton; Midrand; Pretoria; Sebokeng; Soshanguve; Soweto; Vosloorus; Western Mpumalanga (KwaNdebele)
- Hubs: Selby, Putcoton, Vosloorus, Dobsonville, Sandfontein, Soshanguve, Rosslyn, Ekandustria, Vlaklaagte
- Fleet: 1,400+ (2026)
- Daily ridership: 210,000+ (2026)
- Fuel type: Diesel
- Managing Director: Franco Pisapia
- Website: putco.co.za

PUTCO, formerly the Public Utility Transport Corporation, is a South African commuter bus operator based in Sandton, Gauteng. Founded in 1945, PUTCO provides services in Gauteng, Limpopo, and the western parts of Mpumalanga.

In 2026, the company operated a fleet of over 1,400 buses and had a daily ridership of over 210,000.

== History ==
During the apartheid era, Putco was the main "blacks only" bus transport company and was often seen as a symbol of oppression. As a result, the company was frequently targeted in attacks and boycott actions. The biggest challenges at the time were the high cost of diesel fuel, maintenance and spares.

Carleo Enterprises bought back the company from the Leyland Motors Corporation in 1971. They had initially sold their entire shareholding in 1962. Albino Carleo went on to lead Putco as managing director, later serving as chairman and CEO for more than three decades. He retired in September 2004. Franco Pisapia, a nephew of Albino Carleo, took over as managing director.

The company has its own bus body building facility in Brits, outside Pretoria, called the "Dubigeon Body & Coach". It can also overhaul engines and gearboxes.

PUTCO was founded by Jack Bird Barregar in 1945 and listed on the Johannesburg Stock Exchange with an issued share capital of R810,000. At the end of the decade Putco was placed under Judicial Management.

Three years later the capital was restructured and the company was taken out of Judicial Management. Putco pioneers began giving aptitude tests to potential drivers. A year later it also introduced advertising on the sides of its buses. On 7 January 1957 workers from Johannesburg and Pretoria townships began a boycott of Putco, due to the company increasing fares by 25% (one penny at that time) in order to get them out of a continuous financial crisis.

This spontaneous act marked the start of a three-month period during which an estimated 70,000 workers joined in the action, which became known as the 1957 Alexandra bus boycott. Putco was forced to rescind the increase in the bus fare.

At the end of the decade Putco also expanded its service to Durban. Prior to this only municipal bus services were available.

Just after the takeover by Leyland Motors, Putco began the acquisition of other bus services. These included the Edenvale Bus Service from Carleo Enterprises. Six years later Carleo Enterprises sold all their remaining services to Putco. These included Rand Bus Lines and Evaton Passenger Services.

In 1971 Carleo Enterprises bought a 51.6% shareholding of "Putco" from Leyland Motors. Carleo Enterprises then formally changed the name from Public Utility Transport Corporation to Putco Limited. In June 1972, a strike by about 300 Putco drivers won a 33.3% wage increase. It also formed the Transport and Allied Workers Union.

A year later Albino Carleo took over as managing director of Putco. At the end of the decade Putco acquired another company, African Bus Service from United Transport in an acrimonious corporate battle.

On 5 September 1984 a Putco bus was torched with the aid of a petrol bomb after PUTCO employees did not participate in a national anti-apartheid strike. Two of the attackers were granted amnesty by the Truth and Reconciliation Commission in 2001 for their actions on that day, the third person involved was already deceased.

Albino and the board of directors started the "Putco Foundation" in 1982 to assist in social uplifting of the communities which the company serves. Putco fleet peaked at 3,440 vehicles in mid-decade. The buses travel 156 million kilometres a year and carry 353 million passengers.

Mrs. Marina Maponya became the first black person to be appointed as a director of the company in 1986.

A part of the PUTCO fleet.

The effect of the taxi industry had a disastrous impact on Putco; the bus fleet was reduced to 2,500, carrying 120 million passengers a year. Just three years later passenger numbers had dropped to 82 million and the bus fleet was reduced to 2,280. Surprisingly their profits increased to R17,6 million. Despite Putco losing customers, it also withdrew from Durban after suffering considerable losses in that region.

Putco started its first joint venture operation with a black partner in 1998, Valuader (Pty) Limited, in the Vaal Triangle. This was the first of a number of such joint ventures and the "Lekoa Transport Trust" was established.

A year later, the "Ipelegeng Transport Trust" was also established. In October 1990 seven people died and 27 were injured when a Putco bus was attacked at KwaMashu, north of Durban. This was carried out by members of right wing movements in South Africa.

In 2002 Nathi Khena became the first black managing director of the company and the "Asibemunye Transport Trust was established. In 2004 Albino Carleo and a number of the board retired after serving many years. A new board was structured with Franco Pisapia, a nephew of Albino Carleo, becoming the managing director.

Just a year later Putco de-listed from the JSE Limited after sixty years to enable it to take on empowerment partners. Putco achieved an important milestone in the history of the transport industry by completing a BBBEE scheme, empowering its more than 3,300 employees in 2006.

Putco assisted the department of Public Transport Roads and Works with the establishment of a contracting model with Gauteng Women in Transport (GWIT). As of 2005, Putco had subcontracted five buses to GWIT, giving it a total of 10 vehicles. This arrangement ensures that women can lease buses and routes from the company.

== Bus services ==
=== Operating areas ===
Putco currently operates commuter services in the following areas:

- Soweto to the northern suburbs of Johannesburg, including Midrand.
- Alberton to the Johannesburg Central Business District (CBD) and northern suburbs.
- Johannesburg CBD to the northern suburbs.
- Soshanguve to all suburbs in Pretoria.
- Bronkhorstspruit to Pretoria.
- Bronkhorstspruit to Kaalfontein in Ekhuruleni.
- Mamelodi to the northern, eastern and southern suburbs of Pretoria.
- Western Mpumalanga to Pretoria CBD and the suburbs.
- Sebokeng to Meyerton.
- Eldorado Park to Johannesburg and the northern suburbs.
- Voslorus to Boksburg, Germiston and Johannesburg.

=== Tickets ===
A sample of PUTCO tickets

Types of tickets used by Putco include:

- Daily
- Weekly
- Monthly

The fare structure is presented to assist loyal passengers in both cost saving and convenience. This way the fare per trip via a monthly ticket is much cheaper than that of a daily ticket. Fixed and mobile ticket selling points operate in various areas.

Putco is in the process of upgrading its ticketing equipment to the 'Automatic Smart Card Fare Collection and Tracking System' to reduce long lines and floating cash. The contact-less 'Smart Card' also allows passengers to quickly enter the bus by simply placing the card on the reader, thus reducing driver-passenger contact.

This system provides an on-bus smart card and cash-based revenue management system which will help to record data such as passenger behaviour, popular routes and type of tickets purchased. The system will also assist with the dispatching of drivers and post-shift cash-ups. Passengers can now buy smart cards at Soweto operations and mobile vendors at R30 each.

The Smart Card can be re-charged with a weekly, monthly or season ticket. Another benefit of the smart card is that a passenger can use it (once it is re-charged), multiple times. The card fits into a pocket or purse, is very secure and cannot be read or copied.

Installation of the system costs around R30,000 per bus. The system, said to be worth more than R8 million, includes a means of enabling Putco to maintain constant surveillance of its buses in order to monitor driving patterns and driver behaviour.

The entire solution gives us more control over revenue management and more efficient fare collection. The GPS technology will provide [a] valuable insight into driving patterns and driver behaviour. Our ultimate goal is to implement the system in our entire fleet of 1,750 buses, which we hope will happen in the not too distant future.

— managing director Franco Pisapia, Project launch

=== Access Buses ===
The special ramp on the PUTCO Access Buses.

In 2002 Putco initiated the building of special access buses for disabled passengers. These vehicles were designed after consultation with organisations for the disabled in Putco bus body building operation in Brits. They utilise a special loading platform.

During a trip the wheelchairs are secured by load binders to the floor structure. Seat belts and an additional wheelchair storage area are provided. There are also coded hand-rails and bell-pushes for the partially sighted.

At present six access buses are being operated, three in the Pretoria area and the others in the Johannesburg area. These buses also have specially trained crews, two per bus, to assist passengers.

== Accidents ==
=== 2000 ===
In 2000 the Gauteng Transport Department ordered Putco to check all its vehicles for roadworthiness. This followed a crash which left thirteen people dead near Pretoria. The accident, which also left twenty-seven people injured, occurred when a Putco bus collided with a minibus taxi on the Moloto road near Kameeldrift. Investigations revealed that the bus driver lost control of the vehicle after its steering mechanism failed. The bus veered into oncoming traffic, hitting the taxi.

At the end of the year the notorious Moloto road claimed another sixteen lives when a Putco bus driver overtook a minibus taxi and collided with another Putco bus in rainy conditions. The bloodbath once again prompted a ritual outpouring of anger and grief. It also triggered oft-repeated calls on the government to make good its promises to upgrade the road.

=== 2006 ===
In April 2006 a hundred and thirteen people were injured in a four-bus pile-up north of Pretoria. The accident happened at the Putco depot where three buses had stopped when a fourth hit a bus from behind, causing each one to ram the vehicle in front of it. The provincial minister said to the press that both accidents could have been avoided if the drivers followed the rules of the road and the buses were in a roadworthy condition. The Mpumalanga Roads and Transport Department met staff from Putco to discuss the condition of some of the company's buses.

We are going to meet with the bus owners to discuss ways to improve the way Putco carries our people.

— Provincial minister Fish Mahlalela, South African Press Association

== See also ==
- 1957 Alexandra bus boycott
- Broad Based Black Economic Empowerment
- Taxi wars in South Africa
