= Murray Bookchin =

American social theorist (1921–2006)

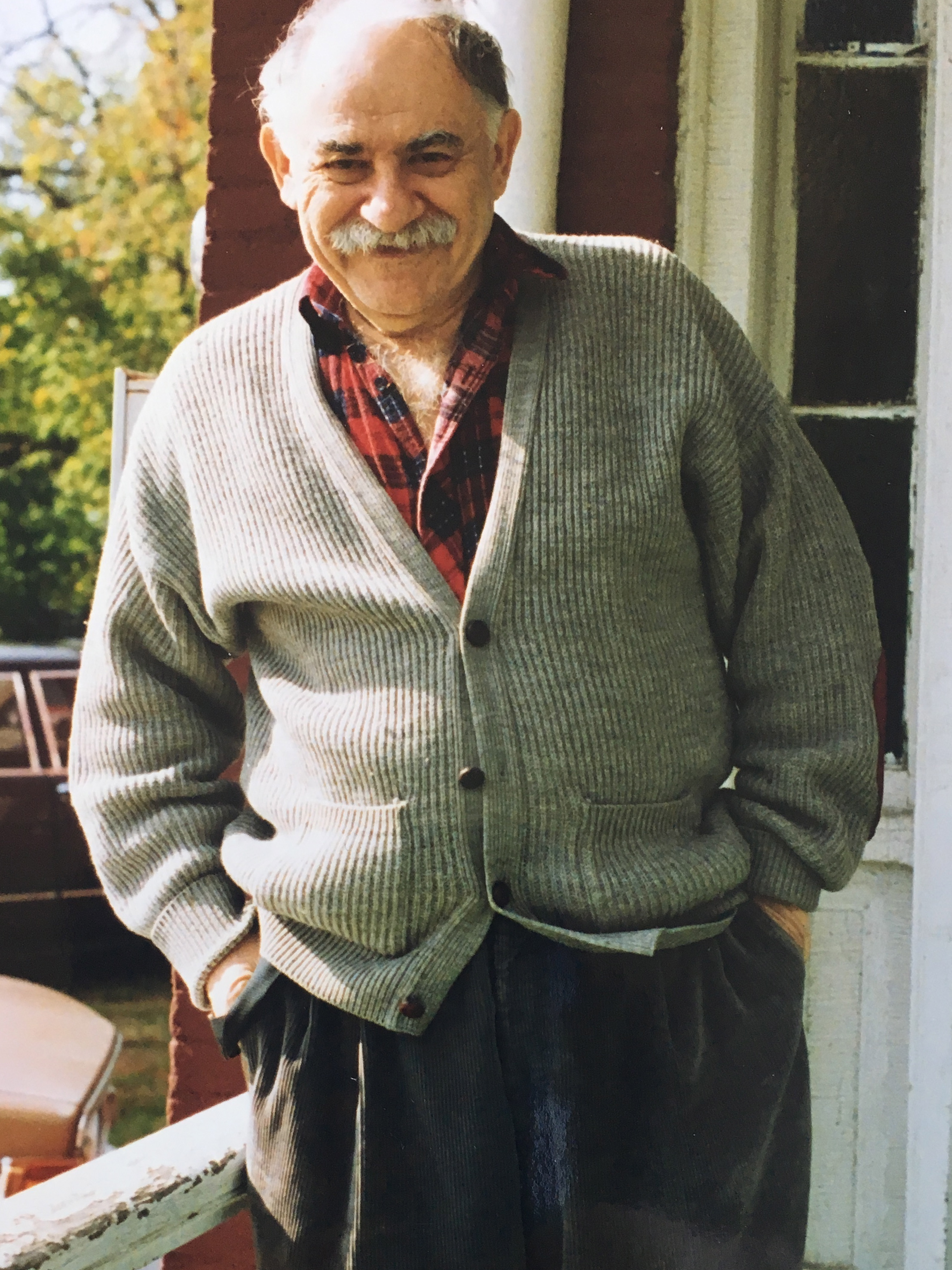
- Bookchin in 1990
- Born: Mortimore Bookchin; January 14, 1921; New York City, US
- Died: July 30, 2006 (aged 85); Burlington, Vermont, US

Philosophical work
- Era: 20th-, 21st-century philosophy
- Region: Western philosophy
- School: Continental philosophy, anarchism, libertarian socialism, Hegelianism
- Main interests: Philosophy of ecology, social hierarchy, dialectics, post-scarcity, anarchism, libertarian socialism, ethics, environmental sustainability, ecology, history of popular revolutionary movements
- Notable ideas: Communalism, libertarian municipalism, social ecology, dialectical naturalism

Murray Bookchin (/ˈbʊktʃɪn/; January 14, 1921 – July 30, 2006) was an American social theorist, author, orator, historian, and political philosopher. Influenced by the works of G. W. F. Hegel, Karl Marx, and Peter Kropotkin, he was a pioneer in the environmental movement. Bookchin formulated and developed the theory of social ecology and urban planning within anarchist, libertarian socialist, and ecological thought. He was the author of two dozen books covering topics in politics, philosophy, history, urban affairs, and social ecology. Among the most important were Our Synthetic Environment (1962), Post-Scarcity Anarchism (1971), The Ecology of Freedom (1982), and Urbanization Without Cities (1987). In the late 1990s, he became disenchanted with what he saw as an increasingly apolitical "lifestylism" of the contemporary anarchist movement, stopped referring to himself as an anarchist, and founded his own libertarian socialist ideology called "communalism", which seeks to reconcile and expand Marxist, syndicalist, and anarchist thought.

Bookchin was a prominent anti-capitalist, anti-fascist and advocate of social decentralization along ecological and democratic lines. His ideas have influenced social movements since the 1960s, including the New Left, the anti-nuclear movement, the anti-globalization movement, Occupy Wall Street, and the democratic confederalism of the Democratic Autonomous Administration of North and East Syria (Rojava). He was a central figure in the American green movement. An autodidact who never attended college, he is considered to be one of the most important left theorists of the twentieth century.

== Biography ==
=== Background and early life (1921–1930) ===
Bookchin was born on 1921 in New York City to Nathan Bookchin (born Nacham Wisotsky) and his first wife, Rose (Kalusky) Bookchin, Jewish immigrants from the Russian Empire. His father was from Mazyr (now Belarus) and his mother from Vilnius (Lithuania). He was embarrassed by his given name Mortimore and went by his childhood nickname, Murray. His father adopted the name of a relative, Bukczin, and anglicized it to Bookchin. His parents divorced in 1934. He grew up in East Tremont, Bronx with his mother, uncle Daniel, and maternal grandmother, Zeitel, a Socialist Revolutionary who imbued him with Russian populist ideas.

=== Early political involvement and personal life (1930–1947) ===
After his grandmother's death in 1930, he joined the Young Pioneers of America, the Communist youth organization (for children 9 to 14) and the Young Communist League (for youths) in 1935. He attended the Workers School near Union Square, where he studied Marxism. In the late 1930s, he broke with Stalinism and gravitated toward Trotskyism, joining the Socialist Workers Party (SWP). In the early 1940s, he worked in a foundry in Bayonne, New Jersey, where he was a trade union organizer and shop steward for the United Electrical Workers as well as a recruiter for the SWP. Within the SWP, he adhered to the Goldman-Morrow faction, which broke away after the war ended. He was an auto worker and UAW member at the time of the great General Motors strike of 1945–46. In 1949, while speaking to a Zionist youth organization at City College, Bookchin met a mathematics student, Beatrice Appelstein, whom he married in 1951. They were married for 12 years and lived together for 35, remaining close friends and political allies for the rest of his life. They had two children, Debbie and Joseph. On religious views, Bookchin was an atheist, but was considered to be tolerant of religious views.

=== Writing for contemporary issues and interest in ecology ===
From 1947, Bookchin collaborated with a fellow lapsed Trotskyist, the German expatriate Josef Weber, in New York in the Movement for a Democracy of Content, a group of 20 or so post-Trotskyists who collectively edited the periodical Contemporary Issues – A Magazine for a Democracy of Content. Contemporary Issues embraced utopianism. The periodical provided a forum for the belief that previous attempts to create utopia had foundered on the necessity of toil and drudgery; but now modern technology had obviated the need for human toil, a liberatory development. To achieve this "post-scarcity" society, Bookchin developed a theory of ecological decentralism. The magazine published Bookchin's first articles, including the pathbreaking "The Problem of Chemicals in Food" (1952). In 1958, Bookchin defined himself as an anarchist, seeing parallels between anarchism and environmentalism. His first book, Our Synthetic Environment, was published under the pseudonym Lewis Herber, in 1962, a few months before Rachel Carson's famous Silent Spring.

=== Middle career (1960s–80) ===
In 1964, Bookchin joined the Congress of Racial Equality (CORE), and protested racism at the 1964 World's Fair. During 1964–1967, while living on Manhattan's Lower East Side, he cofounded and was the principal figure in the New York Federation of Anarchists. His groundbreaking essay "Ecology and Revolutionary Thought" introduced environmentalism and, more specifically, ecology as a concept in radical politics. In 1968, he founded another group that published the influential Anarchos magazine, which published that and other innovative essays on post-scarcity and sustainable technologies such as solar and wind energy, and on decentralization and miniaturization. Lecturing throughout the United States, he helped popularize the concept of ecology to the counterculture. His widely republished 1969 essay "Listen, Marxist!" warned Students for a Democratic Society (in vain) against an impending takeover by a Marxist group. "Once again the dead are walking in our midst," he wrote, "ironically, draped in the name of Marx, the man who tried to bury the dead of the nineteenth century. So the revolution of our own day can do nothing better than parody, in turn, the October Revolution of 1917 and the civil war of 1918–1920, with its 'class line,' its Bolshevik Party, its 'proletarian dictatorship,' its puritanical morality, and even its slogan, 'Soviet power'".

In 1969–1970, he taught at the Alternate U, a counter-cultural radical school based on 14th Street in Manhattan. In 1971, he moved to Burlington, Vermont, with a group of friends, to put into practice his ideas of decentralization. In the fall of 1973, he was hired by Goddard College to lecture on technology; his lectures led to a teaching position and to the creation of the Social Ecology Studies program in 1974 and the Institute for Social Ecology (ISE) soon thereafter, of which he became the director. In 1974, he was hired by Ramapo College in Mahwah, New Jersey, where he quickly became a full professor. The ISE was a hub for experimentation and study of appropriate technology in the 1970s. In 1977–78, he was a member of the Spruce Mountain Affinity Group of the Clamshell Alliance. Also, in 1977, he published The Spanish Anarchists, a history of the Spanish anarchist movement up to the revolution of 1936. During this period, Bookchin briefly forged some ties with the nascent libertarian movement, speaking at a Libertarian Party convention and contributing to a newsletter edited by Karl Hess. Nevertheless, Bookchin rejected the types of libertarianism that advocated unconstrained individualism.

=== Late life and death ===
In 1980, Bookchin co-established the New England Anarchist Conference (NEAC) to organize the anarchist movement in the United States. At its first meeting in October 1980, 175 anarchists from the northeastern US and Quebec attended. By the second conference in January 1981 in Somerville, Massachusetts, the NEAC devolved into sectarianism, which moved Bookchin to lose faith in a socialist revolution happening in the US.

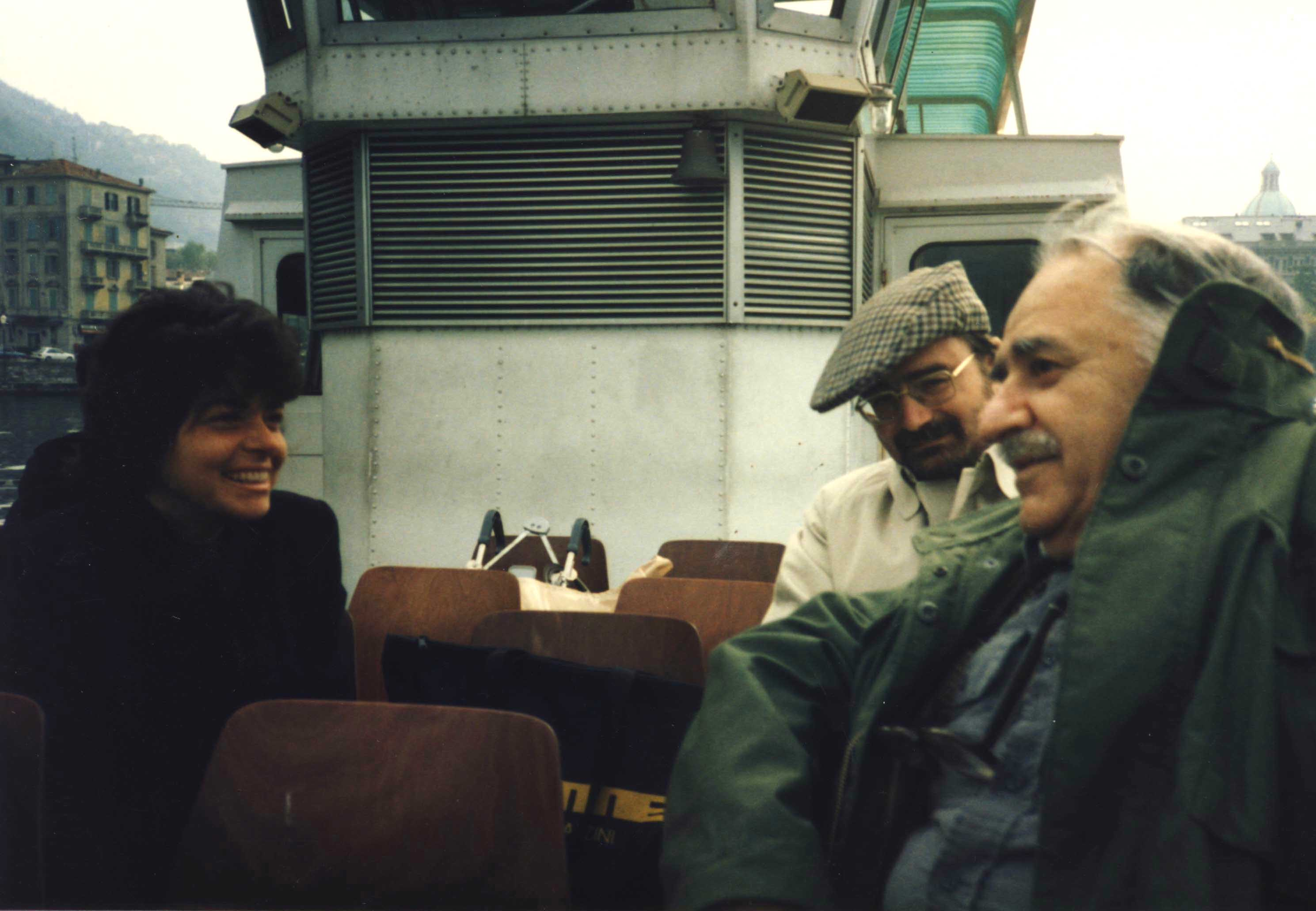
Bookchin on a boat sailing the Lake Como with Rossella di Leo and Amedeo Bertolo, photographed by Janet Biehl in 1988

During the 1980s, Bookchin engaged in occasional critiques of Bernie Sanders' mayorship in Burlington. Bookchin criticized Sanders' politics, claiming he lacked a drive to establish direct democracy, followed a Marxian deprioritization of ecology, and was a “'centralist' who narrowly focused on economic growth." Bookchin and his social ecologist colleagues in the Burlington Greens, which he co-founded with his former wife Bea Bookchin, criticized the Sanders administration for pushing for a luxury condo waterfront redevelopment, which was eventually rejected by Burlington voters. They advocated for a moratorium on growth, a moral economy, and social justice rooted in grassroots democracy.

In 1987 Bookchin began a collaboration with Janet Biehl that would last until his death in 2006. Biehl was his companion, editor, and advocate, as well as (after his death) his biographer and archivist.

In 1988, Bookchin and Howie Hawkins founded the Left Green Network "as a radical alternative to U.S. Green liberals", based around the principles of social ecology and libertarian municipalism.

In 1995, Bookchin lamented the decline of American anarchism into primitivism, anti-technologism, neo-Situationism, individual self-expression, and "ad hoc adventurism," at the expense of forming a social movement. He formally broke with anarchism in 1999, describing himself in 2002 as a "communalist" in a major essay elaborating his late-life views, called "The Communalist Project".

He continued to teach at the ISE until 2004. Bookchin died of congestive heart failure on July 30, 2006, at his home in Burlington, at the age of 85.

== Thought ==
In addition to his political writings, Bookchin wrote extensively on philosophy, calling his ideas dialectical naturalism. The dialectical writings of Georg Wilhelm Friedrich Hegel, which articulate a developmental philosophy of change and growth, seemed to him to lend themselves to an organic, environmentalist approach. Although Hegel "exercised a considerable influence" on Bookchin, he was not, in any sense, a Hegelian. His philosophical writings emphasize humanism, rationality, and the ideals of the Enlightenment.

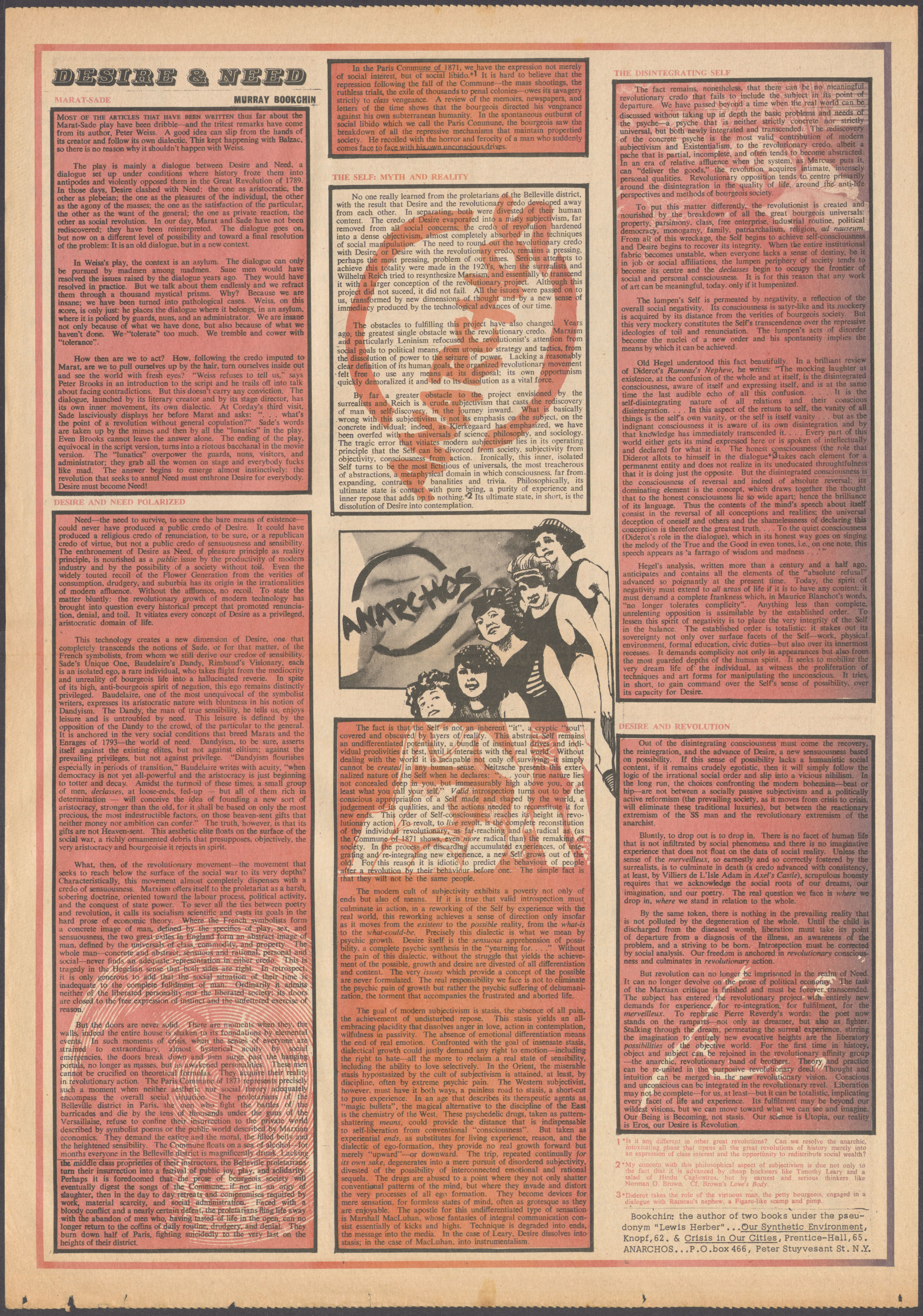
Bookchin writing about the play Marat/Sade and its relation to Desire and Hegel's understanding of it in revolutionary politics in Helix Magazine, 1968

=== General sociological and psychological views ===
Bookchin was critical of class-centered analysis of Marxism and simplistic anti-state forms of libertarianism and liberalism and wished to present what he saw as a more complex view of societies. In The Ecology of Freedom: The Emergence and Dissolution of Hierarchy, he says that:

My use of the word hierarchy in the subtitle of this work is meant to be provocative. There is a strong theoretical need to contrast hierarchy with the more widespread use of the words class and State; careless use of these terms can produce a dangerous simplification of social reality. To use the words hierarchy, class, and State interchangeably, as many social theorists do, is insidious and obscurantist. This practice, in the name of a "classless" or "libertarian" society, could easily conceal the existence of hierarchical relationships and a hierarchical sensibility, both of which—even in the absence of economic exploitation or political coercion—would serve to perpetuate unfreedom.

Bookchin also points to an accumulation of hierarchical systems throughout history that has occurred up to contemporary societies which tends to determine the human collective and individual psyche:

The objective history of the social structure becomes internalized as a subjective history of the psychic structure. Heinous as my view may be to modern Freudians, it is not the discipline of work but the discipline of rule that demands the repression of internal nature. This repression then extends outward to external nature as a mere object of rule and later of exploitation. This mentality permeates our individual psyches in a cumulative form up to the present day—not merely as capitalism but as the vast history of hierarchical society from its inception.

Bookchin argued that both Marxism and syndicalism had focused too narrowly on appealing to workers and workplace issues.

Yes, class struggles still exist, but they occur farther and farther below the threshold of class war. Workers, as I can attest from my own experience as a foundryman and as an autoworker for General Motors, do not regard themselves as mindless adjuncts to machines or as factory dwellers or even as "instruments of history," as Marxists might put it. They regard themselves as living human beings: as fathers and mothers, as sons and daughters, as people with dreams and visions, as members of communities—not only of trade unions.

=== Humanity's environmental predicament ===
Bookchin's book about humanity's collision course with the natural world, Our Synthetic Environment, was published six months before Rachel Carson's Silent Spring.

Bookchin rejected Barry Commoner's belief that the environmental crisis could be traced to technological choices, Paul Ehrlich's view that it could be traced to overpopulation, and the even more pessimistic view that traces this crisis to human nature. Rather, Bookchin felt that our environmental predicament is the result of the cancerous logic of capitalism, a system aimed at maximizing profit instead of enriching human lives: "By the very logic of its grow-or-die imperative, capitalism may well be producing ecological crises that gravely imperil the integrity of life on this planet."

The solution to this crisis, he said, is not a return to hunter-gatherer societies, which Bookchin characterized as xenophobic and warlike. Bookchin likewise opposed "a politics of mere protest, lacking programmatic content, a proposed alternative, and a movement to give people direction and continuity." He posited on what was needed:

...a constant awareness that a given society's irrationality is deep-seated, that its serious pathologies are not isolated problems that can be cured piecemeal but must be solved by sweeping changes in the often hidden sources of crisis and suffering—that awareness alone is what can hold a movement together, give it continuity, preserve its message and organization beyond a given generation, and expand its ability to deal with new issues and developments.

The answer then lies in communalism, a system encompassing a directly democratic political organization anchored in loosely confederated popular assemblies, decentralization of power, absence of domination of any kind, and replacing capitalism with human-centered forms of production.

=== Social ecology ===
Social ecology is a philosophical theory associated with Bookchin, concerned with the relationship between ecological and social issues. It is not a movement but a theory primarily associated with his thought and elaborated over his body of work. He presents a utopian philosophy of human evolution that combines the nature of biology and society into a third "thinking nature" beyond biochemistry and physiology, which he argues is a more complete, conscious, ethical, and rational nature. Humanity, by this line of thought, is the latest development from the long history of organic development on Earth. Bookchin's social ecology proposes ethical principles for replacing a society's propensity for hierarchy and domination with that of democracy and freedom.

It emerged from a time in the mid-1960s, under the emergence of both the global environmental and the American civil rights movements, and played a much more visible role from the upward movement against nuclear power by the late 1970s. It presents ecological problems as arising mainly from social problems, in particular from different forms of hierarchy and domination beginning with gerontocracy and patriarchy and extending through various forms of oppression including gender, race, and class status. It seeks to resolve them through the model of a non-hierarchical ecological society based on self-determination at the local level, which opposes the current capitalist system of production and consumption. It aims to set up a moral, decentralized, united society, guided by reason. While Bookchin distanced himself from anarchism later in his life, the philosophical theory of social ecology is often considered to be a form of eco-anarchism.

Bookchin wrote about the effects of urbanization on human life in the early 1960s during his participation in the civil rights and related social movements. He then began to pursue the connection between ecological and social issues, culminating with his best-known book, The Ecology of Freedom, which he had developed over a decade. His argument, that human domination and destruction of nature follows from social domination between humans, was a breakthrough position in the growing field of ecology. He writes that life develops from self-organization and evolutionary cooperation (symbiosis). Bookchin wrote of preliterate societies organized around mutual need but ultimately overrun by institutions of hierarchy and domination, such as city-states and capitalist economies, which he attributes uniquely to societies of humans and not communities of animals. He proposes confederation between communities of humans run through democracy rather than through administrative logistics.

Bookchin's work, beginning with anarchist writings on the subject in the 1960s, has continuously evolved. Towards the end of the 1990s, he increasingly integrated the principle of communalism, with aspirations more inclined towards institutionalized municipal democracy, which distanced him from certain evolutions of anarchism. Bookchin's work draws inspiration from, and expands up, anarchism (mainly Kropotkin), Syndicalism, and Marxism (including the writings of Marx and Engels). Social ecology refuses the pitfalls of a Neo-Malthusian ecology which erases social relationships by replacing them with "natural forces", but also of a technocratic ecology which considers that environmental progress must rely on technological breakthroughs and that the state will play an integral role in this technological development. According to Bookchin, these two currents depoliticize ecology and mythologize the past and the future.

In May 2016, the first "International Social Ecology Meetings" were organized in Lyon, France, which brought together a hundred radical environmentalists, decreasing figures and libertarians, most of whom came from France, Belgium, Spain and Switzerland, but also from the United States, Guatemala and Canada. At the center of the debates: libertarian municipalism as an alternative to the nation state and the need to rethink activism.

==== Kurdish movement ====
Bookchin's reflections on social ecology and libertarian municipalism also inspired Abdullah Öcalan, the historical leader of the Kurdish movement, to create the concept of democratic confederalism, which aims to bring together the peoples of the Middle East in a confederation of democratic, multicultural and ecological communes. Adopted by the Kurdistan Workers' Party (PKK) since 2005, Öcalan's project represents a major ideological shift away from their previous goal of establishing a Marxist–Leninist state. In addition to the PKK, Öcalan's internationalist project was also well received by its Syrian counterpart, the Party of Democratic Union (PYD), which would become the first organization in the world to actually found a society based on the principles of democratic confederalism. On January 6, 2014, the cantons of Rojava, in Syrian Kurdistan, federated into autonomous municipalities, adopting a social contract which established a decentralized non-hierarchical society, based on principles of direct democracy, feminism, ecology, cultural pluralism, participatory politics and economic cooperativism.

=== Municipalism and communalism ===
Bookchin's vision of an ecological society is based on highly participatory, grassroots politics, in which municipal communities democratically plan and manage their affairs through popular assembly, a program he called communalism. This democratic deliberation purposefully promotes autonomy and self-reliance, as opposed to centralized state politics. While this program retains elements of anarchism, it emphasizes a higher degree of organization (community planning, voting, and institutions) than general anarchism. In Bookchin's communalism, these autonomous municipal communities connect with each other via confederations.

Starting in the 1970s, Bookchin argued that the arena for libertarian social change should be the municipal level. In 1980, Bookchin used the term "libertarian municipalism" to describe a libertarian socialist system in which institutions of directly democratic assemblies would oppose and replace the state with a confederation of free municipalities. In The Next Revolution, Bookchin stresses the link that libertarian municipalism has with his earlier philosophy of social ecology. He writes:

Libertarian Municipalism constitutes the politics of social ecology, a revolutionary effort in which freedom is given institutional form in public assemblies that become decision-making bodies.

Bookchin proposes that these institutional forms must take place within differently scaled local areas. In a 2001 interview, he summarized his views this way:

The overriding problem is to change the structure of society so that people gain power. The best arena to do that is the municipality—the city, town, and village—where we have an opportunity to create a face-to-face democracy.

Libertarian municipalism intends to create a situation in which the two powers—the municipal confederations and the nation state cannot coexist.

==== Municipalization as a foundation for an ecological society ====
Bookchin posits that neither privatization nor nationalization can effectively pave the way toward an ecological society. He asserts that both models are deeply embedded in structures of domination, failing to address the root causes of environmental crises. In contrast, Bookchin advocates for municipalization as a core principle in his libertarian municipalist framework.

=== Critique of privatization and nationalization ===
Bookchin critiques private property as a central driver of both social and ecological harm, associating it with exploitation, domination, and the prioritization of profit over community and environmental well-being. According to Bookchin, systems based on private ownership promote competition and individualism, which he argues are incompatible with the cooperation and solidarity needed to build a fair and sustainable society.

Nationalization, often positioned as a remedy to capitalism's excesses, is also seen by Bookchin as inadequate. He contends that nationalization typically shifts control from private companies to centralized bureaucratic entities, merely replacing one form of dominance with another. In this state-centered model, the apparatus of the state, rather than the market, assumes authority over economic activities. This can lead to what Bookchin describes as a "privatized economy in a collectivized form", where workers remain detached from their labor and ecological exploitation persists.

== Legacy and influence ==
Although Bookchin acknowledged that his ideas had attracted relatively limited support during his lifetime, they subsequently influenced some political movements and thinkers internationally.

Bookchin's writings influenced the development of radical environmentalism and the New Left during the 1960s and 1970s. By combining ecological concerns with criticism of social hierarchy, Bookchin contributed to the development of social ecology as a distinct school of environmental political thought. Historian Maximilian Fenner identified Bookchin's early writings and activism as influential in both the New Left and the radical ecology movement, particularly through their treatment of environmental problems as political and social questions.

Bookchin's ideas were also promoted through the Institute for Social Ecology, which he co-founded with Dan Chodorkoff in Vermont in 1974. The institute developed educational programs addressing ecological philosophy, social theory, alternative technologies and grassroots political organizing. It provided an institutional setting for the continued study and application of social ecology.

Bookchin's ideas also influenced Kurdish movements, particularly the Kurdish People's Protection Units (YPG) and closely aligned Kurdistan Workers' Party (PKK) in Turkey, which have fought the Turkish state since the 1980s to try to secure greater political and cultural rights for the country's Kurds. The PKK is designated as a terrorist organization by the Turkish and United States governments, while the YPG has been considered an ally of the US against ISIS. Though founded on a rigid Marxist–Leninist ideology, the PKK has seen a shift in its thought and aims since the capture and imprisonment of its leader, Abdullah Öcalan, in 1999. Öcalan began reading a variety of post-Marxist political theory while in prison, and found particular interest in Bookchin's works.

Öcalan attempted in early 2004 to arrange a meeting with Bookchin through his lawyers, describing himself as Bookchin's "student" eager to adapt his thought to Middle Eastern society. Bookchin was too ill to accept the request. In May 2004, Bookchin conveyed this message "My hope is that the Kurdish people will one day be able to establish a free, rational society that will allow their brilliance once again to flourish. They are fortunate indeed to have a leader of Mr. Öcalan's talents to guide them". When Bookchin died in 2006, the PKK hailed the American thinker as "one of the greatest social scientists of the 20th century", and vowed to put his theory into practice.

"Democratic confederalism", the variation on communalism developed by Öcalan in his writings and adopted by the PKK, does not outwardly seek Kurdish rights within the context of the formation of an independent state separate from Turkey. The PKK claims that this project is not envisioned as being only for Kurds, but rather for all peoples of the region, regardless of their ethnic, national, or religious background. Rather, it promulgates the formation of assemblies and organizations beginning at the grassroots level to enact its ideals in a non-state framework beginning at the local level. It also places a particular emphasis on securing and promoting women's rights. The PKK has had some success in implementing its programme, through organizations such as the Democratic Society Congress (DTK), which coordinates political and social activities within Turkey, and the Koma Civakên Kurdistan (KCK), which does so across all countries where Kurds live.

== Selected works ==
- Post-Scarcity Anarchism (1971)
- The Spanish Anarchists: The Heroic Years (1977)
- The Ecology of Freedom: The Emergence and Dissolution of Hierarchy (1982)

== See also ==
- Eco-socialism
- History of the Green Party of the United States
- Insurrectionary communes in France in 1870–1871
- Outline of libertarianism

== Sources ==
- Biehl, Janet (2015). Ecology or Catastrophe: The Life of Murray Bookchin. New York: Oxford University Press. ISBN 978-0-19-934248-8.
- Bookchin, Murray (January 6, 2015). The Next Revolution: Popular Assemblies and the Promise of Direct Democracy. Verso Books. ISBN 978-1781685815.
- Curran, Giorel (2007). 21st Century Dissent: Anarchism, Anti-Globalization and Environmentalism. International Political Economy. Palgrave Macmillan. ISBN 978-1-4039-4881-6.
- Light, Andrew, ed. (1998). Social Ecology After Bookchin. Guilford Press. ISBN 1-57230-379-4. LCCN 98-35447. Archived from the original on September 21, 2023.
- Price, Andy (2012). "Social Ecology". In Kinna, Ruth (ed.). The Continuum Companion to Anarchism. Continuum International Publishing Group. pp. 231–249. ISBN 978-1-4411-4270-2.
