= Post-Scarcity Anarchism =

1971 book by Murray Bookchin

- Cover of the first edition
- Author: Murray Bookchin
- Language: English
- Subject: Anarchism
- Publisher: Ramparts Press
- Publication date: 1971
- Publication place: United States
- Media type: Print (Hardcover and Paperback)
- Pages: 288
- ISBN: 0-87867-005-X
- OCLC: 159676
- Dewey Decimal: 335/.83
- LC Class: HX833 .B63

Post-Scarcity Anarchism is a collection of essays by Murray Bookchin, first published in 1971 by Ramparts Press. In it, Bookchin outlines the possible form anarchism might take under conditions of post-scarcity. One of Bookchin's major works, its author's radical thesis provoked controversy for being utopian in its faith in the liberatory potential of technology.

== Summary ==
Bookchin's "post-scarcity anarchism" is an economic system based on social ecology, libertarian municipalism, and an abundance of fundamental resources. Bookchin argues that post-industrial societies have the potential to be developed into post-scarcity societies, and can thus imagine "the fulfillment of the social and cultural potentialities latent in a technology of abundance". The self-administration of society is now made possible by technological advancement and, when technology is used in an ecologically sensitive manner, the revolutionary potential of society will be much changed.

Bookchin claims that the expanded production made possible by the technological advances of the twentieth century were in the pursuit of market profit and at the expense of the needs of humans and of ecological sustainability. The accumulation of capital can no longer be considered a prerequisite for liberation, and the notion that obstructions such as the state, social hierarchy, and vanguard political parties are necessary in the struggle for freedom of the working classes can be dispelled as a myth.

== Reception ==
Bookchin's thesis has been seen as a form of anarchism more radical than that of Noam Chomsky; while both concur that information technology, being controlled by the bourgeoisie, is not necessarily liberatory, Bookchin does not refrain from countering this control by developing new, innovative and radical technologies of the self. Postanarchist scholar Lewis Call compares Bookchin's language to that of Marcel Mauss, Georges Bataille and Herbert Marcuse, and notes that Bookchin anticipates the importance of cybernetic technology to the development of human potential over a decade before the origin of cyberpunk. The collection has been cited favourably by Marius de Geus as presenting "inspiring sketches" of the future, and as "an insightful analysis" and "a discussion of revolutionary potential in a technological society" by Peggy Kornegger in her essay "Anarchism: The Feminist Connection".

== See also ==
- Counterrevolution and Revolt
- The Dispossessed
- Nanosocialism
- Post-scarcity
- Social ecology
- List of books about anarchism
