= The Movement for a Democracy of Content =

The Movement for a Democracy of Content was a revolutionary political organisation active in the US from the late 1940s to the early 1970s. With groups in the UK, the United States, West Germany and South Africa, the Movement is best known for publishing the influential political magazine Contemporary Issues - A Magazine for a Democracy of Content. Its German sister publication Dinge der Zeit, with much of the same content in German, published its last issue in August 1997 (exactly 50 years after their first issue). It is also known for its involvement in the 1957 Alexandra bus boycott in Johannesburg.

== Origins ==
The genesis of the Movement lay in the June 1947 publication of a magazine called Dinge der Zeit - Zeitschrift für inhaltliche Demokratie (Contemporary Issues). The first few issues of this magazine were shrouded in mystery, as nearly every contributor chose to write under a pseudonym.

The man credited with being the Movement's leading theoretician was Josef Weber, a German former member of a Trotskyist group, the IKD (Internationale Kommunisten Deutschlands). Weber - also known as Ernst Zander, William Lunen and Erik Erikson - remained one of the most frequent contributors to Contemporary Issues until his death in 1959. The most prominent members of the Movement in its early years tended to be German émigrés - a mix of former Trotskyists and social democrats such as Max Laufer, Ulrich Jacobs and Fritz Besser. There were also South Africans living in exile such as Pierre Watter, Richard McArthur and Stanley Trevor. The mathematicians Martin Davis, Jacob T. Schwartz and Harold S. Shapiro were also members. Another famous member is the anarchist Murray Bookchin.

== Programme ==
The Movement opposed having a rigid ideological programme, and its founders rejected the idea of giving "solemn assurances of promises". The nearest thing it had to a programme of ideals was Weber's contribution to Contemporary Issues in 1950, entitled "The Great Utopia". Ideologically, it opposed Western notions of parliamentary democracy and Soviet communism, seeing both "ideologies" as reinforcing one another. Yet the Movement for a Democracy of Content was not a political party in any conventional sense.

Its followers also rejected the traditionally leftist notion of "class struggle", instead believing that a "majority revolution" was possible. They hoped to undermine existing power structures by providing answers to a wide range of important, and frequently neglected, topics through the pages of Contemporary Issues.

Essays on topics such as the Aboriginal experience in Australia would often appear alongside articles discussing Diderot; while other writers would discuss everything from nuclear power and urban development to food biology. In the Issue 53, December 1988 of Dinge der Zeit, Paul Brass took a look back to 40 years of history of the Movement for a Democracy of Content.

== Activities ==
The Movement's influence on mainstream politics was marginal, and its leaders prone to feuding. However, it dedicated its energies to a number of important struggles in the 1950s. The German group was particularly active in opposing West German remilitarization. The New York City group campaigned hard in support of the 1956 Hungarian Uprising, while also causing a stir with Murray Bookchin's articles about synthetic chemicals in food.

The Johannesburg group, founded by Afrikaans poet and activist Vincent Swart and his wife Lillian, experienced particular success campaigning against the Apartheid government on several local issues. The most notable was the organisation and leadership shown by Dan Mokonyane during the 1957 Alexandra bus boycott. As part of one of six groups charged with organizing the Alexandra Township People's Transport Committee, Mokonyane successfully helped the people of the township to oppose a price hike by the local bus company.

== See also ==
- Murray Bookchin
- Direct democracy
- Economic democracy
- Inclusive democracy
- Historical materialism
- Dan Mokonyane
