= Ecology or Catastrophe =

2015 biography of Murray Bookchin by Janet Biehl

Ecology or Catastrophe: The Life of Murray Bookchin
- Author: Janet Biehl
- Language: English
- Subject: Murray Bookchin
- Publisher: Oxford University Press
- Publication date: 2015
- Publication place: United States
- Media type: Print (Hardcover)
- Pages: 344
- ISBN: 978-0199342488

Ecology or Catastrophe: The Life of Murray Bookchin is a 2015 biography of Murray Bookchin by Janet Biehl.
