= 1957 Alexandra bus boycott =

Bus boycott in Johannesburg, South Africa

The 1957 Alexandra bus boycott was a protest undertaken against the Public Utility Transport Corporation (PUTCO) by the people of Alexandra in Johannesburg, South Africa.

It is generally recognised as being one of the few successful political campaigns of the Apartheid era, by writers and activists such as Anthony Sampson and Chief Albert Luthuli.

Ruth First said of the Boycott: "not since the days of the Defiance Campaign had Africans held so strategic a position."

== Background ==
In 1940, South African authorities passed the Electoral Laws Amendment Act, the law provided for the compulsory registration of White voters only. During this time, the gap between family income did not meet the essential needs because of higher prices of rent, transport and taxes. Protests by the African Peoples Organization (APO) against this Act did not succeed. The ANC established a 'Department of Social Welfare' to investigate the needs of the increasingly urban population.

In 1940, the first major Alexandra bus boycott was held. In 1943, the bus fare increased from 5 cents to 6 cents; a new bus boycott took place in August 1943, with Nelson Mandela and tens of thousands of other protesters. They did not take a bus, but instead walked the 9 miles from Alexandra Township to the center of Johannesburg. A longer boycott took place in 1944, also in Alexandra, lasting seven weeks.

== "We will not ride" ==
The bus boycott of Alexandra was launched on 7 January 1957; but it was later joined by boycotters from Sophiatown and Newclare in western areas of Johannesburg. In Pretoria (Tshwane) it covered the Lady Selborne district, as well as other areas, including Atteridgeville, Mamelodi and Ga-Rankuwa. After two weeks, the boycott was joined by the commuters of Moroka-Jabavu in the south western areas who came out in sympathy. Many of the latter had moved from Moroka-Jabavu to Alexandra and had had the experiences of its earlier bus boycotts and other struggles.

The bus boycott lasted from January 1957 to June 1957. At its height, 70,000 township residents refused to ride the local buses to and from work. For many people, this daily journey to downtown Johannesburg was a 20 mi (32 km) round trip.

The boycott was named Azikwelwa (We will not ride). Alexandra Township had seen two previous bus boycotts. In August 1943, a nine-day boycott succeeded in reducing the fare from 5d to 4d. A second strike began in November 1944, after prices were again raised.

The 1957 protest was mobilised after PUTCO again proposed raising its fares from 4d to 5d. With the government refusing to increase its public subsidy to the company, PUTCO argued that a price hike was inevitable. On 7 January 1957, it was resolved by the people of Alexandra to launch the boycott and on the same day the Alexandra People's Transport Action Committee (APTAC) was formed. The boycott would continue until the four penny fare was restored.

== Organization ==
APTAC consisted of several local groups: the Standholders Association, the Standholders and Tenants Association, the Vigilants Association, the Tenants Association, the Freedom Charterists (members of the ANC), the Women's League (also members of the ANC), the African Nationalists and the Movement for a Democracy of Content. Throughout the boycott, the latter two groups maintained the most uncompromising stand, while the former groups showed themselves to be most willing to negotiate for a compromise.

Although each group committed three members to APTAC, as the boycott went on it was the radical groups who gained the upper hand. Dan Mokonyane of the Movement for a Democracy of Content, in particular, rose from initially acting as Publicity Secretary to the role of Secretary of APTAC.

== Victory ==
The boycott attracted daily attention from the South African press. The Johannesburg Chamber of Commerce, worried about the economic implications of a large part of its workforce walking twenty miles a day, attempted to settle the matter using various intermediaries.

Although several provisional settlements were discussed, including a complicated system that would reimburse bus passengers their extra penny every day, the boycotters stood firm. With the radical groups implicitly threatening to mobilise a strike (a rainy Monday) the Chamber of Commerce finally agreed to a public subsidy that would return the old fare on a long-term basis.

== See also ==
- PUTCO
- Montgomery bus boycott
- Human rights in South Africa
- Bristol Bus Boycott, 1963
