= The Ecology of Freedom =

1982 book by Murray Bookchin

The Ecology of Freedom: The Emergence and Dissolution of Hierarchy
- Cover of the first edition
- Author: Murray Bookchin
- Language: English
- Subject: Hierarchy
- Publisher: Cheshire Books
- Publication date: 1982
- Publication place: United States
- Media type: Print (Hardcover and Paperback)
- Pages: 480 (2005 edition)
- ISBN: 978-1904859260 (2005 edition)

The Ecology of Freedom: The Emergence and Dissolution of Hierarchy is a 1982 book by the American libertarian socialist and ecologist Murray Bookchin, in which the author describes his concept of social ecology, the idea that human social problems cause ecological problems and can be solved only by reorganizing society along ecological and ethical lines. The book is considered Bookchin's magnum opus, but it has also been criticized as utopian.

== Summary ==
Bookchin is critical of the class-centered analysis of Marxism and simplistic anti-state forms of libertarianism and liberalism and wishes to present a more complex view of societies. Bookchin writes that, "My use of the word hierarchy in the subtitle of this work is meant to be provocative. There is a strong theoretical need to contrast hierarchy with the more widespread use of the words class and State; careless use of these terms can produce a dangerous simplification of social reality. To use the words hierarchy, class, and State interchangeably, as many social theorists do, is insidious and obscurantist. This practice, in the name of a "classless" or "libertarian" society, could easily conceal the existence of hierarchical relationships and a hierarchical sensibility, both of which – even in the absence of economic exploitation or political coercion – would serve to perpetuate unfreedom."

Bookchin also points to an accumulation of hierarchical systems throughout history that has occurred up to contemporary societies, which tends to determine the human collective and individual psyche, "The objective history of the social structure becomes internalized as a subjective history of the psychic structure. Heinous as my view may be to modern Freudians, it is not the discipline of work but the discipline of rule that demands the repression of internal nature. This repression then extends outward to external nature as a mere object of rule and later of exploitation. This mentality permeates our individual psyches in a cumulative form up to the present day––not merely as capitalism but as the vast history of hierarchical society from its inception."

== Reception ==
=== Reviews ===
The Ecology of Freedom received a positive review from Susan Marie Szasz in Library Journal, a mixed review from Karen L. Field in American Anthropologist, and a negative review from the centrist political scientist Alan Wolfe in The Nation. An exchange of letters between Bookchin and Wolfe followed Wolfe's review. The book was also reviewed by R. Clarke in New Scientist and R. Williams in The Technology Review.

Szasz described the book as well written. Field wrote that Bookchin "reminds us of what humankind has been, warns us of what it is becoming, and dares us to imagine what it could be in a social structure geared to interdependence and environmental sensitivity rather than to competition and wanton destruction." She credited him with describing "essential differences in outlook between class and preclass societies", clarifying "the philosophical linkage between the propensities to objectify nature and to objectify one’s fellow human being", and providing a "valuable inventory of Western antiestablishment currents from the Adamites and Ranters to May 1968". However, she criticized his account of the emergence of civilization for its reliance on the anthropologists Paul Radin and Dorothy D. Lee, and found his description of preliterate societies oversimplified and "sanitized" in its emphasis on peaceful egalitarianism. She believed that he deliberately minimized "the importance of technoeconomic factors", and unconvincingly proposed "age stratification as the key to domination". She also maintained that parts of the work suffered from a "disappointing Eurocentrism", and that it failed to use recent literature on the place of technology in capitalist society.

Wolfe wrote that while he was receptive to a radical critique of society, he found the book "obsessive, dogmatic and angry" and did not believe it would gain as much attention as it deserved. He criticized Bookchin's negative attitude toward New Age views, his account of the development of modern society, and the hostile language he used to describe many authors with whom he disagreed. He believed the work was utopian and did not explain how to solve society's problems. Bookchin, in reply, accused Wolfe of ignoring its central themes. Wolfe responded by charging Bookchin with misrepresenting his critique; he also accused him of egocentrism.

=== Other evaluations ===
The anarchist author Ulrike Heider described The Ecology of Freedom as "a utopian work" in which the "social and political reality of the past, present, and future are pretty much faded out and capitalism is neither mentioned nor criticized". Bookchin responded in The Raven: Anarchist Quarterly, calling Heider's criticism unethical and distorting his views. He described Heider's assertion that he does not criticize capitalism as a fabrication. The philosopher Steven Best described The Ecology of Freedom as a classic, writing in Organization & Environment that, of Bookchin's books, it is the one that best captures the themes of his work as a whole. He credited Bookchin with making an influential critique of "Marxist historical narratives"; he noted that the book also influenced feminism. He complimented Bookchin for his interpretation of history. However, writing in 1998, he noted that some of Bookchin's claims were controversial, and that "Bookchin has evolved beyond certain positions" taken in the book. Brian Tokar wrote in Capitalism Nature Socialism that while The Ecology of Freedom "received high praise", it was also considered a "utopian social criticism".

The philosopher Andrew Light wrote that The Ecology of Freedom was "widely read by both theorists and practitioners in the ecological movement". He also suggested that it was Bookchin's best-known book. He credited Bookchin with providing an extensively developed and novel perspective on social domination, writing that it, "made Bookchin one of the most widely read ecological thinkers in the last thirty years." The activist Joel Kovel described the book as "Bookchin's most important work". However, he criticized Bookchin's treatment of Marx and Marxism. He compared The Ecology of Freedom to the Marxist humanist philosopher Raya Dunayevskaya's Rosa Luxemburg, Women's Liberation, and Marx's Philosophy of Revolution (1981). Still, he did not believe Bookchin would welcome the comparison. The political scientist Robyn Eckersley described the book as Bookchin's "magnum opus". The philosopher John Clark criticized Bookchin's discussion of politics, arguing that he provided "little detailed discussion of ecological situatedness and bioregional particularity, despite a theoretical commitment to such values."

Janet Biehl wrote that The Ecology of Freedom was one of Bookchin's most important books. She noted that while it has been regarded as Bookchin's magnum opus, she considers several of Bookchin's subsequent books at least equally important. She credited Bookchin with demonstrating that "the rise of hierarchy eroded the complementarity of relatively egalitarian communities long before the appearance of property ownership." However, she also wrote that while he was working on The Ecology of Freedom, Bookchin was influenced by a "New Age anthropology" that he later rejected. According to Biehl, he regretted its influence on the book.

Kurdish leader Abdullah Öcalan studied The Ecology of Freedom while in solitary confinement in a Turkish prison, and was reportedly impressed by the work, consequently issuing a manifesto titled Declaration of Democratic Confederalism in Kurdistan, which called on the Kurdistan Workers' Party to implement the ideas of social ecology.

== Bibliography ==
Books

- Biehl, Janet; Bookchin, Murray (1999). The Murray Bookchin Reader. Montréal: Black Rose Books. ISBN 978-1551641188.
- Bookchin, Murray (1982a). The Ecology of Freedom. Palo Alto: Cheshire Books. ISBN 978-0917352102.
- Clark, John (1998). "Municipal Dreams: A Social Ecological Critique of Bookchin's Politics". In Light, Andrew (ed.). Social Ecology after Bookchin. New York: The Guilford Press. ISBN 1-57230-379-4.
- Eckersley, Robyn (1998). "Divining Evolution and Respecting Evolution". In Light, Andrew (ed.). Social Ecology after Bookchin. New York: The Guilford Press. ISBN 1-57230-379-4.
- Heider, Ulrike (1994). Anarchism: Left, Right, and Green. San Francisco: City Lights Books. ISBN 978-0872862890.
- Kovel, Joel (1998). "Negating Bookchin". In Light, Andrew (ed.). Social Ecology after Bookchin. New York: The Guilford Press. ISBN 1-57230-379-4.
- Light, Andrew (1998). "Bookchin as/and Social Ecology". In Light, Andrew (ed.). Social Ecology after Bookchin. New York: The Guilford Press. ISBN 1-57230-379-4.

Journals

- Best, Steven (1998). "Murray Bookchin's Theory of Social Ecology: An Appraisal of 'The Ecology of Freedom'". Organization & Environment. 11 (3): 334–353. doi:10.1177/0921810698113004. ISSN 1086-0266. JSTOR 26161633. S2CID 145369736.
- Bookchin, Murray (1982b). "Letters". The Nation. 234 (25). – via EBSCO's Academic Search Complete (subscription required)
- Bookchin, Murray (1994). "A Meditation on Anarchist Ethics". The Raven: Anarchist Quarterly. 7 (4).
- Clarke, R. (1982). "Ecology of freedom". New Scientist. 96. – via EBSCO's Academic Search Complete (subscription required)
- Field, Karen L. (1984). "Review of The Ecology of Freedom: The Emergence and Dissolution of Hierarchy". American Anthropologist. 86 (1): 161–162. doi:10.1525/aa.1984.86.1.02a00290. ISSN 0002-7294. JSTOR 679413.
- Smith, Gregory B. (1983). "Review of The Ecology of Freedom: The Emergence and Dissolution of Hierarchy". The American Political Science Review. 77 (2): 540. doi:10.2307/1959025. ISSN 0003-0554. JSTOR 1959025.
- Szasz, Susan Marie (1982). "The Ecology of Freedom (Book)". Library Journal. 107 (14). – via EBSCO's Academic Search Complete (subscription required)
- Tokar, Brian (2008). "On Bookchin's Social Ecology and its Contributions to Social Movements". Capitalism Nature Socialism. 19 (1): 51–66. doi:10.1080/10455750701859430. S2CID 143576068. – via EBSCO's Academic Search Complete (subscription required)
- Williams, R. (1983). "Ecology of freedom". The Technology Review. 86. – via EBSCO's Academic Search Complete (subscription required)
- Wolfe, Alan (1982a). "Listen, Bookchin". The Nation. 234 (21). – via EBSCO's Academic Search Complete (subscription required)
- Wolfe, Alan (1982b). "Letters". The Nation. 234 (25). – via EBSCO's Academic Search Complete (subscription required)

Online articles

- Enzinna, Wes (November 24, 2015). "A Dream of Secular Utopia in ISIS' Backyard". The New York Times.
