= Dan Mokonyane =

Daniel Mogoasha Mokonyane (16 October 1930 – 16 October 2010) was a South African political revolutionary and (in exile) writer and legal academic. Latterly residing in London, he was best known for his leadership during the 1957 Alexandra bus boycott, one of the most successful single-issue campaigns undertaken during Apartheid.

== Political activism and professional life ==
Mokonyane was born in 1930 in Mothlabaneng, near Mahwelereng, in Limpopo province, in the Union of South Africa. After being expelled from boarding school in Polokwane for being argumentative about politics and the need for equality for all races, he moved to Alexandra Township in Johannesburg, living in a house owned by his father, to attend school in Soweto. He later majored in economics and philosophy at the University of Witwatersrand.

During his time at school, Mokonyane joined the Society of Young Africans (SOYA), a group aligned to the Non-European Unity Movement. He later left SOYA to join the Movement for a Democracy of Content. He met and discussed with many anti-apartheid leaders, including Nelson Mandela (African National Congress) and Robert Sobukwe (Pan Africanist Congress).

When the 1957 Alexandra bus boycott was announced, in protest against the local bus company's attempt to raise its fares, Mokonyane joined the boycott committee as Publicity Secretary and then later as the Secretary of the Organizing Committee.

He was frequently arrested and imprisoned during the campaign against the pass laws. In 1960, after the Sharpeville massacre, he was served with a Banishment Order from Alexandra township and fled from South Africa to the United Kingdom. He was appointed to a research position at the School of Oriental and African Studies in the University of London. He then studied for a law degree at the University of London, obtained a higher degree in human rights at the University of Kent and researched in planning law at the University of Wales. He eventually became a Senior Lecturer in Law at Middlesex University in North London, specialising in Jurisprudence. Despite increasing illness, he last visited South Africa in 2009.

== Publications ==
Mokonyane published two books. Lessons of Azikwelwa: the Bus Boycott in South Africa (1979, second edition 1994) is a first-hand account of the Alexandra bus boycott. The Big Sell-Out (1994) is a vehement critique of what Mokonyane saw as a contemptible failure by the Communist Party of South Africa and the African National Congress (and others) to translate the removal of Apartheid into improving the lot of the masses. Both books were reissued posthumously in 2011, in corrected reprints with new introductory material emphasising their continuing relevance to South African politics, as well as biographical material.

== Personal life ==
While in London, Mokonyane mixed closely with South African musicians in exile, such as Jabula, including his nephew, the guitarist Lucky Ranku.

He died in London.

Mokonyane's wife, Sue, predeceased him; he was survived by his partner, Mary. A memorial service for him was held in London and he was buried with a traditional funeral in Mahwelereng, where a brother and two sisters live.
