= Sandfontein =

Sandfontein Village
- Location within North West (South African province) Location within South Africa
- Coordinates: 25.189°S 27.267°E
- Country: South Africa
- Province: North West
- District: Bojanala Platinum
- Municipality: Moses Kotane

Area
  - Total: 7.09 km^{2} (2.74 sq mi)

Population (2011)
  - Total: 6,548
  - Density: 924/km^{2} (2,390/sq mi)

Racial makeup (2011)
  - Black African: 99.7%
  - Coloured: 0.1%
  - Indian/Asian: 0.2%

First languages (2011)
  - Tswana: 73.4%
  - Northern Sotho: 11.1%
  - Tsonga: 4.1%
  - Xhosa: 3.6%
  - Other: 7.8%
- Time zone: UTC+2 (SAST)
- PO box: 0708

Sandfontein is a town in Bojanala District Municipality in the North West province of South Africa.
