= Municipalism =

Local self-government political system

Libertarian municipalism is a political theory that developed out of the writings of American social theorist and philosopher Murray Bookchin. It advocates for establishing direct democratic systems within municipalities, such as towns and cities. It envisions these local communities as the foundation for an ecological society, where citizens actively manage social and economic affairs directly rather than relying on representatives. This approach encourages municipalities to join in confederations to collectively address larger regional issues, creating a network of interconnected communities focused on cooperation and mutual aid. Rooted in principles of direct democracy, decentralization, and libertarian communalism, this system is intended to serve as an alternative to centralized nation-states and corporate capitalism.

Bookchin argues that libertarian municipalism offers a pathway to address the ecological crisis by confronting the systems of domination embedded within current governance and resource distribution models. He contrasts this approach with past attempts to create a stateless society, critiquing traditional anarchism for its focus on non-political arenas like factories or cooperatives. In Bookchin's view, the municipality represents the ideal setting for building a true public sphere, revitalizing active citizenship, and strengthening community bonds. Ultimately, his concept of social ecology evolves into a coherent political theory emphasizing direct democracy, municipal organization, and a networked confederal system.

Carter in his booklet "How to Build Municipalist Communes" highlights that building municipalist communes involves creating local, self-governing communities using direct democracy, cooperative economics, and prefigurative politics to challenge state/capital power, focusing on neighborhood-level transformation through base-building, citizens' assemblies, and shared resources like community land trusts, often inspired by radical ideas of the "right to the city" and collective self-management.

== Overview ==
=== Municipalization as a foundation for an ecological society ===
Bookchin posits that neither privatization nor nationalization can effectively pave the way toward an ecological society. He asserts that both models are deeply embedded in structures of domination, failing to address the root causes of environmental crises. In contrast, Bookchin advocates for municipalization as a core principle in his libertarian municipalist framework.

=== Critique of privatization and nationalization ===
Bookchin critiques private property as a central driver of both social and ecological harm, associating it with exploitation, domination, and the prioritization of profit over community and environmental well-being. According to Bookchin, systems based on private ownership promote competition and individualism, which he argues are incompatible with the cooperation and solidarity needed to build a fair and sustainable society.

Nationalization, often positioned as a remedy to capitalism's excesses, is also seen by Bookchin as inadequate. He contends that nationalization typically shifts control from private companies to centralized bureaucratic entities, merely replacing one form of dominance with another. In this state-centered model, the apparatus of the state, rather than the market, assumes authority over economic activities. This can lead to what Bookchin describes as a "privatized economy in a collectivized form," where workers remain detached from their labor and ecological exploitation persists.

== History ==
During the French Revolution, sociétés révolutionnaire controlled municipal governments and established alliances between neighboring cities, forming a federation of hundreds of "municipalist republics" in south France known as communalism.

In Europe, the earliest forms of municipalism developed in the socialist parties. In 1881 the Federation of the Socialist Workers of France (a predecessor of the modern French Socialist Party) won control of the municipality of Commentry. In subsequent municipal elections, socialist candidates and parties increased the number of municipalities they controlled to 70 in 1892, and then over 100 in 1896. Meanwhile, in Italy, changes in electoral laws enabled the Italian Socialist Party to gain its first municipality, Imola, under the leadership of Andrea Costa.

Libertarian socialist and social ecologist thinker Murray Bookchin promoted what he called libertarian municipalism as the political branch of social ecology, focusing on the development of direct democracy within existing local governance structures. Bookchin argued that citizenship was a virtue that had become denatured by the dominance of late-stage capitalist nation states, and he viewed municipalism – particularly focused on popular, directly democratic assemblies as a form of municipal governance, as the key to reviving it:

Be they large or small, the initial assemblies and the movement that seeks to foster them in civic elections remain the only real school for citizenship that we have. There is no civic "curriculum" other than a living and creative political realm that can give rise to people who take management of public affairs seriously.

Bookchin has been one of the influences on a movement known as "new municipalism" in the twenty-first century, exemplified by Barcelona en Comú.
