= Soviet democracy =

Type of democracy in Marxism

Soviet democracy, also called council democracy, is a type of democracy in Marxism, in which the rule of a population is exercised by directly elected soviets (workers' councils). Soviets are directly responsible to their electors and bound by their instructions using a delegate model of representation. Such an imperative mandate is in contrast to a trustee model, in which elected delegates are exclusively responsible to their conscience. Delegates may accordingly be dismissed from their post at any time through recall elections. Soviet democracy forms the basis for the soviet republic system of government. A form of federalist council democracy is commonly supported among anarchist-communists and libertarian socialists, due to its emphasis on bottom-up self-administration.

In a soviet democracy, people are organized in basic units; for example, the workers of a company, the inhabitants of a district, or the soldiers of a barracks. They directly elect delegates as public functionaries, which act as legislators, government, and courts in one. Soviets are elected on several levels; at the residential and business level, delegates are sent through plenary assemblies to a local council which, in turn, delegates members to the next level. This system of delegation (indirect election) continues to a body such as the Congress of Soviets or the Supreme Soviet at the state level. The electoral processes thus take place from the bottom upward. The levels are usually tied to administrative levels. In contrast to earlier democratic models à la John Locke and Montesquieu, no separation of powers exists in soviet democracy.

Under Joseph Stalin, it has been widely argued that the soviets were transformed into undemocratic bodies representing the interests of party bureaucrats rather than the working class. However, other historians have argued that the soviet system retained participatory democracy.

== Definition ==
Kazuko Kawamoto writes that soviet democracy "may sound odd to many, especially in the younger generation, while to others in the older generation they may bring back memories of the 'good old' Cold War years, when they supported liberal democracy against Soviet socialist democracy, or vice versa. Many Cold War contemporaries thought that there was such a thing as soviet democratic theory, despite not believing the Soviet government's claim of the superiority of soviet democracy over liberal democracy."

The "totalitarian model" of Soviet and communist studies historiography, which was dominant during the Cold War, follows the view that soviet democracy was a farce and that "the Soviet regime was simply oppressive and totalitarian, and not democratic at all." Critics such as Zbigniew Brzezinski and Carl Joachim Friedrich often blamed the Soviet regime for "lacking liberty, which undermined the meaning of political participation." Nonetheless, "revisionist school" historians focused on the relatively autonomous institutions which might influence policy at the higher level, representing those who "insisted that the old image of the Soviet Union as a totalitarian state bent on world domination was oversimplified or just plain wrong. They tended to be interested in social history and to argue that the Communist Party leadership had to adjust to social forces."

Some scholars have had a differing view and attributed the establishment of the one-party system in the Soviet Union to the wartime conditions imposed on the Bolshevik government and others have highlighted the initial attempts to form a coalition government with the Left Socialist Revolutionaries. Specifically, Russian historian Vadim Rogovin wrote that the Bolsheviks made strenuous efforts to preserve the Soviet parties such as the Socialist-Revolutionaries, Mensheviks, and other left parties within the bounds of Soviet legality and their participation in the soviets on the condition of abandoning armed struggle against the Bolsheviks.

Kawamoto writes that "the Soviet government did encourage the working people to speak out. As numerous studies have shown, Soviet citizens responded by writing letters and visiting government offices to address the authorities, even if there were limits to the realization of their demands and the effectiveness of their entreaties." According to Kawamoto, these studies showed that "people demanded to be heard and the authorities responded, however insufficiently, because the ideas of democracy obligated them to do so." The reason why the process leading to the Soviet Constitution of 1936 took so long, about twenty years according to Kawamoto, was "deeply rooted in the ideas of Soviet democracy. The Soviet regime was democratic in its own sense of the word and this article gives it a more democratic face than what is usually imagined, especially among Western people. However, the regime's unique democratic character seemed to make it rather difficult to function adequately."

== History ==
=== Paris Commune ===
The Paris Commune in 1871 was described by Karl Marx as workers' councils, which select recall-able delegates to a higher assembly.

=== In Russia and the Soviet Union ===
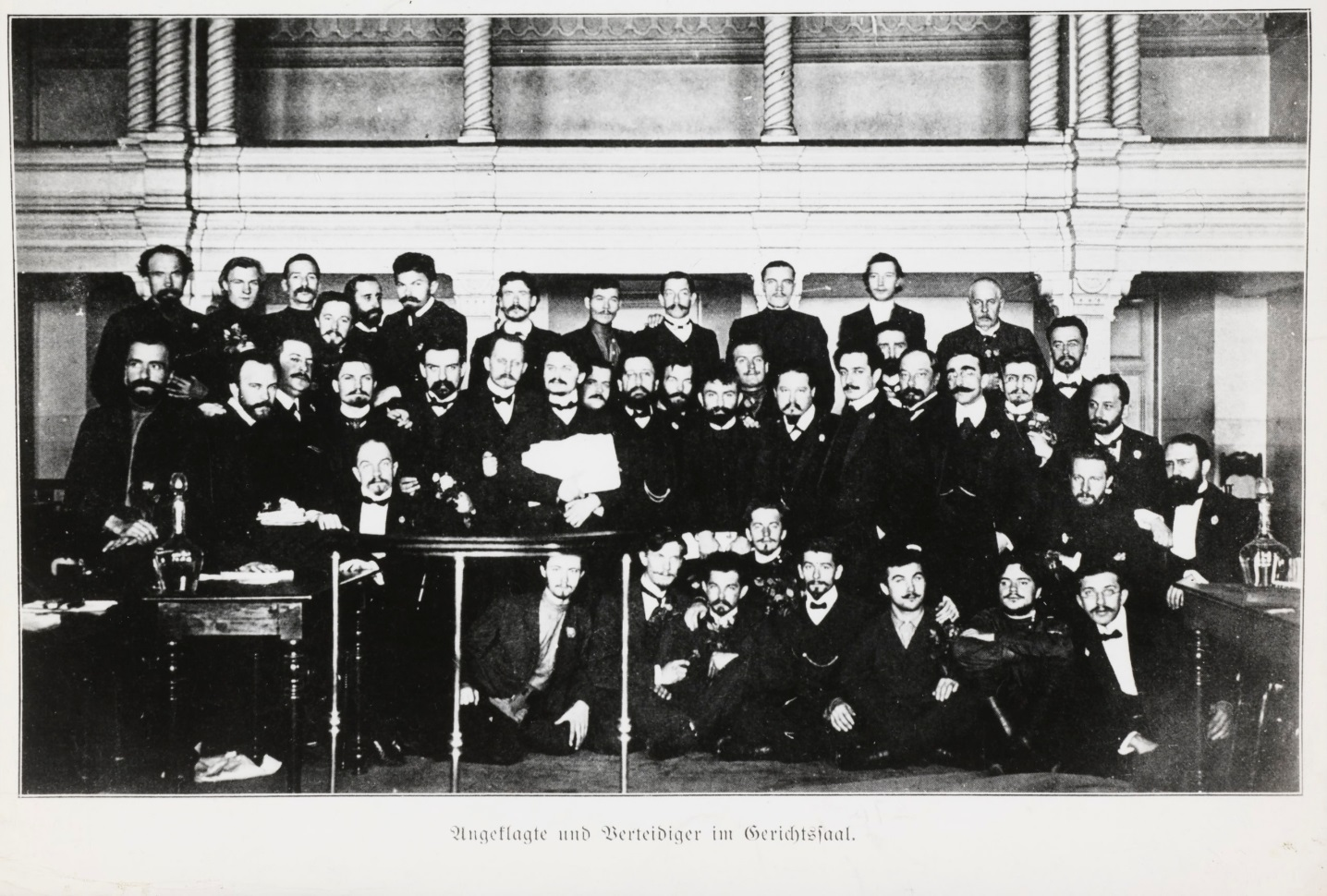
The Soviet of Workers' Deputies of St. Petersburg in 1905: Leon Trotsky in the center.

The first soviets, also called workers' councils, were formed after the 1905 Russian Revolution. Vladimir Lenin and the Bolsheviks saw the soviet as the basic organizing unit of society in a socialist system and supported this form of democracy. The soviets also played a considerable role in the Russian Revolution. At which time, they represented a variety of socialist parties in addition to Bolsheviks.

According to the official Soviet historiography, the first soviet was formed in May 1905 in Ivanovo (north-east of Moscow) during the 1905 Russian Revolution (Ivanovsky Soviet). In his memoirs, the Russian anarchist Volin claims that he witnessed the beginnings of the Saint Petersburg Soviet in January 1905. The Russian workers were largely organized at the turn of the 20th century, leading to a government-sponsored trade union leadership. In 1905, as the Russo-Japanese War (1904–1905) increased the strain on Russian industrial production, the workers began to strike and rebel. The soviets represented an autonomous workers' movement, one that broke free from the government's oversight of workers' unions. Soviets sprang up throughout the industrial centers of Russia, usually organized at the factory level. The soviets disappeared after the Revolution of 1905, but re-emerged under socialist leadership during the Russian Revolution. Lenin argued for the destruction of the foundations of the bourgeois state and its replacement with what David Priestland described as an "ultra-democratic" dictatorship of the proletariat based on the Paris Commune's system.

In post-revolutionary Russia local workers' soviets would elect representatives that go on to form regional soviets, which in turn elect representatives that form higher soviets, and so on up to the Congress of Soviets. Later the Supreme Soviet of the Soviet Union would become the highest legislative body of the entire country. After Lenin's party, the Bolsheviks, only got a minority of the votes in the election to the Russian Constituent Assembly, he disbanded it by force after its first meeting, citing the refusal of the Right Socialist Revolutionaries (SRs) and Mensheviks to honor the sovereignty of soviet democracy, arguing that a system in which parliamentary democracy was sovereign could not fairly represent the workers since it was in practice dominated by the bourgeoisie, that the proportional representation did not take into account the SR split, and that the soviets (where the Bolsheviks did get a majority) more accurately represented the opinion of the people, which had changed as shown in the elections to the soviets between the time of the elections to the Assembly and the first meeting of the Assembly. He also explicitly stated that soviet democracy did not include those considered bourgeois due to the "unscrupulous, self-seeking and sordid fight, the bourgeoisie waged against the Soviets; and...the overt participation of the bourgeoisie in the Kornilov mutiny [an attempted coup]—all this paved the way for the formal exclusion of the bourgeoisie from the Soviets.

The October Revolution was carried out by the soviets under the leadership of the Bolsheviks and the Left Socialist Revolutionaries. The latter would leave the government because they opposed the Brest-Litovsk peace agreement. After the revolution, the Bolsheviks had to defend the newly formed government in World War I and the Russian Civil War. According to some critics, many of the effects of the wars on the new Soviet government may be part of what led to the decline of soviet democracy in Russia (due to the authority the state took on in war time) and to the emergence of the bureaucratic structure that maintained much control throughout the history of the Soviet Union. Some believe that one key blow against soviet democracy occurred as early as March 1918, when all nineteen city soviets that were elected during the spring were disbanded in a series of Bolshevik coups d'état because workers returned Menshevik-SR majorities, or non-Bolshevik socialist majorities.

However, a key development in the course of soviet democracy in Russia occurred in March, 1921, with the Kronstadt rebellion. The outset of the year was marked by strikes and demonstrations - in both Moscow and Petrograd, as well as the countryside - due to discontent with the results of policies that made up war communism. The Bolsheviks, in response to the protests, enacted martial law and sent the Red Army to disperse the workers. This was followed up by mass arrests executed by the Cheka. Repression and minor concessions only temporarily quelled the discontent as Petrograd protests continued that year in March. This time, the factory workers were joined by sailors stationed on the nearby island-fort of Kronstadt. Disappointed in the direction of the Bolshevik government, the rebels demanded a series of reforms including a reduction in Bolshevik privileges, newly elected soviet councils to include socialist and anarchist groups, economic freedom for peasants and workers, dissolution of the bureaucratic governmental organs created during the civil war, and the restoration of workers' rights for the working class. The workers and sailors of the Kronstadt rebellion were promptly crushed by Red Army forces, with a thousand rebels killed in battle and another thousand executed the following weeks, with many more fleeing abroad and to the countryside. These events coincided with the 10th Congress of the Russian Communist Party (Bolsheviks). There, Lenin argued that the soviets and the principle of democratic centralism within the Bolshevik party still assured democracy. However, faced with support for Kronstadt within Bolshevik ranks, Lenin also issued a "temporary" ban on factions in the Russian Communist Party. This ban remained until the revolutions of 1989 and, according to some critics, made the democratic procedures within the party an empty formality, and helped Joseph Stalin to consolidate much more authority under the party. Soviets were transformed into the bureaucratic structure that existed for the rest of the history of the Soviet Union and were completely under the control of party officials and the politburo.

Russian historian Vadim Rogovin attributed the establishment of the one-party system to the conditions which were “imposed on Bolshevism by hostile political forces”. Rogovin highlighted the fact that the Bolsheviks made strenuous efforts to preserve the Soviet parties such as the Socialist-Revolutionaries, Mensheviks, and other left parties within the bounds of Soviet legality and their participation in the Soviets on the condition of abandoning armed struggle against the Bolsheviks. According to historian Marcel Liebman, Lenin's wartime measures such as banning opposition parties was prompted by the fact that several political parties either took up arms against the new Soviet government, or participated in sabotage, collaboration with the deposed Tsarists, or made assassination attempts against Lenin and other Bolshevik leaders. Liebman noted that opposition parties such as the Cadets and Mensheviks who were democratically elected to the Soviets in some areas, then proceeded to use their mandate to welcome in Tsarist and foreign capitalist military forces. In one incident in Baku, the British military, once invited in, proceeded to execute members of the Bolshevik Party who had peacefully stood down from the Soviet when they failed to win the elections. As a result, the Bolsheviks banned each opposition party when it turned against the Soviet government. In some cases, bans were lifted. This banning of parties did not have the same repressive character as later bans enforced under the Stalinist regime.

Trotsky also argued that he and Lenin had intended to lift the ban on the opposition parties such as the Mensheviks and Socialist Revolutionaries as soon as the economic and social conditions of Soviet Russia had improved. In exile, Trotsky condemned the Stalinist bureaucracy and called for a revival of Soviet democracy:

"Bureaucratic autocracy must give place to Soviet democracy. A restoration of the right of criticism, and a genuine freedom of elections, are necessary conditions for the further development of the country. This assumes a revival of freedom of Soviet parties, beginning with the party of Bolsheviks, and a resurrection of the trade unions. The bringing of democracy into industry means a radical revision of plans in the interests of toilers."

Other historians like Robert W. Thurston argue, while the top of the soviet system became largely bureaucratic, the local levels of society remained largely participatory. He writes "while sane, calm, and sober, no worker would have dared to say that socialism was a poor system or that Stalin was an idiot" but then goes on to argue that these bounds still allowed for citizens to have meaningful participation on their immediate situation and this local participation meant "ultimately relatively little was controlled by the government or party decree".

This is supported by some historical accounts such as that of Pat Sloan:

I have, while working in the Soviet Union, participated in an election. I, too, had a right to vote, as I was a working member of the community, and nationality and citizenship are no bar to electoral rights. The procedure was extremely simple. A general meeting of all the workers in our organisation was called. by the trade union committee, candidates were discussed, and a vote was taken by show of hands. Anybody present had the right to propose a candidate, and the one who was elected was not personally a member of the Party. In considering the claims of the candidates their past activities were discussed, they themselves had to answer questions as to their qualifications, anybody could express an opinion, for or against them, and the basis of all the discussion was: What justification had the candidates to represent their comrades on the local Soviet?

=== In Germany and the Weimar Republic ===
In October 1918, the constitution of the German Empire was reformed to give more powers to the elected parliament. On 29 October, rebellion broke out in Kiel among sailors. There, sailors, soldiers, and workers began electing workers' and soldiers' councils (Arbeiter- und Soldatenräte) modeled after the soviets of the Russian Revolution. The revolution spread throughout Germany, and participants seized military and civil powers in individual cities.

At the time, the Socialist movement which represented mostly laborers was split among two major left-wing parties: the Independent Social Democratic Party of Germany (USPD), which called for immediate peace negotiations and favored a soviet-style planned economy, and the Social Democratic Party of Germany (SPD), known at the time as the "Majority" Social Democratic Party of Germany (MSPD), which supported the war effort and favoured a parliamentary system. The rebellion caused great fear in the establishment and in the middle classes because of the revolutionary aspirations of the councils. It terrified the well-off classes as the country was on the brink of a working class revolution.

The Spartacus League, originally part of the USPD, split as a more radical group which advocated for violent proletarian revolution to establish communism. After the failed Spartacist Uprising, the Spartacist League became the Communist Party of Germany (KPD). The Communist Workers' Party of Germany (KAPD) split from the KPD as a distinct council communist tendency. Their main goal was an immediate abolition of bourgeois democracy and the constitution of a dictatorship of the proletariat through the seizure of power by the workers' councils. Communists in the KAPD formed the General Workers' Union of Germany (AAUD), who sought to form factory organizations as the basis of region wide workers' councils.

In view of the mass support for more radical reforms among the workers' councils, a coalition government called "Council of the People's Deputies" (Rat der Volksbeauftragten) was established, consisting of three MSPD and three USPD members. Led by Friedrich Ebert for the MSPD and Hugo Haase for the USPD it sought to act as a provisional cabinet of ministers. But the power question was unanswered. Although the new government was confirmed by the Berlin worker and soldier council, it was opposed by the Spartacus League. Ebert called for a "National Congress of Councils" (Reichsrätekongress), which took place from 16 to 20 December 1918, and in which the MSPD had the majority. Thus, Ebert was able to institute elections for a provisional National Assembly that would be given the task of writing a democratic constitution for parliamentary government, marginalizing the movement that called for a socialist republic.

In January, the Spartacus League and others in the streets of Berlin made more armed attempts to establish communism, known as the Spartacist uprising. Those attempts were put down by paramilitary Freikorps units consisting of volunteer soldiers. Bloody street fights culminated in the beating and shooting deaths of Rosa Luxemburg and Karl Liebknecht after their arrests on 15 January. With the affirmation of Ebert, those responsible were not tried before a court-martial, leading to lenient sentences, which made Ebert unpopular among radical leftists.

The National Assembly elections took place on 19 January 1919. In this time, the radical left-wing parties, including the USPD and KPD, were barely able to get themselves organised, leading to a solid majority of seats for the MSPD moderate forces. To avoid the ongoing fights in Berlin, the National Assembly convened in the city of Weimar, giving the future Republic its unofficial name. The Weimar Constitution created a republic under a semi-presidential system with the Reichstag elected by proportional representation. The parliamentary parties obtained a solid 80% of the vote.

During the debates in Weimar, fighting continued. The Bavarian Soviet Republic was declared in Munich, but was quickly put down by Freikorps and remnants of the regular army. The fall of the Munich Soviet Republic to these units, many of which were situated on the extreme right, resulted in the growth of far-right movements and organisations in Bavaria, including Organisation Consul, the Nazi Party, and societies of exiled Russian Monarchists. Sporadic fighting continued to flare up around the country. In eastern provinces, forces loyal to Germany's fallen monarchy fought the Republic, while militias of Polish nationalists fought for independence: the Greater Poland uprising in the Prussian Province of Posen and three Silesian Uprisings in Upper Silesia.

== See also ==
- Bibliography of the Russian Revolution and Civil War
- Outline of the Russian Revolution and Civil War
- Index of articles related to the Russian Revolution and Civil War
- Anarchist communism
- Council communism
- Demokratizatsiya (Soviet Union)
- Free soviets
- List of political parties in the Soviet Union
- New Democracy
- People's democracy (Marxism–Leninism)
- Socialist democracy
- Whole-process people's democracy

== Sources ==
- Avrich, Paul (1970). Kronstadt, 1921. Princeton, N.J.: Princeton University Press. ISBN 0-691-08721-0. OCLC 67322.
- Avrich, Paul (2004). Kronstadt, 1921 (in Spanish). Buenos Aires: Libros de Anarres. ISBN 9872087539.
- Chamberlin, William Henry (1965). The Russian Revolution, 1917–1921. Princeton, N.J.: Grosset & Dunlap. OCLC 614679071.
- Daniels, Robert V. (December 1951). "The Kronstadt Revolt of 1921: A Study in the Dynamics of Revolution". American Slavic and East European Review. 10 (4): 241–254. doi:10.2307/2492031. ISSN 1049-7544. JSTOR 2492031.
- Figes, Orlando (1997). A People's Tragedy: A History of the Russian Revolution. New York: Viking. ISBN 978-0-670-85916-0. OCLC 36496487.
