= Stepan Petrichenko =

Russian anarcho-syndicalist revolutionary (1892–1947)

- Степан Петриченко
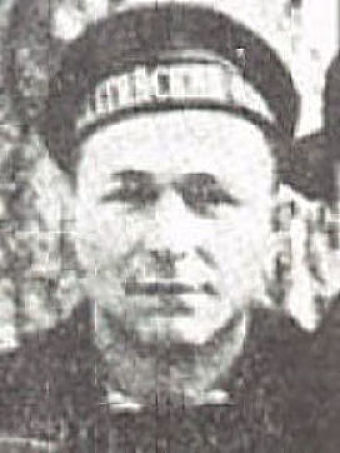
- Petrichenko in 1921

Chairman of the Soviet Republic of Soldiers and Fortress-Builders of Naissaar
- In office December 17, 1917 – February 26, 1918
- Preceded by: Office established
- Succeeded by: Office abolished

Personal details
- Born: Stepan Maximovich Petrichenko; 1892 Nikitenka, Zhizdrinsky Uyezd, Kaluga Governorate, Russian Empire
- Died: June 2, 1947 (aged 55) Vladimir Prison, Vladimir, Russian SFSR, Soviet Union
- Profession: Politician, revolutionary

Military service
- Allegiance: Russian Empire; Naissaar; RSFSR; Kronstadt; Soviet Union
- Years of service: 1913–1917; 1917–1918; 1918–1921; 1921; 1922–1941
- Battles/wars: First World War; Russian Civil War; Kronstadt rebellion

Stepan Maximovich Petrichenko (Russian: Степан Максимович Петриченко; 1892 – June 2, 1947) was a Russian revolutionary, an anarchist politician, the head of the self-styled "Soviet Republic of Soldiers and Fortress-Builders of Naissaar" and in 1921, de facto leader of the Kronstadt Commune, and the leader of the revolutionary committee which led the Kronstadt rebellion of 1921.

== Life ==
=== Early years ===
Stepan Maximovich Petrichenko was born in 1892 in the village of Nikitenka in the Zhizdrinsky Uyezd of Kaluga Governorate to a family of peasants. Two years after his birth, his family moved to Alexandrovsk (Yekaterinoslav Governorate), where Stepan graduated from city school and joined the local ironworks as a metalworker. In 1913 Petrichenko was called up for military service with the Russian navy, where he was assigned to the Russian battleship Petropavlovsk, part of the Baltic Fleet.

=== Soviet republic of sailors and builders ===
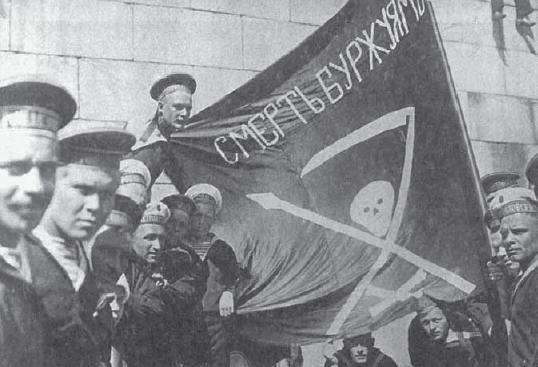
Sailors of the Petropavlovsk in Helsinki, before the Finnish Civil War (Summer 1917); Flag calls for "death to the bourgeoisie".

During the 1917 February Revolution in Russia, Petrichenko had been based with a unit of the Russian fleet at the small Estonian island of Naissaar (Nargen) in the Tallinn Bay. In December 1917, Petrichenko and 81 Russian sailors proclaimed the "Soviet Republic of Soldiers and Fortress-Builders of Nargen" on the island. They organized a local military mini-government which, without much resistance from the island's two hundred indigenous civilian residents, ruled over the island for about two months until the capture of the nearby Estonian capital city Tallinn (Reval) by the forces of the German Empire on February 26, 1918. The red and black flag of the anarcho-communists was lowered, and its "government" retreated onto the ships of the Soviet Baltic Fleet, heading for Helsinki (Helsingfors), and from there to Kronstadt. Three years later, Petrichenko led the Kronstadt uprising against the new Bolshevik government of Soviet Russia.

=== Kronstadt rebellion ===
After the rebellion was put down by Trotsky, Petrichenko fled over the ice to Finland, where he continued his agitation against the Bolsheviks. Petrichenko had attempted to join the White Army but was turned away due to his previous Bolshevik membership.

=== Emigrant ===
Petrichenko remained in exile in Finland for almost 25 years, where his regard from fellow rebels remained high.

He blocked further emigration to Helsinki, instead sending Kronstadt "volunteers" to Soviet Karelia to organize an uprising. He called on Kronstadters to not obey the order of General Wrangel, and refuse inclusion in the White Army. When an amnesty was declared for the ordinary participants in the uprising, by the decree of the All-Russian Central Executive Committee, Petrichenko did not put obstacles in the way of those who wanted to return to their homeland and decided to ask for permission to return himself. Soon, the police chief of Vyborg received a denunciation of the "vile plot" of Petrichenko, as a result of which, on May 21, 1922, he was arrested and spent several months in prison.

=== Agent ===
In 1922, Petrichenko went to Riga and visited the embassy of the Russian Soviet Federative Socialist Republic. There he was recruited by the State Political Directorate and became an agent of the Red Army Intelligence Agency in Finland. In August 1927, Petrichenko again arrived in Riga and at the Soviet embassy filed an application addressed to Mikhail Kalinin with a request to return to Soviet citizenship. In 1927, Petrichenko traveled through Latvia to the USSR. Returning to Finland, he got a job at a pulp mill in Kemi, where he worked until 1931. He was eventually fired from the factory and moved to live in Helsinki. In 1937, he announced his refusal to cooperate with Soviet intelligence, but then again agreed to continue working with them. He stayed in Finland for years, until he came into conflict with the Finnish government over his support of Soviet groups during the Winter War between the Soviet Union and Finland in 1940. In 1941, Petrichenko was arrested by the Finnish authorities.

=== Arrest and death ===
On September 25, 1944, on the basis of an armistice agreement between the USSR, Great Britain and Finland, Petrichenko was released, and on April 21, 1945, he was again arrested and sent to the USSR, as part of a group of persons known as the "Prisoners of Leino", a list of political enemies and alleged military collaborators compiled by Soviet members of Allied Commission. The investigation into Petrichenko was transferred from the police to the NKVD where it was examined without the presence of the prosecution or the defense. The verdict passed on November 17, 1945, read:

Petrichenko, Stepan Maximovich, for participation in a counter-revolutionary terrorist organization and belonging to Finnish intelligence, is to be imprisoned in a forced labor camp for a period of 10 years, counting the period from April 24, 1945.

Stepan Petrichenko died on June 2, 1947, during his transfer from the Solikamsk labor camp to the Vladimir Central Prison.

== Work ==
- Petrichenko, Stepan (1921). Pravda o kronshtadtskikh sobytiiakh. (Russian: Правда о кронштадтских событиях) (bibrec); English: The truth about the Kronstadt events

== Bibliography ==
- Avrich, Paul (1970). Kronstadt, 1921. Princeton, N.J.: Princeton University Press. ISBN 0-691-08721-0. OCLC 67322.
