= Sasha and Emma =

2012 history book by Paul Avrich and Karen Avrich

- First edition
- Author: Paul and Karen Avrich
- Subject: Biography, anarchism, 19th and 20th century history
- Published: November 2012 (Belknap Press)
- Pages: 528
- ISBN: 9780674065987

Sasha and Emma: The Anarchist Odyssey of Alexander Berkman and Emma Goldman is a 2012 history book about Alexander Berkman and Emma Goldman. The book was co-authored by the father-daughter pair Paul and Karen Avrich, and posthumously published after Paul's death. It was a New York Times Book Review Editors' Choice for 2012.

== Summary ==
Sasha and Emma is a dual biography of anarchists Alexander "Sasha" Berkman and Emma Goldman. The authors contrast their personalities, beliefs, and public image over their 50-year relationship. The book, presented in three parts, covers the history of radicalism in the United States and Europe over a 70-year period.

The first part, in alternating, parallel sections, tells how Berkman and Goldman came to radicalism: Berkman as a poor worker and Goldman leaving a marriage, both drawn to the Haymarket affair defendants. They met in New York City's anarchist community under Johann Most. After Berkman's failed attentat on industrialist Henry Clay Frick, Berkman spent 14 years in prison, as the authors contrast his declining health, regret over failing to foment revolution against Goldman's own nascent infamy and feelings of belonging in the United States.

Following his release from prison, the second part follows Berkman and Goldman's reunion and their political and personal lives. Berkman struggles to reintegrate and works to forge his own identity by publishing his prison memoirs and a journal, The Blast, while Goldman continues her public speaking and Mother Earth journal. The authors emphasize the support network behind their radical work and the historical context of American radicalism in the era, including the Ludlow Massacre, Preparedness Day bombing, and increased targeting of radicals with the onset of the World War I. The pair were ultimately deported for their anti-draft activism.

The third part follows Berkman and Goldman's aspirations for the Bolshevik Revolution and subsequent disillusionment, particularly after the Kronstadt rebellion and Bolshevik persecution of anarchists. Fleeing Russia for exile in Switzerland, Germany, and France, the authors explore Goldman's feeling of connection to the United States and desire to return in contrast with Berkman's who felt at home in no country.

== Publication ==
Historian Paul Avrich died in 2006 with his manuscript for a dual biography of Goldman and Berkman unfinished. It was his 11th book and included 40 years of research. His daughter, Karen, spent six years finishing the book for publication in 2012.

== Sources ==
- Adams, Matthew (August 2013). "Sasha and Emma: The Anarchist Odyssey of Alexander Berkman and Emma Goldman". Reviews in History. doi:10.14296/RiH/issn.1749.8155. hdl:10197/10191. ISSN 1749-8155. Archived from the original on April 15, 2024.
- Barcousky, Len (January 20, 2013). "'Sasha and Emma': empathy for the famed anarchists". Pittsburgh Post-Gazette.
- Christensen, Bryce (2012). "Sasha and Emma: The Anarchist Odyssey of Alexander Berkman and Emma Goldman". Booklist. 109 (3): 7. ISSN 0006-7385. EBSCOhost 82178322.
- Cole, Stephen (December 2013). "Sasha and Emma: The Anarchist Odyssey of Alexander Berkman and Emma Goldman". Journal of American History. 100 (3): 861–862. doi:10.1093/jahist/jat463. ISSN 0021-8723.
- Dixler, Elsa (December 9, 2012). "Anarchy in the U.S.A." New York Times Book Review: 16. ISSN 0028-7806.
- Gurstein, Rochelle (December 2012). "Acting Up". Bookforum. 19 (4): 8–43. ISSN 1098-3376.
- Martin, T. S. (May 2013). "Sasha and Emma: the anarchist odyssey of Alexander Berkman and Emma Goldman". Choice: Current Reviews for Academic Libraries. 50 (9): 1695. ISSN 0009-4978. ProQuest 1355713474.
- Miller, Robin Feuer (November 8, 2012). "A dialectical relationship". Times Higher Education (2075): 48–49. ISSN 0049-3929. ProQuest 1266286124.
- Murphy, John L. (October 25, 2012). "Violent Dreams of Peace from a Passionate Pair: 'Sasha and Emma'". PopMatters.
- Orr, Suzanne (April 11, 2017). "Sasha and Emma: The Anarchist Odyssey of Alexander Berkman and Emma Goldman by Paul Avrich and Karen Avrich (review)". Journal for the Study of Radicalism. 11 (1): 191–193. doi:10.14321/jstudradi.11.1.0191. ISSN 1930-1197. S2CID 148642954 – via Project MUSE.
- Palmer, Bryan D. (2013). "Sasha and Emma: The Anarchist Odyssey of Alexander Berkman and Emma Goldman". Labour / Le Travail. 72: 370–372. ISSN 0700-3862. EBSCOhost 92750686.
- Roberts, Sam (November 18, 2012). "Friends, Lovers and Anarchists". The New York Times. p. CT4. ISSN 0362-4331. ProQuest 1705738599.
- "Sasha and Emma: The Anarchist Odyssey of Alexander Berkman and Emma Goldman". Publishers Weekly. 259 (26): 159. June 25, 2012. ISSN 0000-0019.
- "Editors' Choice". The New York Times. December 14, 2012. ISSN 0362-4331.
