= The Anarchists in the Russian Revolution =

1973 book by Paul Avrich

- First edition
- Author: Paul Avrich
- Subject: Russian history, anarchism
- Published: 1973 (Cornell University Press)
- Pages: 179
- ISBN: 9780801407802

The Anarchists in the Russian Revolution is a 1973 history book by Paul Avrich and collection of primary sources about the role of Russian anarchists during the Russian revolution.
