= Vitovt Putna =

Soviet Red Army officer (1893–1937)

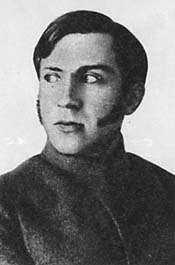
- Vitovt Putna
- Born: March 31, 1893; Mackonys, Vilna Governorate, Russian Empire (now Utena County, Lithuania
- Died: June 12, 1937 (aged 44); Moscow, Russian SFSR, USSR
- Military career
- Allegiance: Russian Empire (1915–1917); Soviet Russia (1918–1922); Soviet Union (1922–1937)
- Service years: 1915–1937
- Rank: Komkor
- Conflicts: World War I Russian Civil War; Polish–Soviet War; Kronstadt rebellion
- Awards: Order of the Red Banner (Three times)

Vitovt Kazimirovich Putna (Russian: Ви́товт Казими́рович Пу́тна, Lithuanian: Vytautas Putna; 31 March 1893 – 12 June 1937) was a Soviet Red Army officer of Lithuanian origin.

A World War I veteran of the Imperial Russian Army and Bolshevik since 1917, Putna was a komdiv during the Polish–Soviet War and commanded a variety of divisions. During the retreat following the Battle of Warsaw, he gathered around him ad-hoc corps out of defeated units and enabled the remnants of the Red Army to escape from a large cauldron near Białystok. In 1921, he took part in suppressing the Kronstadt rebellion and Peasant uprisings on the Lower Volga. In 1923, he was sent as a military advisor to China and between 1927 and 1931, he was military attaché to Japan, Finland, and Germany. He was posted to the Far East Military district in 1931 and was made military attaché to Great Britain in 1934.

He was promoted to comcor in 1935. Putna was arrested during the Great Purge on 20 August 1936, tried for alleged espionage and anti-Soviet activities together with Mikhail Tukhachevsky in the so-called Case of Trotskyist Anti-Soviet Military Organization, sentenced to death on 11 June 1937, and executed the next day.

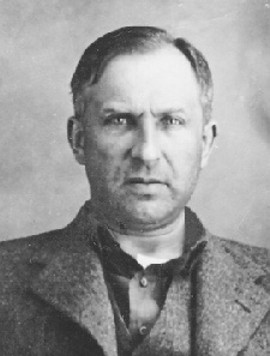
Vitovt Putna after arrest by NKVD 1936

The Soviet government posthumously exonerated him after Joseph Stalin's death, when he was formally rehabilitated in 1957.
