= Kronstadt, 1921 =

1970 history book by Paul Avrich

- Cover of the first edition (1970)
- Author: Paul Avrich
- Subject: Russian history
- Publisher: Princeton University Press
- Publication date: March 21, 1970
- Pages: 288
- ISBN: 9780691630502

Kronstadt, 1921, is a history book by Paul Avrich about the 1921 Kronstadt rebellion against the Bolsheviks.

In a 2003 bibliography of the era, Jon Smele summarized the book as, "masterfully written" and "the only full-length, scholarly, non-partisan account of the genesis, course and repression of the rebellion to have appeared in English."
