= Paul Avrich =

American historian of anarchism (1931–2006)

- Avrich, c. 1980
- Born: August 4, 1931; New York City, U.S.
- Died: February 16, 2006 (aged 74); New York City, U.S.
- Occupation: Historian
- Years active: 1961–1999
- Notable work: The Haymarket Tragedy, Anarchist Voices

Paul Avrich (August 4, 1931 – February 16, 2006) was an American historian specializing in the 19th and early 20th-century anarchist movement in Russia and the United States. He taught at Queens College, City University of New York, for his entire career, from 1961 to his retirement as distinguished professor of history in 1999. He wrote ten books, mostly about anarchism, including topics such as the 1886 Haymarket Riot, the 1921 Sacco and Vanzetti case, the 1921 Kronstadt naval base rebellion, and an oral history of the movement in the United States.

As an ally of the movement's major figures, he sought to challenge the portrayal of anarchists as amoral and violent, and collected papers from these figures that he donated as a 20,000-item collection to the Library of Congress.

== Early and personal life ==
Paul Avrich was born August 4, 1931, in Brooklyn, New York City, to parents of Jewish and Ukrainian heritage from Odessa. His parents – Rose (née Zapol) and Murray Avrich – were a Yiddish theater actress and a dress manufacturer, respectively. In the early 1950s, he served in the Korean War with the U.S. Air Force. Avrich completed his undergraduate studies at Cornell University in 1952, and his graduate studies at Columbia University in 1961. His doctoral dissertation addressed the labor movement in the Russian Revolution. Avrich was among the first American exchange students to study in the Soviet Union when it opened during the Khrushchev Thaw. Anarchists he met through his research into the anarchist Yiddish newspaper Freie Arbeiter Stimme sparked his interest in the movement. He later named his cats after Mikhail Bakunin and Piotr Kropotkin. Avrich was married and had two daughters and a sister.

== Career ==
As a teacher and historian of the anarchist movement, Avrich had sympathy and affection for the cause and became a trusted colleague of its major figures. Accordingly, he sought to communicate to his students an affection and solidarity for anarchists "as people, rather than as militants" and challenged the perception of anarchists as amoral and violent. He wanted his work to resurrect the thought of marginalized anarchists, whom he saw as "pioneers of social justice" worth revisiting in the revival of libertarianism following the Vietnam War and second-wave feminism.

Avrich joined Queens College as a Russian history instructor in 1961, where he remained for the duration of his career, though he also was a member of the City University of New York Graduate Center faculty. He received a Guggenheim Fellowship for Russian history in 1967 and a National Endowment for the Humanities Fellowship in 1972. When named a distinguished professor of history in 1982, his announcement quoted him: "Every good person deep down is an anarchist." He retired in 1999. Avrich collected books, photos, and papers from key anarchists and donated a 20,000-item collection to the Library of Congress. He died on February 16, 2006, in Manhattan's Mount Sinai Hospital from complications due to Alzheimer's disease.

His Soviet research and documents on the suppressed Kronstadt insurrection led to several books on anarchists in the Russian revolution, including Kronstadt, 1921. He interviewed Soviet exiles in New York, where he first met members of the Freie Arbeiter Stimme. Avrich then moved to major figures in American anarchism and published a book in 1980 on the Ferrer Schools inspired by Francisco Ferrer. His 1984 book on the Haymarket Riot won the Philip Taft Labor History Book Award, and his 1991 book on Sacco and Vanzetti presented the pair as revolutionaries rather than philosophical anarchists. Avrich's last book, in 1995, compiled 30 years of interviews across the anarchist movement. Several of his works were nominated for Pulitzer Prizes.

== Works ==
- The Russian Anarchists (1967)
- Kronstadt, 1921 (1970)
- Russian Rebels, 1600–1800 (1972)
- The Anarchists in the Russian Revolution (1973)
- An American Anarchist: The Life of Voltairine de Cleyre (1978)
- The Modern School Movement: Anarchism and Education in the United States (1980)
- The Haymarket Tragedy (1984)
- Anarchist Portraits (1988)
- Sacco and Vanzetti: The Anarchist Background (1991)
- Anarchist Voices: An Oral History of Anarchism in America (1995)
- Sasha and Emma: The Anarchist Odyssey of Alexander Berkman and Emma Goldman (2012) [co-authored with his daughter, Karen Avrich]
