= Kronstadt rebellion =

1921 anti-Bolshevik revolt in Russia

- Part of the Russian Civil War
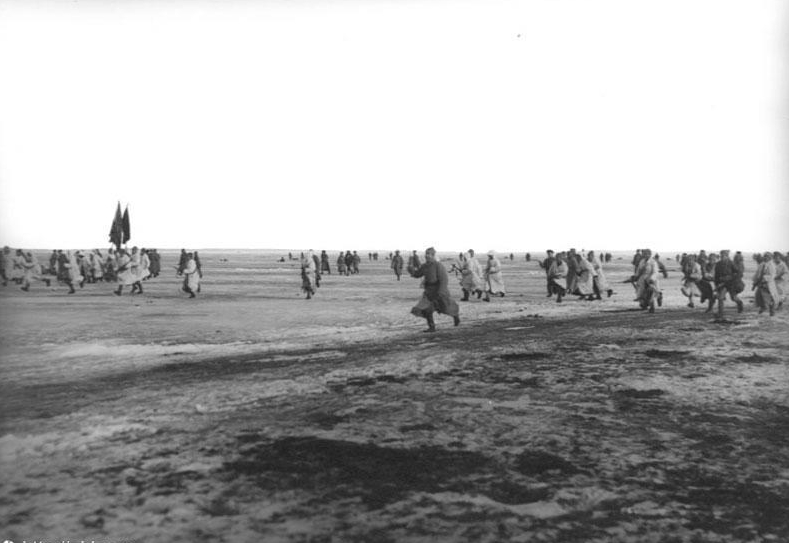
- Loyalist Red Army soldiers on the frozen Gulf of Finland attacking the island fortress of Kronstadt
Date	1–18 March 1921
Location	Kronstadt, Kotlin Island, Russia 60°00′45″N 29°44′01″E
Result	Bolshevik victory

Belligerents
Kronstadt rebels: Baltic Fleet	Russian SFSR

Commanders and leaders
Stepan Petrichenko	Vladimir Lenin; Leon Trotsky; Grigory Zinoviev; Kliment Voroshilov; Mikhail Tukhachevsky

Strength
First assault: 11,000; Second assault: 17,961	First assault: 10,073; Second assault: 25,000‍–‍30,000

Casualties and losses
Around 1,000 KIA; 1,200‍–‍2,168 executed	Second assault: 527‍–‍1,412; Much higher including the first assault

The Kronstadt rebellion (Russian: Кронштадтское восстание, romanized: Kronshtadtskoye vosstaniye) was a 1921 insurrection of Soviet sailors, naval infantry, and civilians against the Bolshevik government in the Russian port city of Kronstadt. Located on Kotlin Island in the Gulf of Finland, Kronstadt defended the former capital city, Petrograd (now Saint Petersburg), as the base of the Baltic Fleet. For sixteen days in March 1921, rebels in Kronstadt's naval fortress rose in opposition to the Soviet government which they had helped to consolidate.

Disappointed in the direction of the Bolshevik government, the rebels—whom Leon Trotsky himself had praised earlier as the "adornment and pride of the revolution"—demanded a series of reforms: reduction in Bolshevik power, newly elected soviets (councils) to include socialist and anarchist groups, economic freedom for peasants and workers, dissolution of the bureaucratic governmental organs created during the civil war, and the restoration of civil rights for the working class. Trotsky signed the order to crush the rebellion which outlined a series of operational measures including a warning to the sailors to stop the rebellion in advance of a Red Army assault. However, he did not personally participate in the military operations or repressions which were organized by Felix Dzerzhinsky.

Convinced of the popularity of the reforms they were fighting for (which they partially tried to implement during the revolt), the Kronstadt seamen waited in vain for the support of the population in the rest of the country and rejected aid from émigrés. Although the council of officers advocated a more offensive strategy, the rebels maintained a passive attitude as they waited for the government to take the first step in negotiations. By contrast, the authorities took an uncompromising stance, presenting an ultimatum demanding unconditional surrender on 5 March. Once this period expired, the Bolsheviks raided the island several times and suppressed the revolt on 18 March after shooting and imprisoning several thousand rebels.

Supporters saw the rebels as revolutionary martyrs while the authorities saw the rebels as "agents of the Entente and counter-revolution." The Bolshevik response to the revolt caused great controversy and was responsible for the disillusionment of several supporters of the Bolshevik regime, such as Emma Goldman. While the revolt was suppressed and the rebels' political demands were not met, it served to accelerate the implementation of the New Economic Policy, which replaced war communism. According to Lenin, the crisis was the most critical the Bolsheviks had yet faced, "undoubtedly more dangerous than Denikin, Yudenich, and Kolchak combined".

== Background ==
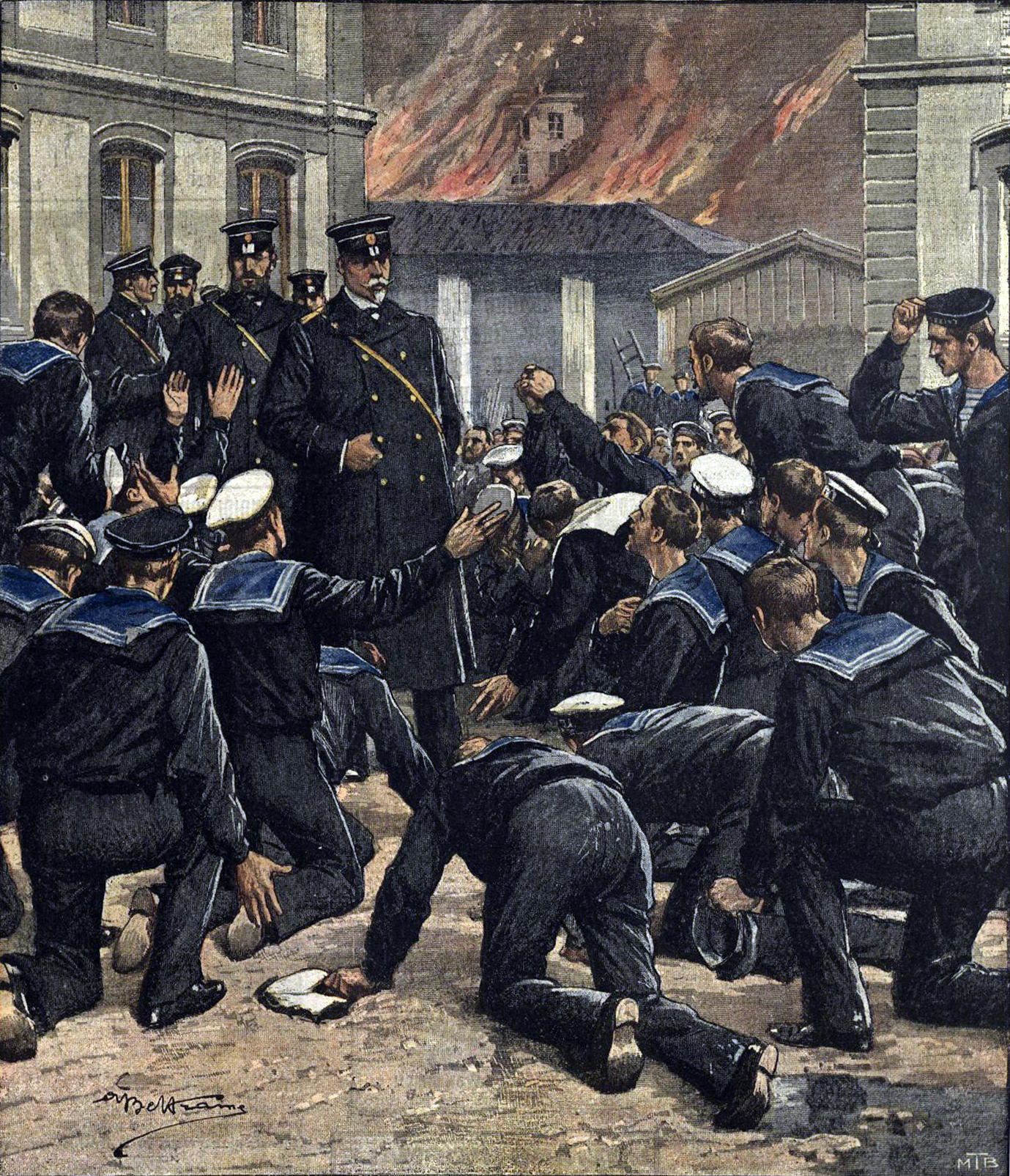
Prior to 1917, Kronstadt sailors revolted in 1905 (depicted) and 1906

As the Russian Civil War wound down in late 1920, the Bolsheviks presided over a nation in ruin. Their communist Red Army had defeated Pyotr Wrangel's anti-communist White Army, and was militarily equipped to suppress outstanding peasant insurrections, but faced mass disillusionment from unbearable living conditions—famine, disease, cold, and weariness—induced by the years of war and exacerbated by the Bolshevik policy of war communism. Peasants had started to resent government requisitions of grain, with seizures of their already meager harvest being coupled with cutbacks on bread rations and a fuel shortage.

Despite military victory and stabilized foreign relations, Russia faced a serious social and economic crisis. As foreign troops began to withdraw, Bolshevik leaders continued to sustain tight control of the economy through the policy of war communism. Discontent grew among the Russian populace, particularly the peasantry, who felt disadvantaged by government grain requisitioning (prodrazvyorstka, the forced seizure of large portions of the peasants' grain crop used to feed urban dwellers). In resistance of these policies, peasants began refusing to till their farms. In February 1921, the Cheka reported 155 peasant uprisings across Russia. The workers in Petrograd were also involved in a series of strikes, caused by the reduction of bread rations by one third over a ten-day period. With this information and already stoked discontent, the revolt at the Kronstadt naval base began as a protest over the plight of the country. Agricultural and industrial production had been drastically reduced and the transport system was disorganized.

The arrival of winter and the maintenance of "war communism" and various deprivations by Bolshevik authorities led to increased tensions in the countryside (as in the Tambov Uprising) and in the cities, especially Moscow and Petrograd—where strikes and demonstrations took place—in early 1921. Due to the maintenance and reinforcement of "war communism", living conditions worsened even more after the fighting ended.

== Preface ==
Protests followed a January 1921 announcement in which the government reduced bread rations by one third for inhabitants of all cities. While this decision was forced, between heavy snow and fuel shortages preventing stored food transport in Siberia and the Caucasus, this justification did not prevent popular discontent. In mid-February, workers began to rally in Moscow; such demonstrations were preceded by workers' meetings in factories and workshops. The workers demanded the end of "war communism" and a return to free labor. The government's representatives could not alleviate the situation, and it quickly decided that the revolts could only be suppressed by armed troops.

When the situation seemed to calm down in Moscow, protests broke out in Petrograd, where about 60% of large factories closed in February due to lack of fuel and food supplies had virtually disappeared. As in Moscow, demonstrations and demands were preceded by meetings in factories and workshops. Faced with a shortage of government food rations and despite a ban on trade, workers organized expeditions to fetch supplies in rural areas near cities. They became unhappier when the authorities tried to stop this. In late February, a meeting at the small Trubochny factory decided to increase rations and immediately distribute winter clothes and shoes that were reportedly reserved for Bolsheviks. Workers called a protest the following day. The local Bolshevik-controlled soviet sent cadets to disperse the protesters. Grigori Zinoviev established a "Defense Committee" with special powers to end the protests; similar structures were created in the various districts of the city in the form of troikas. The provincial Bolsheviks mobilized to deal with the crisis.

New demonstrations by Trubochny workers followed and this time spread throughout the city, in part because of rumors about the repression of the previous demonstration. Faced with growing protests, the local soviet closed factories with high concentrations of protesters, which further intensified the movement. The economic demands became political in nature, which was of great concern to the Bolsheviks. To definitively end the protests, the authorities flooded the city with Red Army troops, tried to close even more protest-affiliated factories, and proclaimed martial law. The Bolsheviks started a detention campaign, carried out by the Cheka, resulting in thousands of arrests: thousands of students and intellectuals, about 500 workers and union leaders, and a few anarchists, Socialist Revolutionaries, and key leaders of the Mensheviks. The authorities urged workers to return to work to prevent spillage of blood. They granted certain concessions: permission to go to the countryside to bring food to cities, relaxation of controls against speculation, permission to buy coal to alleviate fuel shortages, an end to grain confiscations, and increased rations for workers and soldiers, even at the expense of depleting scarce food reserves. Such measures convinced the workers of Petrograd to return to work at the start of March.

Bolshevik authoritarianism and the continued lack of freedom and reforms led to increased discontent among their own followers and reinforced the opposition. In their eagerness to secure their power, the Bolsheviks caused the growth of their own opposition. The centralism and bureaucracy of "war communism" added to the existing logistical difficulties. With the end of the civil war, opposition groups emerged within the Bolshevik party itself. One of the more left-wing, syndicalism-aligned opposition groups, the Workers' Opposition, aimed to take control of the party leadership. Another wing of the party, the Group of Democratic Centralism, advocated for the decentralization of power to the soviets.

=== Fleet composition ===
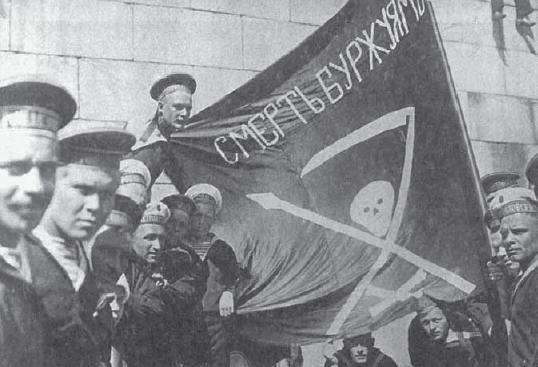
The crew of the Petropavlovsk during the March 1917 Baltic Fleet riot of March 1917

Since 1917, anarchist sympathies held a strong influence on Kronstadt. The inhabitants of the island favored the local soviet autonomy won in the revolution, and considered central government interference undesirable and unnecessary. Displaying a radical support for the Soviets, Kronstadt had taken part in important revolutionary period events such as the July Days, October Revolution, the assassination of the Provisional Government ministers, the Constituent Assembly dissolution, and the civil war. More than forty thousand sailors from the Soviet Baltic Fleet participated in the fighting against the White Army between 1918 and 1920. Despite participating in major conflicts alongside the Bolsheviks and being among the most active troops in government service, sailors from the outset were wary of the possibility of centralization of power and bureaucratization.

The composition of the naval base, however, had changed during the civil war. While many of its former sailors had been sent to various other parts of the country during the conflict and had been replaced by Ukrainian peasants less favorable to the Bolshevik government, most of the sailors present in Kronstadt during the revolt—about three quarters—were veterans of 1917. At the beginning of 1921, the island had a population of about 50,000 civilians and 26,000 sailors and soldiers. It had been the main base of the Baltic Fleet since the evacuation of Tallinn and Helsinki after the signing of the Treaty of Brest-Litovsk. Until the revolt, the naval base still considered itself in favor of the Bolsheviks and several party affiliates. However, Rogovin found that only 1,650 members of the 26,687 Kronstadt sailors were members and candidate members of the Bolshevik party at the beginning of 1921.

The Baltic Fleet had been shrinking since the summer of 1917, when it had eight battleships, nine cruisers, more than fifty destroyers, about forty submarines, and hundreds of auxiliary vessels. In 1920, only two battleships, sixteen destroyers, six submarines, and a minesweeper fleet remained from the original fleet. Now unable to heat their ships, the sailors were further angered by the fuel shortage, and there were fears that even more ships would be lost owing to flaws that made them especially vulnerable in winter. Island supply was also poor, partly due to the highly centralized control system. Many units had not yet received their new uniforms in 1919. Rations decreased in quantity and quality, and towards the end of 1920 the fleet suffered an outbreak of scurvy. Protests demanding improvements in soldier food rations went ignored and agitators were arrested.

The organization of the fleet had changed dramatically since 1917. The Tsentrobalt central committee took control after the October Revolution and progressively centralized its organization. This process accelerated in January 1919 with Trotsky's visit to Kronstadt following a disastrous naval attack on Tallinn. A government-appointed Revolutionary Military Committee now controlled the fleet and the naval committees were abolished. Attempts to form a new body of Bolshevik naval officers to replace the few tsarists still running the fleet failed. Fyodor Raskolnikov's appointment as commander in chief in June 1920, aimed at increasing the fleet's ability to act and ending tensions, resulted in failure and the sailors met it with hostility. Attempts at reform and increasing discipline led to a change in fleet personnel and produced great dissatisfaction among local party members. Attempts to centralize control displeased most local communists. Raskolnikov also clashed with Zinoviev, as both wished to control political activity in the fleet. Zinoviev attempted to present himself as a defender of the old Soviet democracy and accused Trotsky and his commissioners of being responsible for introducing centralized overreach into the organization of the fleet. Raskolnikov tried to get rid of the strong opposition by expelling a quarter of the fleet's members at the end of October 1920, but failed.

=== Growing discontent and opposition ===
By January 1921, Raskolnikov had lost real control of fleet management because of his disputes with Zinoviev and held his position only formally. The sailors revolted in Kronstadt, officially deposing Raskolnikov from office. On 15 February 1921, an opposition group within the Bolshevik party itself passed a critical resolution at a party conference with Bolshevik delegates from the Baltic Fleet. This resolution harshly criticized the fleet's administrative policy, accusing it of removing power from the masses and most active officials, and becoming a purely bureaucratic body. It demanded the democratization of party structures and warned that if there were no changes there could be a rebellion.

Troop morale was low, with sailors discouraged by inactivity, supply and ammunition shortages, the administrative crisis, and the impossibility of leaving the service. The temporary increase in sailors' licenses following the end of fighting with anti-Soviet forces also undermined the mood of the fleet: protests in cities and the crisis in the countryside over government seizures and a ban on trade personally affected the sailors who temporarily returned to their homes. The sailors had discovered the country's grave situation after months or years of fighting for the government, which triggered a strong sense of disillusionment. The number of desertions increased abruptly during the winter of 1920–1921.

== Petropavlovsk resolution ==
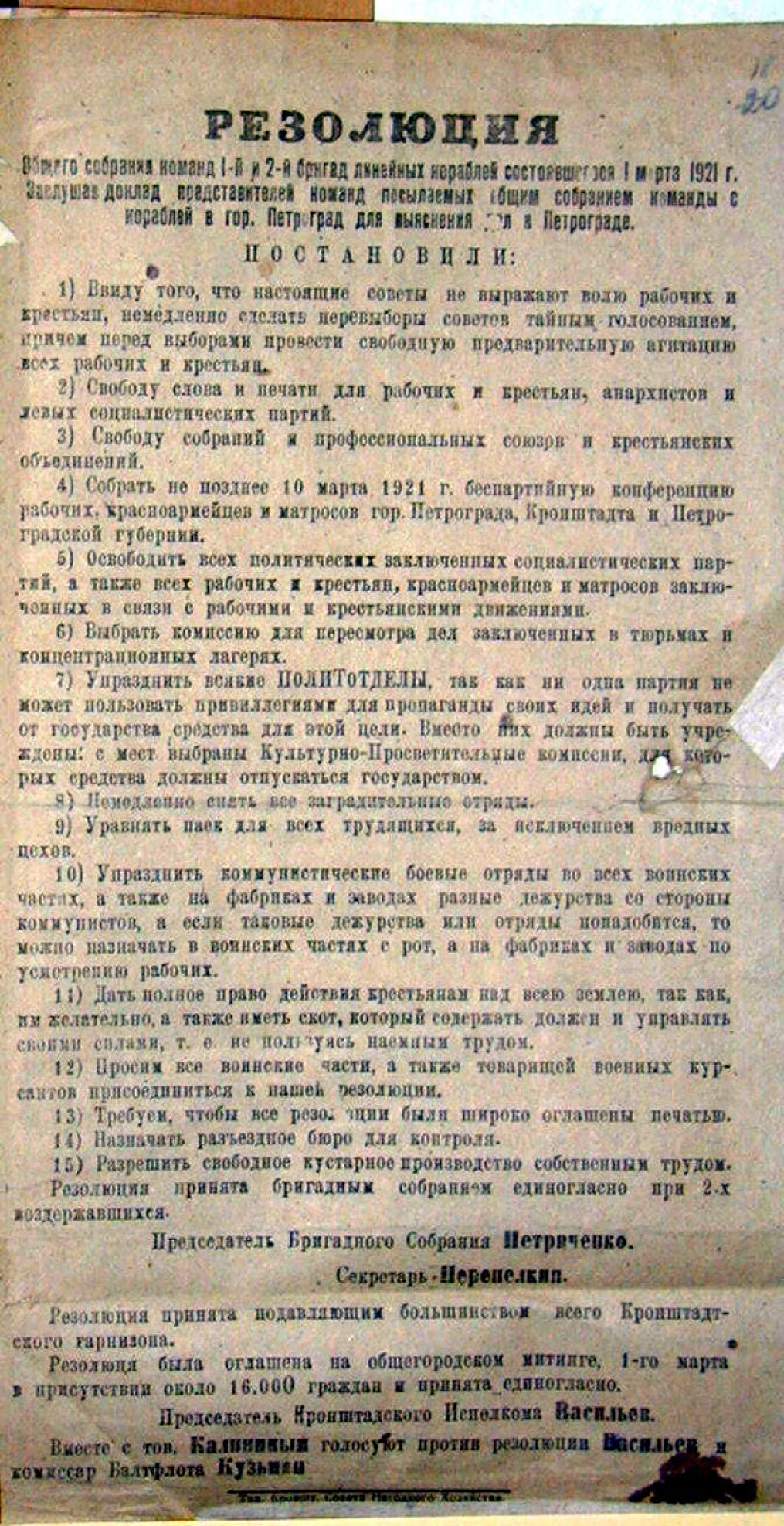
The resolution taken by the Kronstadt seamen, containing demands such as the election of free soviets and freedom of speech and press

News of the protests in Petrograd, coupled with disquieting rumors of a harsh crackdown on these demonstrations, increased tensions among fleet members. In late February, in response to the events in Petrograd, the crews of the ships Petropavlovsk and Sevastopol held an emergency meeting and sent a delegation to the city to investigate and inform Kronstadt about the protests. Upon returning two days later, the delegation informed the crews about the strikes and protests in Petrograd and the government repression. The sailors decided to support the protesters of the capital by passing a resolution with fifteen demands that would be sent to the government:

# In view of the fact that the present Soviets do not express the will of the workers and peasants, immediately to hold new elections by secret ballot, the pre-election campaign to have full freedom of agitation among the workers and peasants;

1. To establish freedom of speech and press for workers and peasants, for Anarchists and left Socialist parties;
2. To secure freedom of assembly for labor unions and peasant organizations;
3. To call a nonpartisan Conference of the workers, Red Army soldiers and sailors of Petrograd, Kronstadt, and of Petrograd Province, no later than 10 March 1921;
4. To liberate all political prisoners of Socialist parties, as well as all workers, peasants, soldiers, and sailors imprisoned in connection with the labor and peasant movements;
5. To elect a Commission to review the cases of those held in prisons and concentration camps;
6. To abolish all politotdeli (political bureaus) because no party should be given special privileges in the propagation of its ideas or receive the financial support of the Government for such purposes. Instead there should be established educational and cultural commissions, locally elected and financed by the Government;
7. To abolish immediately all zagryaditelniye otryadi (Bolshevik units armed to suppress traffic and confiscate foodstuffs);
8. To equalize the rations of all who work, with the exception of those employed in trades detrimental to health;
9. To abolish the Bolshevik fighting detachments in all branches of the Army, as well as the Bolshevik guards kept on duty in mills and factories. Should such guards or military detachments be found necessary, they are to be appointed in the Army from the ranks, and in the factories according to the judgment of the workers;
10. To give the peasants full freedom of action in regard to their land, and also the right to keep cattle, on condition that the peasants manage with their own means; that is, without employing hired labor;
11. To request all branches of the Army, as well as our comrades the military kursanti, to concur in our resolutions;
12. To demand that the press give the fullest publicity to our resolutions;
13. To appoint a Traveling Commission of Control;
14. To permit free kustarnoye (individual small scale) production by one's own efforts.

Among the main rebel demands were new, free elections (as stipulated by the constitution) for the Soviets, the right to freedom of expression, and total freedom of action and trade. According to the resolution's proponents, the elections would result in the defeat of the Bolsheviks and the "triumph of the October Revolution". The Bolsheviks, who had once planned a much more ambitious economic program beyond the sailors' demands, could not tolerate the affront that these political demands represented to their power—they questioned the legitimacy of the Bolsheviks as representatives of the working classes. The old demands that Lenin had defended in 1917 were now considered counterrevolutionary and dangerous to the Soviet government controlled by the Bolsheviks.

The following day, 1 March, about fifteen thousand people attended a large assembly convened by the local soviet in Anchor Square. The authorities tried to appease the spirit of the crowd by sending Mikhail Kalinin, chairman of the All-Russian Central Executive Committee as a speaker, while Zinoviev did not dare to go to the island. However, the attitude of the present crowd, which demanded free elections for the soviets, freedom of speech and the press for leftist anarchists and socialists, and all workers and peasants, freedom of assembly, suppression of political sections in the army, was soon apparent. Equal rations save for those who did the heavier work—rather than the Bolsheviks who enjoyed the best rations—economic freedom and freedom of organization for the workers and peasants, and political amnesty. Those present overwhelmingly endorsed the resolution previously adopted by the Kronstadt seamen. Most of the communists present in the crowd also supported the resolution. The protests of the Bolshevik leaders were rejected, but Kalinin was able to return safely to Petrograd.

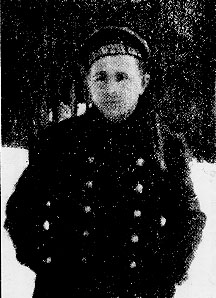
Stepan Petrichenko, anarchist sailor who chaired the Provisional Revolutionary Committee during the Kronstadt revolt

Although the rebels did not expect a military confrontation with the government, tensions in Kronstadt grew after the arrest and disappearance of a delegation sent by the naval base to Petrograd to investigate the situation of strikes and protests in the city. Some of the base's communists began to arm themselves while others abandoned it.

On 2 March, the delegates of warships, military units, and unions met to prepare for reelection of the local soviet. About 300 delegates joined in to renew the soviet as decided at the previous day's assembly. The leading Bolshevik representatives tried to dissuade the delegates through threats, but were unsuccessful. Three of them, the president of the local soviet and the commissars of the Kuzmin fleet and the Kronstadt platoon, were arrested by the rebels. The break with the government came about as a rumor spread through the assembly that the government planned to crack down on the assembly and send government troops to the naval base. Immediately a Provisional Revolutionary Committee (PRC) was elected, formed by the five members of the collegiate presidency of the assembly, to manage the island until the election of a new local soviet. The committee enlarged to 15 members two days later. The assembly of delegates became the island's parliament, and met twice on 4 and 11 March.

Part of the Kronstadt Bolsheviks hastily left the island. A group of them, led by the fortress commissioner, tried to crush the revolt but, lacking support, eventually ran away. During the early hours of 2 March, the town, fleet boats and island fortifications were already in the hands of the PRC, which met with no resistance. The rebels arrested 326 Bolsheviks, about a fifth of the local communists, the rest of whom were left free. In contrast, the Bolshevik authorities executed forty-five sailors in Oranienbaum and took relatives of the rebels hostage. None of the rebel-held Bolsheviks suffered abuse, torture or executions. The prisoners received the same rations as the rest of the islanders and lost only their boots and shelters, which were handed over to the soldiers on duty at the fortifications.

The government accused opponents of being French-led counterrevolutionaries and claimed that the Kronstadt rebels were commanded by General Alexander Kozlovsky, the former Tsarist officer then responsible for base artillery, although it was in the hands of the Revolutionary Committee. As of 2 March, the entire province of Petrograd was subject to martial law and the Defense Committee chaired by Zinoviev had obtained special powers to suppress the protests. There was a hurry to gain control of the fortress before the thawing of the frozen bay, which would have made it impregnable for the land army. Trotsky presented alleged French press articles announcing the revolt two weeks before its outbreak as proof that the rebellion was a plan devised by the emigre and the forces of the Entente. Lenin used the same tactic to accuse the rebels a few days later at the 10th Party Congress.

Despite the intransigence of the government and the willingness of the authorities to crush the revolt by force, many communists supported the sailors' demanded reforms and preferred a negotiated resolution to end the conflict. In reality, the initial attitude of the Petrograd government was not as uncompromising as it seemed; Kalinin himself assumed that the demands were acceptable and should undergo only a few changes, while the local Petrograd Soviet tried to appeal to the sailors by saying that they had been misled by certain counterrevolutionary agents. Moscow's attitude, however, from the outset was far harsher than that of the Petrograd leaders.

Critics of the government, including some communists, accused it of betraying the ideals of the 1917 revolution and implementing a violent, corrupt and bureaucratic regime. In part, the various opposition groups within the party itself—the Left Communists, Democratic Centralists and the Workers Opposition—agreed with such criticisms, even though their leaders did not support the revolt, but members of the latter two groups would still help to suppress the revolt.

== Reaction in Petrograd ==
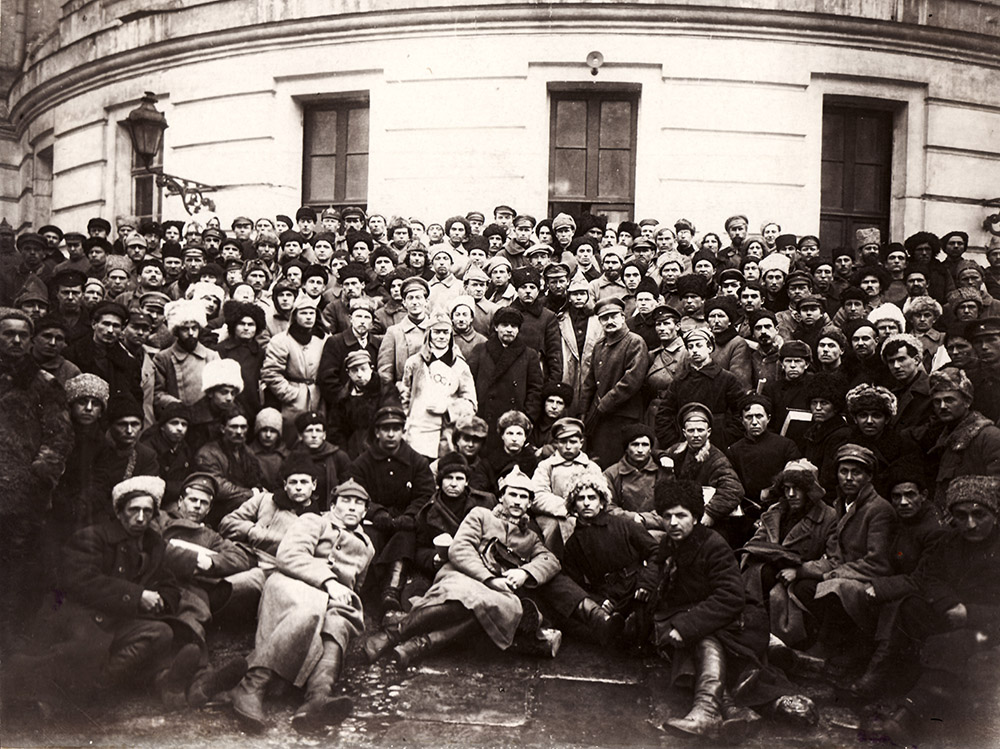
The Bolshevik Party's 10th Congress (delegates pictured) overlapped with the Kronstadt rebellion

The authorities portrayed the rebels as counter-revolutionaries and falsely accused them of doing the Whites' and other enemies' bidding. The rebels did not expect attacks from the authorities nor did they launch attacks against the continent—rejecting Kozlovsky's advice—nor did the island's communists denounce any kind of collusion by the rebels in the early moments of the revolt. They even attended the delegate assembly on 2 March. Initially, the rebels sought to show a conciliatory stance with the government, believing that it could comply with Kronstadt's demands. Kalinin, who spoke at the assembly, would have been a valuable hostage for the rebels yet returned to Petrograd without issue.

Neither the rebels nor the government expected the Kronstadt protests to trigger a rebellion. Many of the local members of the Bolshevik party did not see in the rebels and their demands the supposedly counterrevolutionary character denounced by the Moscow leaders. Local communists even published a manifesto in the island's new journal.

Some of the government troops sent to suppress the revolt, upon learning that the island's rule by commissioners had been eliminated, instead defected to the rebellion. The government had serious problems with the regular troops sent to suppress the uprising, and resorted to using cadets and Cheka agents. The high-ranking Bolshevik leaders responsible for the operation had to return from the 10th Party Congress in Moscow.

The rebels' claim of a "third revolution" to uphold ideals of 1917 and limit the Bolshevik government's power risked undermining and dividing popular support for the Bolshevik party. To maintain credulity, the Bolsheviks made the revolt appear counterrevolutionary, explaining their uncompromising military campaign and stance. The Bolsheviks tried to present themselves as the sole legitimate defenders of working class interests.

=== Opposition activities ===
The various groups of emigres and government opponents were too divided to make a joint-effort for the rebels. Kadetes, Mensheviks, and revolutionary socialists maintained their differences and did not collaborate to support the rebellion. Victor Chernov and the revolutionary socialists attempted to launch a fundraising campaign to help the sailors, but the PRC refused aid, convinced that the revolt would spread throughout the country, with no need for foreign aid. The Mensheviks, for their part, were sympathetic to the rebel demands but not to the revolt itself. The Paris-based Russian Union of Industry and Commerce secured support from the French Foreign Ministry to supply the island and begin fundraising for the rebels. Wrangel, whom the French continued to supply, promised his Constantinople troops to Kozlovsky and began an unsuccessful campaign to gain the support of the powers. No power agreed to provide military support to the rebels, and only France tried to facilitate the arrival of food on the island. Aid from the Finnish "kadetes" did not arrive in time. Even as anti-Bolsheviks called on the Russian Red Cross's assistance, no help came to the island during the two-week rebellion.

The National Center separately plotted a Kronstadt uprising in which the "kadetes", with Wrangel's troops, would turn the city into a new center of anti-Bolshevik resistance, but the rebellion occurred independent of this plan. The Kronstadt rebels had little contact with the emigrants during the revolt, although rebel leaders including Petrichenko joined Wrangel's forces after the insurrection failed.

=== Rebel activities ===
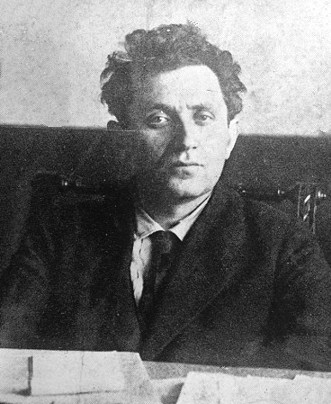
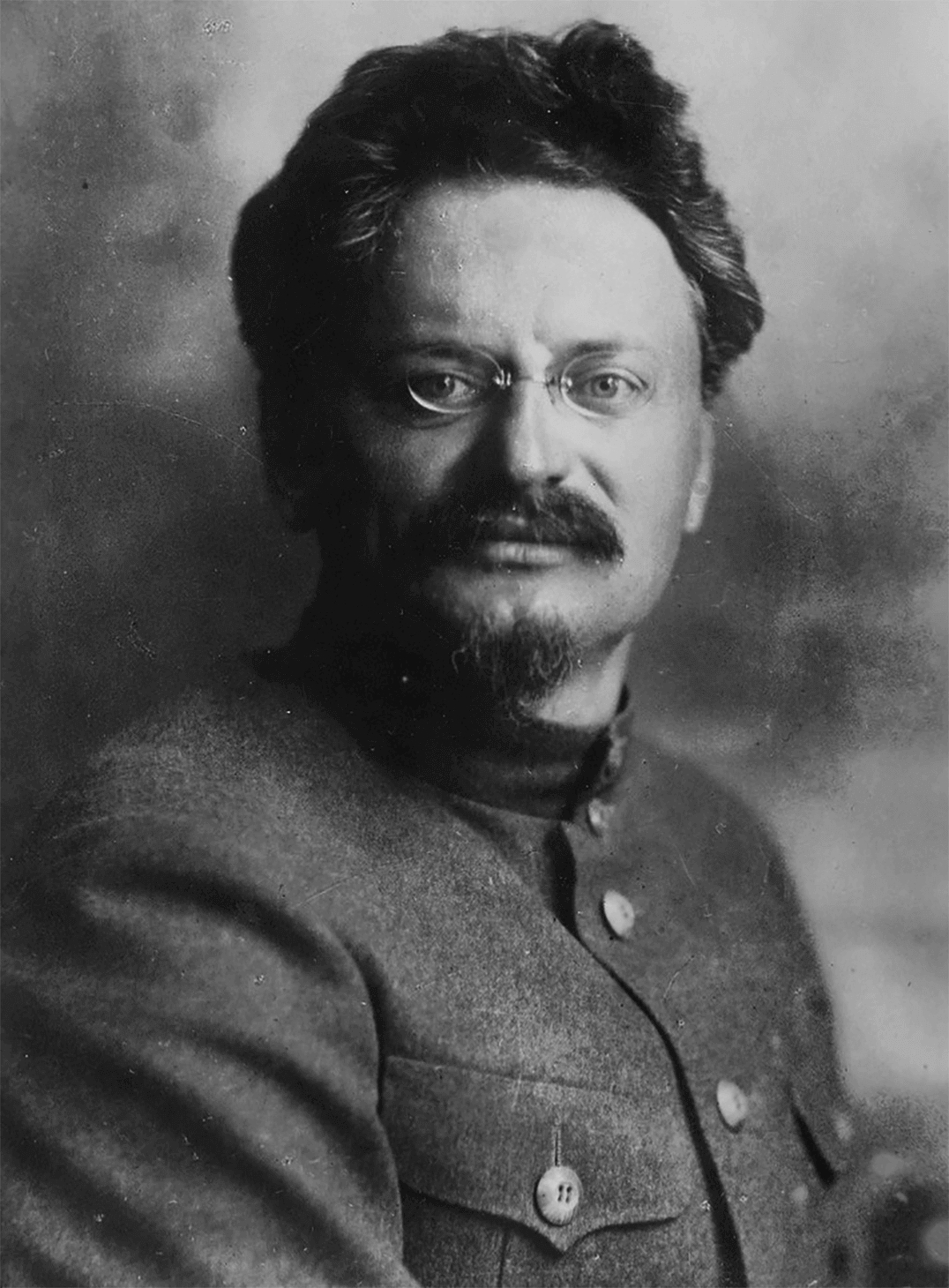
Zinoviev, chair of the Petrograd council, and Trotsky, chair of the Revolutionary War Council, became enemies of Kronstadt after dropping an accusative leaflet over the city

The rebels justified the uprising as an attack on Bolshevik "commissiocracy". According to them, the Bolsheviks had betrayed the principles of the October Revolution, making the Soviet government a bureaucratic autocracy sustained by Cheka terror. According to the rebels, a "third revolution" should restore power to the freely elected Soviet councils, eliminate union bureaucracy, and begin the implantation of a new socialism that would serve as an example for the whole world. The citizens of Kronstadt, however, did not want the holding of a new constituent assembly or the return of representative democracy, but the return of power to the free workers councils. Fearful of justifying the Bolshevik's accusations, the rebellion leaders took care to refrain from attacking revolutionary symbols and reject assistance that might relate them in any way to the emigrants or counterrevolutionary forces. The rebels demanded reform rather than the demise of the Bolshevik party to eliminate its strong authoritarian and bureaucratic tendency that had grown during the civil war, an opinion held by oppositional currents within the party itself. The rebels maintained that the party had sacrificed its democratic, egalitarian ideals to remain in power. The Kronstadt seamen remained faithful to the ideals of 1917, defending workers' council independence from political party control, free and unrestricted participation for all leftist tendencies, guaranteed worker civil rights, and direct elections by workers in place of government/party appointments.

Several leftist tendencies participated in the revolt. The anarchist rebels demanded, in addition to individual freedoms, the self-determination of workers. The Bolsheviks feared that mass spontaneous social movement could fall into the hands of reaction. For Lenin, Kronstadt's demands displayed a "semi-anarchist" and "petty-bourgeois" character but, as the concerns of the peasantry and workers reflected, they posed a far greater threat to their government than the White armies. Bolshevik leaders thought that rebel ideals resembled the Russian populism. The Bolsheviks had long criticized the populists, who in their opinion were reactionary and unrealistic in rejecting the idea of a centralized, industrialized state. Such an idea, as popular as it was, according to Lenin, should lead to the disintegration of the country into thousands of separate communes, ending centralized Bolshevik power but, over time, could result in a new, centralist, right-wing regime and thus needed to be suppressed.

Influenced by various socialist and anarchist groups, but free from their control and initiatives, the rebels made several demands from all these groups in a vague and unclear program that represented much more a popular protest against misery and oppression than it did a coherent government program. With speeches emphasizing land collectivization, freedom, popular will and participation, and the defense of a decentralized state, the rebels' ideas were comparable with anarchism. Besides the anarchists, the Maximalists were the closest political group to support these positions. Their program was similar to the revolutionary slogans of 1917, which remained popular during the time of the uprising: "all land for the peasants", "all factories for the workers", "all bread and all products for the workers", and "all power to the soviets but not the parties". Disillusioned with the political parties, unions in the uprising advocated for free unions to give economic power back to workers. The sailors, like the revolutionary socialists, defended peasantry interests and showed little interest in matters of large industry, though they rejected the idea of holding a new constituent assembly, one of the pillars of the revolutionary socialist program. A number of the seamen had strongly antisemitic views, with some advocating for the expulsion of Jews to Palestine, although these did not have majority appeal among the rebels.

The rebels implemented a series of administrative changes during the uprising. Changes to the rationing system led to all citizens receiving equal rations, save for children and the sick, who received special rations. Schools closed and a curfew was set. Departments and commissariats were abolished, replaced by union delegates' boards, and revolutionary troikas were formed to implement the PRC measures in all factories, institutions, and military units.

On the afternoon of 2 March, Kronstadt delegates crossed the frozen sea to Oranienbaum to disseminate the Petropavlovsk resolution. There they received unanimous support from the 1st Naval Air Squadron. That night, the Kronstadt PRC sent a 250-man detachment to Oranienbaum but was driven back by machine gun fire. Three delegates that the Oranienbaum air squadron had sent to Kronstadt were arrested by Cheka as they returned to the city. The commissioner of Oranienbaum, aware of the facts and fearing the upheaval of his other units, requested Zinoviev's urgent help, armed the local party members, and increased their rations to secure their loyalty. During the early morning hours, an armored cadet and three light artillery batteries arrived in Petrograd, surrounded the barracks of the rebel unit, and arrested the insurgents. After extensive interrogation, 45 of them were shot.

Despite this setback, the rebels continued their passive stance and rejected the advice of the "military experts"—a euphemism used to designate the tsarist officers employed by the Soviets under the surveillance of the commissars—to attack various points of the continent rather than staying on the island. The ice around the base was not broken, the warships were not released and the defenses of Petrograd's entrances were not strengthened. Kozlovsky complained about the hostility of the sailors towards the officers, judging the timing of the insurrection as untimely. The rebels were convinced that the Bolshevik authorities would yield and negotiate the stated demands.

In the few mainland places supporting the rebels, the Bolsheviks promptly suppressed revolt. In Moscow, a delegation from the naval base was arrested trying to convince an icebreaker's crew to join the rebellion. Most island delegates sent to the continent were arrested. Unable to spread the revolt and rejecting Soviet authorities' demands to end the rebellion, the rebels adopted a defensive strategy of administrative reforms on the island and waiting for the spring thaw, which would increase their natural defenses against being detained.

On 4 March, as delegates returned from the mainland reporting that the Bolsheviks had suppressed the real character of the revolt and instead were spreading news of a White uprising in the naval base, the assembly approved the extension of the PRC and the delivery of weapons to citizens to maintain security in the city and free up soldiers and sailors for the defense of the island.

At a tumultuous meeting of the Petrograd Soviet, despite resistance from rebel representatives, an approved resolution called for the end of the rebellion and the return of power to the local Kronstadt Soviet. Arriving late from Siberia via Moscow, Trotsky immediately issued an ultimatum demanding unconditional and immediate rebel surrender. Zinoviev's Petrograd Defense Committee airdropped a leaflet over Kronstadt accusing the rebellion of being orchestrated by the White Army, ordering their surrender, and threatening that those who resisted would be "shot like partridges". Petrograd also ordered the arrest of the rebels' relatives as hostages, a strategy formerly used by Trotsky during the civil war to secure the loyalty of the Red Army's ex-tsarist officers and demanded the release of Bolshevik officers detained in Kronstadt. Thus, to the rebel sailors, Trotsky and Zinoviev embodied the Bolshevik malevolence they were protesting. The rebels responded that their prisoners had full liberties and would not be released while Petrograd held families hostage. The hostage tactic also contributed to the failure of the sole attempt at mediation, as Kronstadt and Petrograd disagreed over the composition of a commission that could be sent to observe and mediate Kronstadt's conditions.

On 7 March, the extended deadline expired for accepting Trotsky ultimatum. During the wait, the government bolstered its forces and prepared an attack plan with Red Army commanders, cadets, and Cheka units. Mikhail Tukhachevsky, then a prominent young officer, took command of the 7th Army and the rest of the Petrograd troops. The 7th Army, composed mainly of peasants, was demotivated from having already defended the former capital throughout the civil war, sympathetic for the rebel demands, and reluctant to fight their comrades. Tukhachevsky had to rely on the cadets, Cheka and Bolshevik units to head the attack on the rebel island.

Kronstadt, meanwhile, reinforced its defenses with 2,000 civilian recruits atop the 13,000-man garrison. The city itself had a thick wall and across the island's forts and ships were 135 cannons and 68 machine guns. The 15 forts had turrets and thick armor. Artillery on Kronstadt's main warships, Petropavlovsk and Sevastopol, outclassed that of the most powerful mainland fort but was frozen in disadvantageous position. The base also had eight docked warships, amid other gunboats and tugboats, all rendered inaccessible by ice. Kronstadt had excellent defenses between this weaponry and the protection of vast distances of open ice. With the nearest forts far away, this frightening trek across the ice, unprotected from the island's firepower greatly unnerved the Bolshevik troops.

The Kronstadt rebels also had their difficulties, lacking the ammunition, winter clothing, food reserves, and fuel to fend off a prolonged siege.

== Attack on Kronstadt ==
St. Petersburg
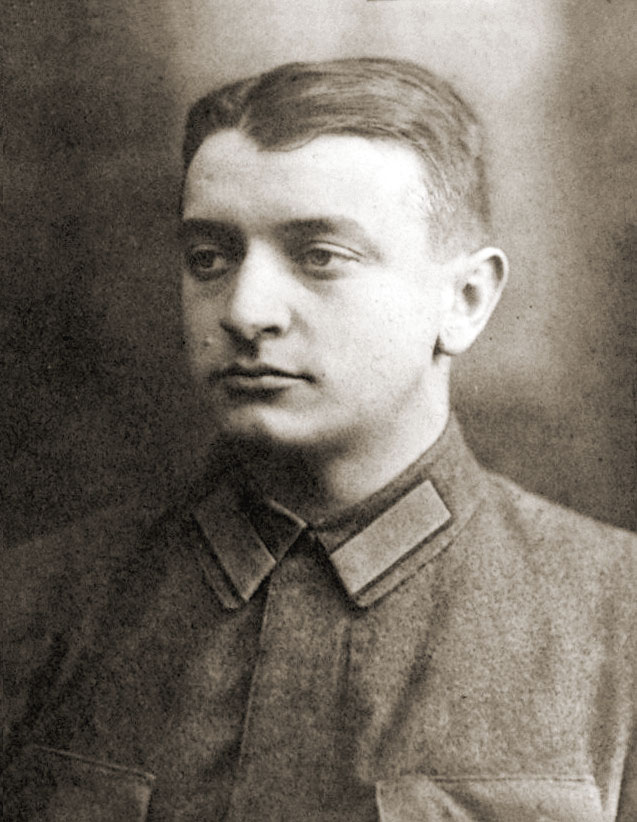
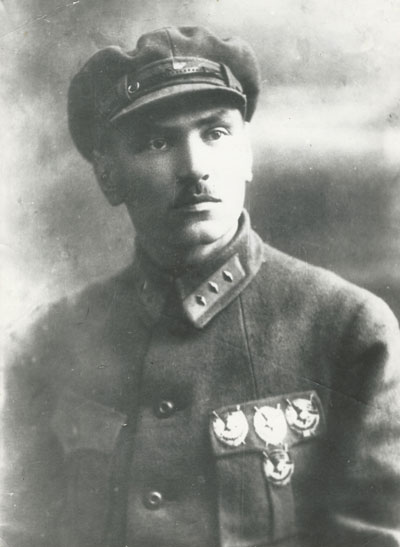
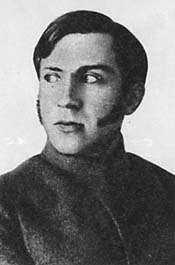
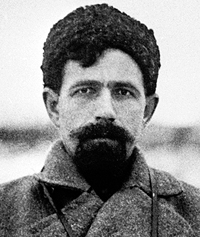
Red Army commander and prominent officers of the final attack, clockwise from top left: Tukhachevsky, Fedko, Dybenko, Putna

Bolshevik military operations against the island began the morning of 7 March. Some 60,000 troops took part in the attack. Artillery strikes from Sestroretsk and Lisy Nos to the north sought to weaken the island's defenses and enable an infantry attack, which followed the next day before dawn. Amid a blinding snowstorm, Tukhachevsky's units attacked from the north and south with cadets at the forefront, followed by select Red Army units and Cheka machine gunners, who had orders to shoot defectors. Scores of Red Army soldiers drowned as the ice beneath them was blown out by explosions. Others defected or refused to advance. The few troops who reached the island were forced to withdraw. Artillery attacks resumed when the storm subsided. In the afternoon, Bolshevik aircraft began bombarding the island, but to little effect. The Bolsheviks made premature, triumphalist statements of their imminent victory, but their forces had suffered hundreds of casualties and defections due to insufficient preparation, low morale, and the danger of their unprotected approach by ice.

A series of minor skirmishes against Kronstadt took place in the days following the failed opening salvo. While the Bolsheviks prepared additional troops with less emotional investment (cadet regiments, Communist Youth, Cheka forces, and non-Russians), Zinoviev made concessions to the people of Petrograd to keep the peace. Trotsky's closed session report to the 10th Party Congress led over a quarter of congressional delegates to volunteer, mainly to boost soldier morale, which was difficult in light of the Bolshevik strategy of sending minor, futile attempts at overtaking the island. On 10 March, planes bombed Kronstadt, and coastal batteries fired at the island at night in preparation for a southeast attack on the island the next morning, which failed and resulted in a large number of government casualties. Fog prevented operations for the rest of the day. Bolshevik officers, refusing to wait for reinforcement and mindful that their ice bridge would soon melt, continued to bomb the coast on 12 March, causing little damage. Small troop assaults the next two days were driven back with scores of casualties. After 14 March, air and artillery attacks continued but the troops waited for a larger push. Several small precursors of mutiny and work stoppage outside Kronstadt were contained during this time.

In the period awaiting a unified attack, the mood shifted. News from Moscow's 10th Congress announced the end of War Communism. In particular, Bolshevik peasant soldiers were pleased by the cornerstone policy change, from forced requisition of all peasant surplus produce to a tax in kind, which freed the peasant post-tax to use or sell as they wished. In the same period, by mid-March, the rebels' high spirits grew dim with the realization that their cause had not spread and, with supplies dwindling, that no help was forthcoming. Kronstadt's sailors felt this feeling of betrayal long after the city fell.

=== Final attack ===
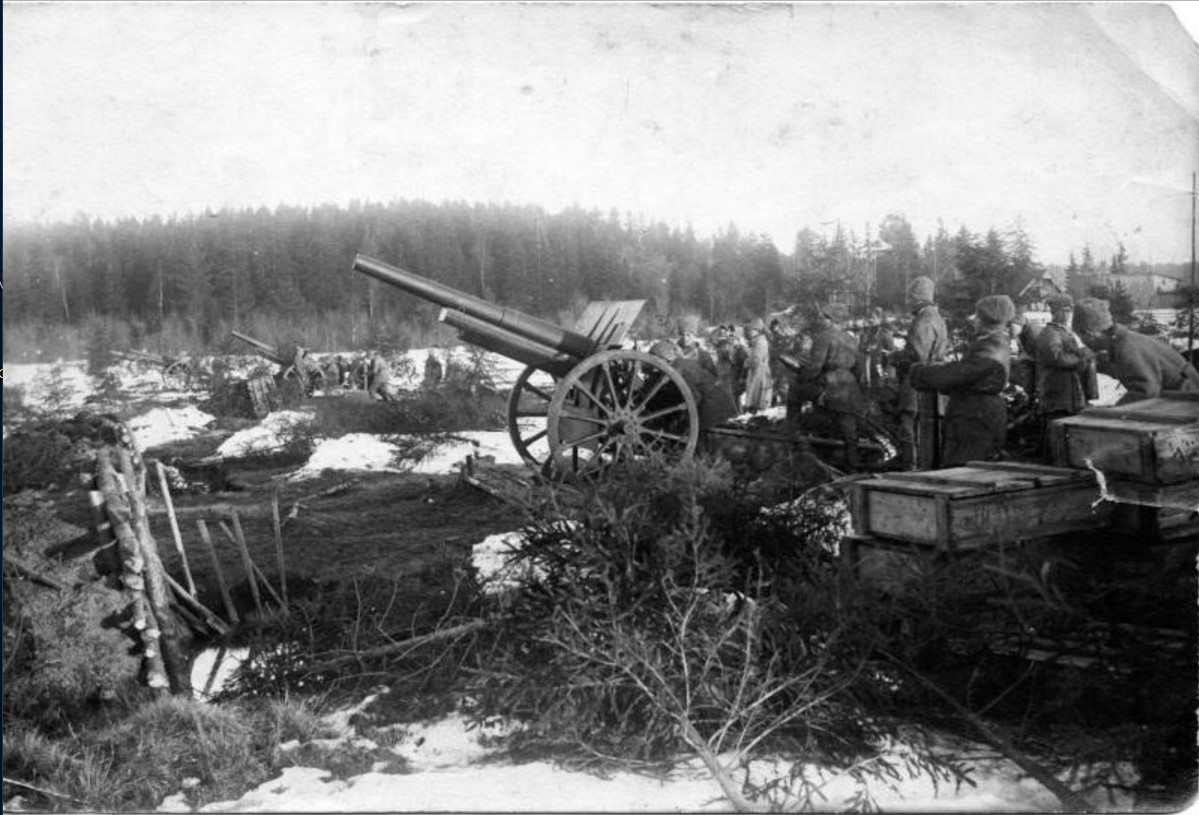
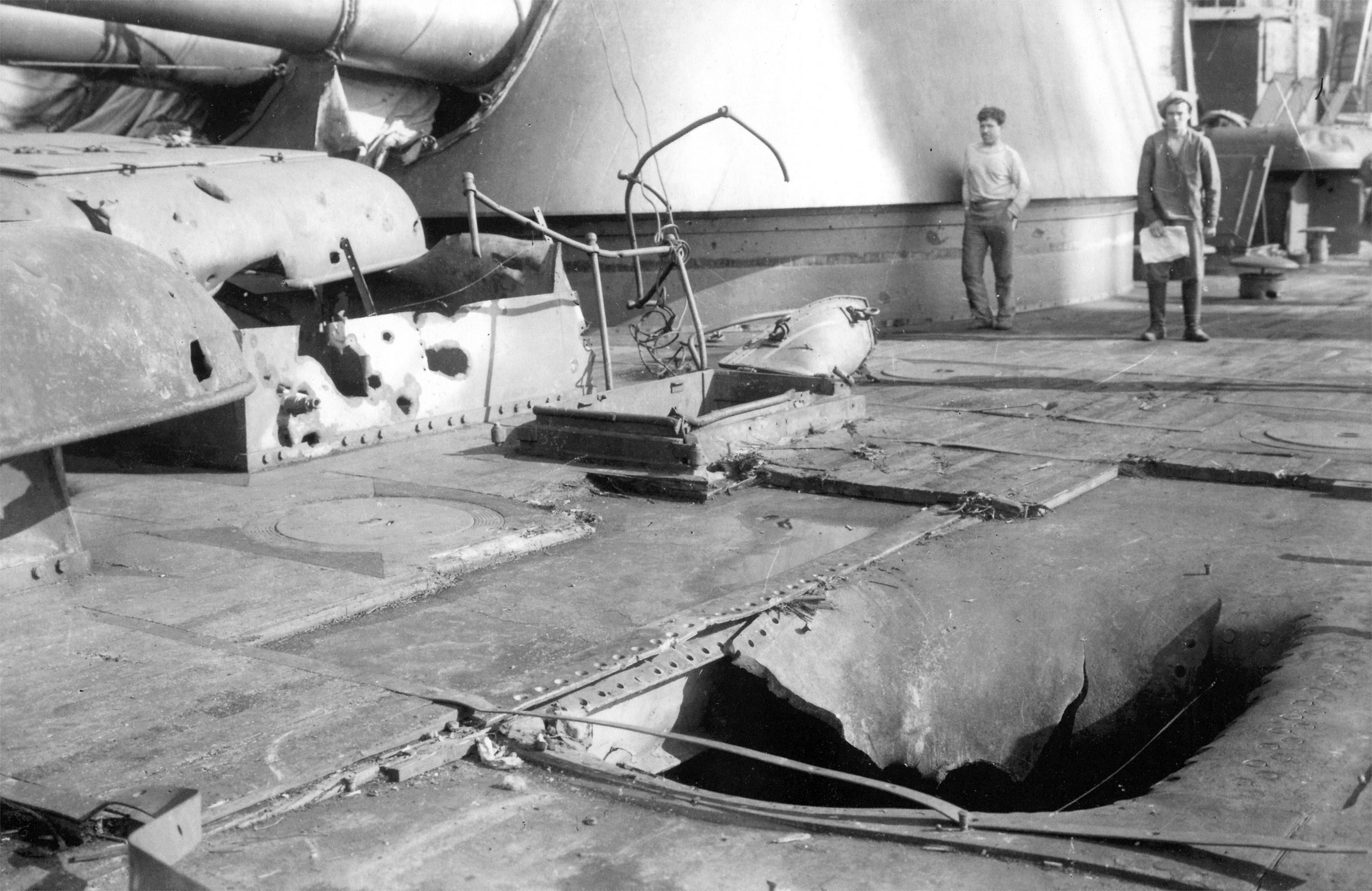
Bolshevik artillery on the shore of Gulf of Finland and damage to the Petropavlovsk during the assault

On 16 March, as Kronstadt accepted a proposal for Russian Red Cross emergency food and medicine, Tukhachevsky's reinforced army of 50,000 prepared to take the island and its 15,000 rebels. Compared with prior attempts, the attackers enjoyed better numbers, morale, and leaders, including prominent Bolshevik officers Ivan Fedko, Pavel Dybenko, and Vitovt Putna. Tukhachevsky's plan consisted of a six-column approach from the north, (Note: Two columns from the north, four from the south) south, and east preceded by intense artillery bombing, which began in the early afternoon. Both the Sevastopol and Petropavlovsk suffered casualties from direct hits. The effects were more psychological, on rebel morale, than physical. The bombing ended by night and, like prior attacks, the rebels anticipated foot soldiers, who arrived before dawn. Most of the Bolshevik troops concentrated south of the island to attack from the south and east, while a smaller contingent of cadets gathered to the north.

Blanketed by darkness and fog, the northern soldiers silently advanced in two columns towards the island's forts. Despite their camouflage and caution, one column was discovered by spotlight cutting through barbed wire. The rebels unsuccessfully tried to persuade their attackers not to fight, but the Bolshevik cadets carried on, charging and retreating with many deaths until they captured the first two forts. Dawn of 17 March broke the fog and cover of night. Exposed, the two sides fought with heavy casualties, mainly by machine gun and grenades. By the afternoon, the Bolsheviks had taken several forts and the cadets had reached Kronstadt's northeast wall. The final northern forts fell by 1 a.m.

The larger southern group timed its assault to follow the northern group's lead by an hour. Three columns with machine guns and light artillery approached Kronstadt's harbour while a fourth column approached the island's vulnerable Petrograd Gate. Darkness and fog hid the shock troops from rebel searchlights, who were then able to overpower the rebels in the south of the city but were then met by the other forts' machine guns and artillery. Caught in the open, rebel reinforcements forced the Bolsheviks to retreat. More than half of the 79th Infantry Brigade had died, including delegates from the 10th Party Congress.

The column attacking Petrograd Gate from the east, however, was successful. One group breached the city walls north of the gate, followed by another group's march through the gate itself. Their losses had been great outside the city walls but inside they found a "veritable hell" with bullets seemingly from every window and roof. Fighting proceeded through the streets. Liberated Bolshevik prisoners joined the assault. Women supplied and nursed the defense. A late-afternoon rebel counterattack nearly drove the Bolsheviks from the city when a regiment of Petrograd volunteers arrived as Bolshevik backup. In the early evening, Oranienbaum artillery entered and ravaged the city. Later that evening, the northern cadets captured the Kronstadt headquarters, taking prisoners, and met the southern forces in the center of town. As forts fell, the battle was mostly over by midnight. The government held most structures by noon on 18 March and defeated the last resistance in the afternoon. The Bolsheviks had won.

Both sides suffered casualties on par with the civil war's deadliest battles. The American consulate at Vyborg estimated 10,000 Bolsheviks dead, wounded, or missing, including 15 Congress delegates. Finland asked Russia to remove the bodies on the ice, fearing a public health hazard after the thaw. There are no reliable reports for rebel deaths, but one report estimated 600 dead, 1,000 wounded, and 2,500 imprisoned, though more were killed in vengeance as the battle subsided. Tukhachevsky had discussed the possible use of gas shells and balloons from Petrograd to end the Kronstadt rebellion. Russia had shared a common interest in chemical weapons with other Great Powers since World War I. A military commission headed by Sergei Sheydeman decided to attack the Kronstadt forts through means of chemical shells and balloons. Trotsky and his commander-in-chief, Sergey Kamenev, had approved chemical warfare by gas shells and balloons against Kronstadt if the resistance continued. The plan had been drawn up by a group of students at the Higher Chemical High School. Trotsky would later create The Society of Chemical Defence and defend the use of smoke screen. The Military Revolutionary Council would also discuss the need for sleeping gas in the aftermath of the Kronstadt rebellion.

Faced with the prospect of summary executions, about 8,000 Kronstadt refugees (mostly soldiers) crossed into Finland within a day of Kronstadt's fall, about half of the rebel forces. Petrichenko and members of the Kronstadt Revolutionary Committee were among the first to flee, with 800 arriving before the end of the assault. The sailors' final acts were to sabotage Kronstadt's defenses, removing parts of weapons and equipment. The battleship crews, upon discovering their leaders' desertion, disobeyed their command to destroy the ships and instead arrested their officers and surrendered to the Bolsheviks.

== Aftermath ==
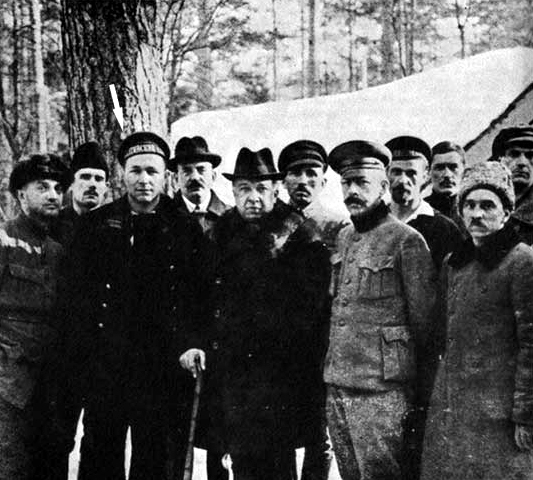
Petrichenko and other Kronstadt rebels in Finnish exile

Dybenko, a Bolshevik officer in the Kronstadt assault, was given full power to purge dissent as the Kronstadt Fort's new commander. In place of the Kronstadt Soviet, a troika of Kronstadt's former Bolshevik Party leaders assisted him. The battleships and city square were renamed and both unreliable sailors and the Bolshevik infantry alike were dispersed throughout the country.

There were no public trials. Of the 2,000 prisoners, 13 were tried in private as the rebellion's leaders and tried in the press as a counterrevolutionary conspiracy. None belonged to the Kronstadt Revolutionary Committee, of which four members were known to be in Bolshevik custody, or the "military specialists" who advised the rebel military. In practice, despite the government's continued insistence that White Army generals were behind the Kronstadt rebellion, former tsarist officers were far more prominent among the Bolsheviks than the rebels. White Colonel Georg Elfvengren would confirm in an April 1921 report that there had indeed been White agents based in Petrograd plotting a coup of the Soviet government in February and March 1921, but he also reported that the Kronstadt revolt was "not the actions of the [White] organizations" and that the revolt "occurred spontaneously against [the Whites'] wishes."

The 13 were sentenced to execution two days after the fall of Kronstadt. Hundreds of rebel prisoners were killed in Kronstadt and when Petrograd jails were full, hundreds more rebels were removed and shot. The rest moved to Cheka mainland prisons and forced labor camps, where many died of hunger or disease.

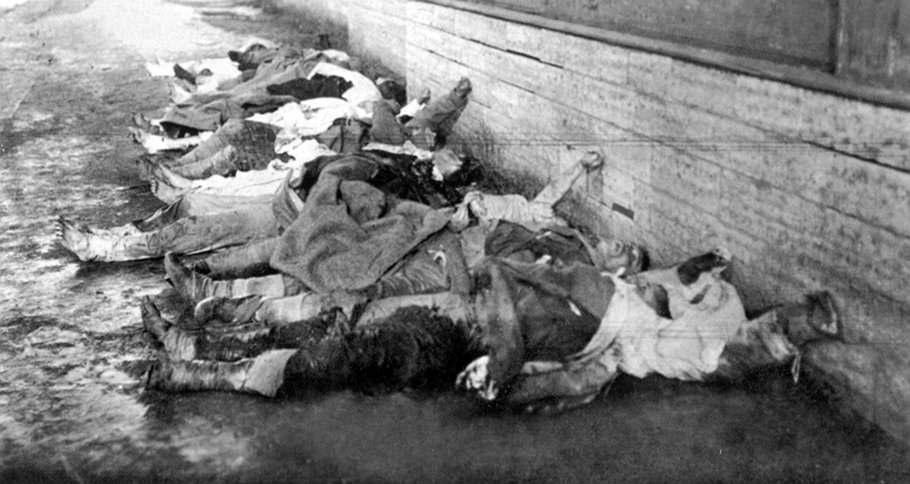
Captured Kronstadt sailors summarily executed.

Those who escaped to Finland were put in refugee camps, where life was bleak and isolating. The Red Cross provided food and clothing and some worked in public works. Finland wanted the refugees to settle in other countries while Bolsheviks sought their repatriation, promising amnesty. Instead, those who returned were arrested and sent to prison camps. Most of the émigrés had left Finland within several years. Petrichenko, chair of the Kronstadt Revolutionary Committee, remained respected among the Finnish refugees. He later joined pro-Soviet groups. During World War II, he was repatriated and died soon after in a prison camp.

None of the Kronstadt rebellion's demands were met. The Bolsheviks did not restore freedom of speech and assembly. They did not release socialist and anarchist political prisoners. Rival left-wing groups were suppressed rather than brought into coalition governance. The Bolsheviks did not adopt worker council autonomy ("free soviets") and did not entertain direct, democratic soldier election of military officials. Old directors and specialists continued to run the factories instead of the workers. State farms remained in place. Wage labor remained unchanged. Avrich described the aftermath as such: "As in all failed revolts in authoritarian regimes, the rebels realized the opposite of their aims: harsher dictatorship, less popular self-government."

Lenin announced two conclusions from Kronstadt: political rank closure within the party, and economic ingratiation for the peasantry. Lenin used Kronstadt to consolidate the Bolsheviks' power and dictatorial rule. Dissidents were expelled from the party. Oppositional leftist parties, once harassed but tolerated, were repressed—jailed or exiled—by the end of the year in the name of single party unity. The Bolsheviks tightened soldier discipline and scuttled plans for a peasant and worker army. Lenin wanted to scrap the Baltic Fleet as having an unreliable crew but, per Trotsky, they were instead reorganized and populated with loyal leadership.

During the 10th Party Congress, concurrent with the rebellion, Kronstadt symbolized the swelling peasant unrest towards the party's unpopular War Communism policy and the need for reform, but Kronstadt had no influence on Lenin's plans to replace War Communism with the New Economic Policy (NEP), which was drafted for the Congress's agenda in advance of even the rebel's demands. Rather the rebellion accelerated its adoption. Prior to the rebellion, Lenin recognized a trend of peasant dissatisfaction and feared general revolt during the country's transition, and so conceded that a conciliatory, peasant-focused domestic economic program was more immediately urgent than his ambitions for Western proletariat revolution. The New Economic Policy replaced forced food requisition with a tax in kind, letting peasants spend their surplus as they pleased. This defused peasant discontent with War Communism, freeing the Bolsheviks to consolidate power.

== Legacy ==
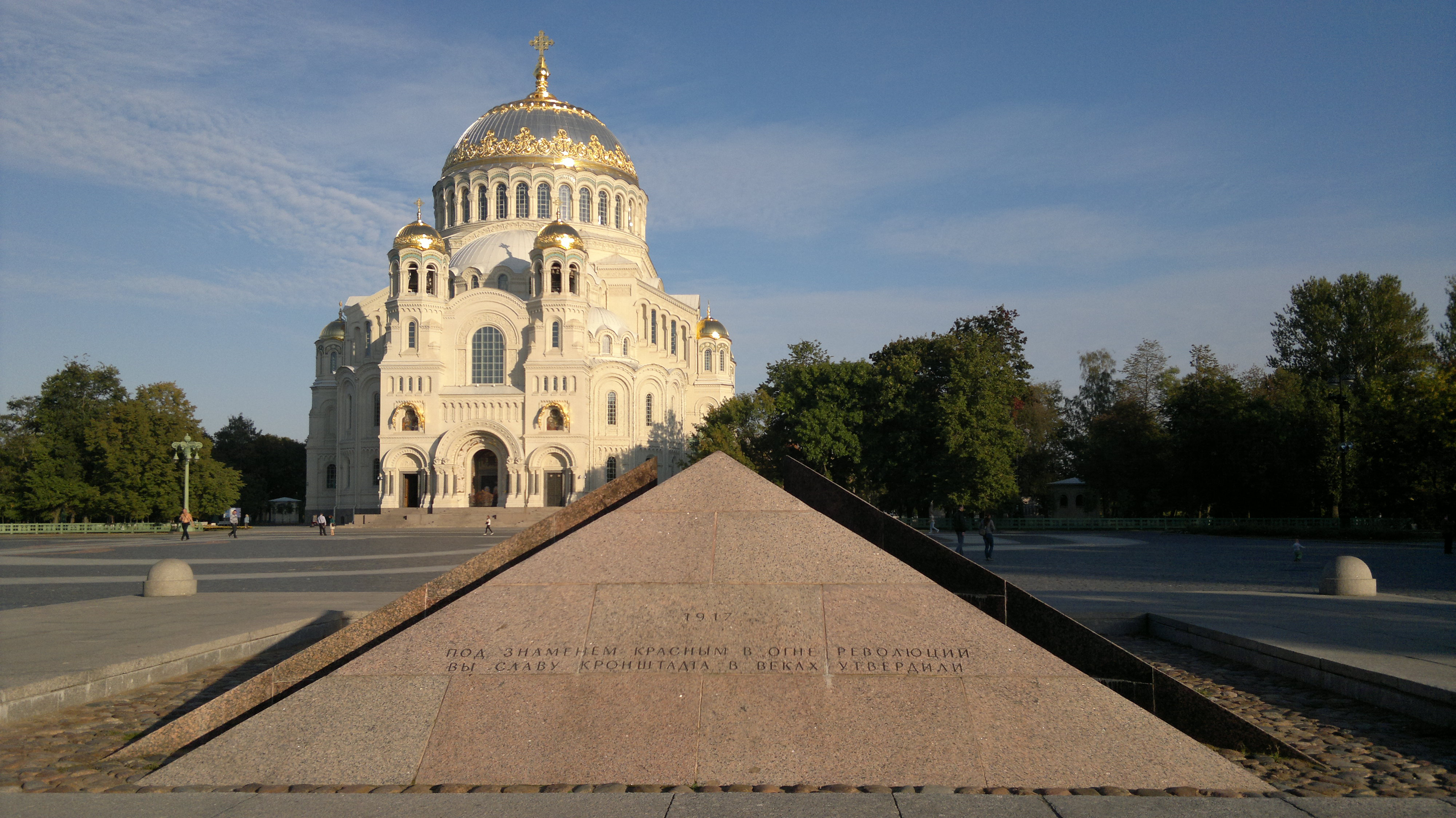
Monument to the Victims of Revolutions, containing an eternal flame, in Kronstadt's Anchor Square, with the Naval Cathedral in the background

The Kronstadt rebellion was the last major Russian buntarstvo—the rural, traditional, spontaneous, preindustrial uprisings. It clarified an authoritarian streak in the Bolshevik approach in which emergency Civil War-era measures never expired. Though the rebellion did not appear decisive or influential at the time, it later symbolized a fork in Russian history and the point in which that turned away from libertarian socialism.

Desolate Russian expatriates in Western Europe blamed themselves for not participating sooner. Anarchists Emma Goldman and Sasha Berkman lost their remaining faith in the Bolshevik movement. As Petrograd celebrated the Paris Commune's 50th anniversary the next day, vilifying the French government's suppression of that rebellion, Goldman wrote that the Internationale's once-jubilance "sounded like a funeral dirge for humanity's flaming hope".

In his analysis of the rebellion, historian Paul Avrich wrote that the rebels had scant chance of success, even if the ice melted to their favor and aid had arrived. Kronstadt was unprepared, ill-timed, and outmatched against a government that had just won a civil war of greater magnitude. Petrichenko, chair of the Kronstadt Revolutionary Committee, shared this retrospective criticism. Assistance from the White Army's General Wrangel would have taken months to mobilize. Avrich summed up the whole context in the introduction of his book Kronstadt, 1921:

Soviet Russia in 1921 was not the Leviathan of recent decades. It was a young and insecure state, faced with a rebellious population at home and implacable enemies abroad who longed to see the Bolsheviks ousted from power. More important still, Kronstadt was in Russian territory; what confronted the Bolsheviks was a mutiny in their own navy at its most strategic outpost, guarding the western approaches to Petrograd. Kronstadt, they feared, might ignite the Russian mainland or become the springboard for another anti-Soviet invasion. There was mounting evidence that Russian emigres were trying to assist the insurrection and to turn it to their own advantage. Not that the activities of the Whites can excuse any atrocities which the Bolsheviks committed against the sailors. But they do make the government's sense of urgency to crush the revolt more understandable. In a few weeks the ice in the Finnish Gulf would melt, and supplies and reinforcements could then be shipped in from the West, converting the fortress into a base for a new intervention. Apart from the propaganda involved, Lenin and Trotsky appear to have been genuinely anxious over this possibility.

Soviet international diplomacy concurrent with the rebellion, such as the Anglo-Soviet Trade Agreement and Treaty of Riga negotiations, continued unabated. The greater threat to Bolsheviks was a wider revolt and the rebels' only potential for success, as went the unheeded advice of the rebels' military specialists, was in an immediate mainland offensive before the government could respond. In this way, the Kronstadt rebels repeated the same fatal hesitation of the Paris Commune rebels 50 years prior. Seventy years later, a 1994 Russian government report rehabilitated the memory of the rebels and denounced the Bolshevik suppression of the rebellion. Its commissioner, Aleksandr Yakovlev, wrote that Kronstadt showed Bolshevik terror as Lenin's legacy, beginning what Stalin would continue. As of 2008, their rehabilitation has not been updated in the Kronstadt Fortress Museum.

In popular American intellectual usage, the term "Kronstadt" became a stand-in for an event that triggered one's disenchantment with Soviet Communism, as in the phrase, "I had my Kronstadt when ...". For some intellectuals, this was the Kronstadt rebellion itself but for others it was the Holodomor, Moscow Trials, East German uprising, intervention in Hungary, Khrushchev's Secret Speech, the Prague Spring, or the dissolution of the Soviet Union. The Kronstadt events are idealized in early Soviet period historiography as an example of "legitimate" popular expression.

Trotsky defended the actions of the Red Army in his essay "Hue and Cry over Kronstadt". He argued that the attitudes and social composition of the Kronstadt sailors had changed during the Russian Civil War. Trotsky further argued that the isolated location of the naval fortress would have enabled financial funding to flow between Kronstadt and White army emigres. Separately, he would also argue that he and Lenin had intended to lift the ban on the opposition parties such as the Mensheviks and Socialist Revolutionaries as soon as the economic and social conditions of Soviet Russia had improved after the Civil War.

French historian Pierre Broue criticised the Western representation of Trotsky's role in the Kronstadt rebellion, which he argued had falsely presented Trotsky as the principal figure that led and was responsible for the repression. Broue also disputed the historical assessments by modern historians such as Dmitri Volkogonov in which he argued had falsely equated Stalinism and Trotskyism to present the notion of ideological continuity and reinforce the position of counter-communism. Rogovin has disputed the idealized representation of the Kronstadt armed rebels and noted the fact they had imprisoned 500 communists and had sentenced Nikolai Kuzmin, the commissar of the Baltic Fleet, to death before the intervention of the Red Army. Rogovin also stated that an agent from Entente had reached Russia with documented gold with instructions for him to travel to Krondstadt and perform underground work.

There are multiple films about the Kronstadt rebellion, including Maggots and Men (2009).

== See also ==
- Bibliography of the Russian Revolution and Civil War
- Outline of the Russian Revolution and Civil War
- Index of articles related to the Russian Revolution and Civil War
- The "Russian" Civil Wars, 1916–1926: Ten Years That Shook the World
- Russia in Flames: War, Revolution, Civil War, 1914–1921
- Russia in Revolution: An Empire in Crisis, 1890 to 1928
- Russia: Revolution and Civil War, 1917—1921
- The Russian Revolution: A New History
- Battleship Potemkin
- Makhnovshchina
- Hungarian Revolution of 1956
- Prague Spring
- Russian anarchism
- Soviet Republic of Naissaar
- Tambov Rebellion
- West Siberian rebellion
- Explosion in Leontievsky Lane
- Kontrrazvedka
- 26 Baku Commissars
- Allied intervention in the Russian Civil War (1918–20)

Naval mutinies:

- Chilean naval mutiny of 1931
- Invergordon Mutiny
- Kiel mutiny
- Mutiny in the Indies
- Revolt of the Lash
- Royal Indian Navy mutiny
- Spithead and Nore mutinies
